= Julians Zagorskis =

Latgalian ceramicist

- Born: Julians Zagorskis; April 1903; Eisāgi, Russian Empire
- Died: 1978 (aged 74–75); Eisāgi, Latvian SSR
- Known for: Ceramics
- Movement: Latgalian ceramics

Julians Zagorskis (April 1903 – 1978) was a Latvian and Latgalian ceramicist.

== Biography ==
Julians Zagorskis was born in Eisāgi village in the modern-day Rušona Parish, Russian Empire in 1903. He was born in a ceramicists family, his brother Augusts was also a well-known Latgalian ceramicist. He started to work as a ceramicist in 1918.

Zagorskis, alongside Andrejs Paulāns, Polikarps Vilcāns and others, was one of the Latgalian ceramicists that was represented in 1957 Silajāņi ceramics exhibition in Rīga, organized by Jānis Pujāts. In later years, his works were selected for the exhibitions in Latvian SSR and abroad, in Moscow, Soviet Union.

Zagorskis died in 1978. He is buried in the Eisāgi cemetery.

His works are in the collections of Rainis Museum in Jasmuiža Manor and Latgale Culture and History Museum.
