= Augusts Zagorskis =

Latgalian ceramicist

- Born: Augusts Zagorskis; January 1900; Eisāgi, Russian Empire
- Died: 1963 (aged 62–63); Eisāgi, Latvian SSR
- Known for: Ceramics
- Movement: Latgalian ceramics

Augusts Zagorskis (1900 – 1963) was a Latvian and Latgalian ceramicist.

== Biography ==
Augusts Zagorskis was born at Eisāgi village in the modern-day Rušona Parish, Russian Empire in 1900. His brother Julians was also a well-known Latgalian ceramicist. His son Vaclavs continued the family tradition.

Zagorskis, alongside Andrejs Paulāns, Polikarps Vilcāns and others, was one of the Latgalian ceramicists that was represented in 1957 Silajāņi ceramics exhibition in Rīga, organized by Jānis Pujāts. In later years, his works were selected for the exhibitions in Latvian SSR and abroad, in Moscow, Soviet Union and Poland.

Zagorskis died in 1963. He is buried in the Eisāgi cemetery.

His works are in the collections of Rainis Museum in Jasmuiža Manor and Latgale Culture and History Museum.
