= Rēzekne =

State city in Latgale, Latvia, capital of Rēzekne Municipality

- State city
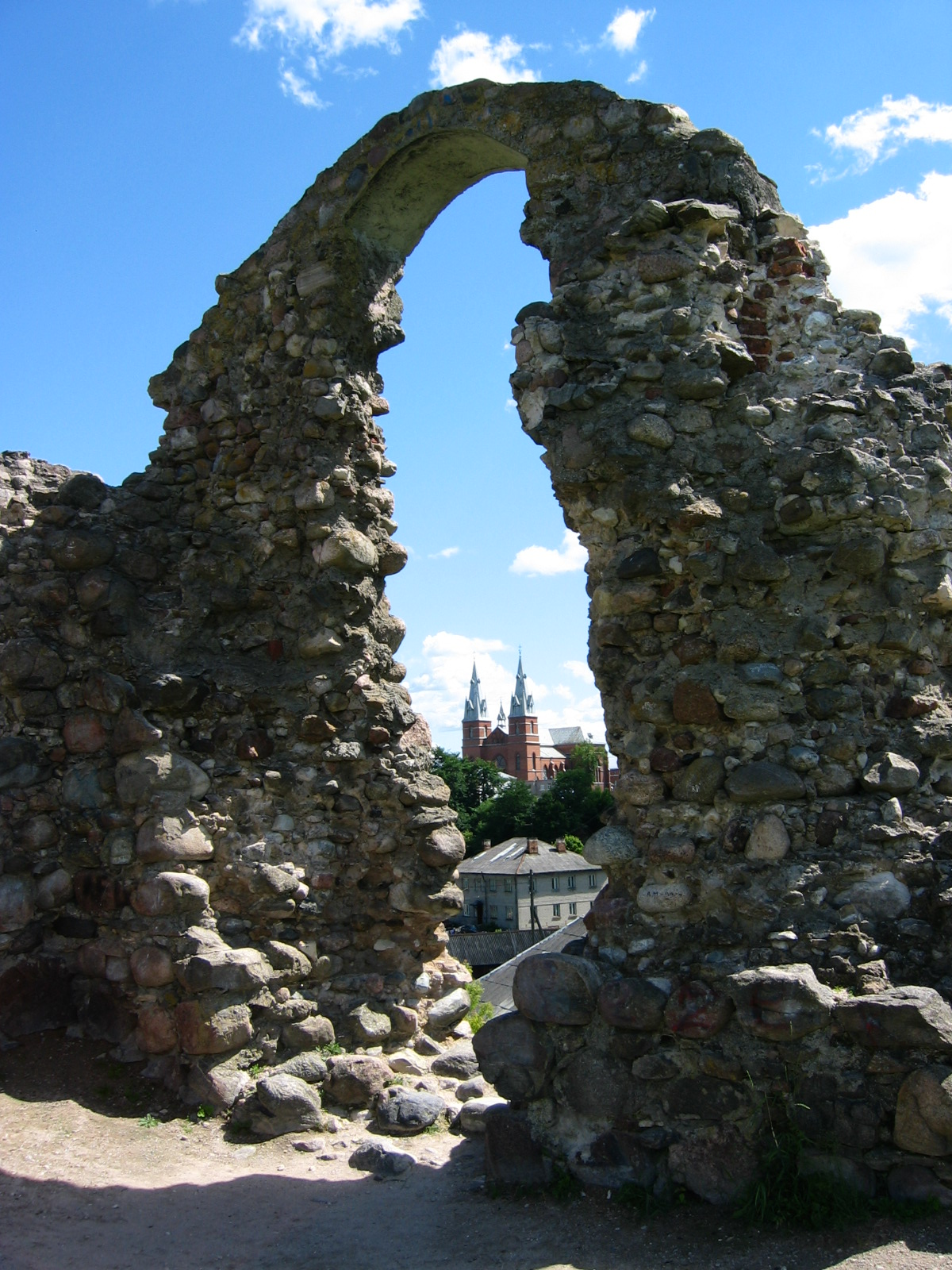
- The Rēzekne castle mound with Livonian Order castle ruins

- Flag Coat of arms Brandmark

- Location in Latvia
- Coordinates: 56°30′23″N 27°19′50″E
- Country: Latvia
- First mentioned: 1285
- Town rights: 1773

Government
  - Mayor: Jānis Tutins

Area
  - Total: 17.51 km^{2} (6.76 sq mi)
  - Land: 17.04 km^{2} (6.58 sq mi)
  - Water: 0.47 km^{2} (0.18 sq mi)
- Elevation: 158.2 m (519 ft)

Population (2026)
  - Total: 25,978
  - Density: 1,525/km^{2} (3,949/sq mi)

GDP
  - State city: 360,693,000 euro (2021)
  - Per capita: 13,540 euro (2021)
- Time zone: UTC+2 (EET)
  - Summer (DST): UTC+3 (EEST)
- Postal codes: LV-4601; LV-4604; LV-4605; LV-4606
- Calling code: +371 646
- Number of city council members: 13
- Website: www.rezekne.lv

Rēzekne (Latvian: [ˈrɛːzekne], Latgalian: Rēzne pronounced [rʲæːzʲnʲæ] or Rēzekne pronounced [ˈrʲæːzʲækʲnʲæ], Russian: Резекне) is a state city in the Rēzekne River valley in the Latgale region of eastern Latvia. It is called The Heart of Latgale (Latvian: Latgales sirds, Latgalian: Latgolys sirds). Built on seven hills, Rēzekne is situated 242 kilometres (150 miles) east of Riga, and 63 kilometres (39 miles) west of the Latvian-Russian border, at the intersection of the Moscow – Ventspils railway and Warsaw – Saint Petersburg Railways. It is the 7th largest city in Latvia. Rēzekne also serves as the location of the extraterritorial administrative centre of Rēzekne Municipality.

== Other names ==
The Latgalian name of the city is Rēzne (Latgalian: [rʲæːzʲnʲæ]) or Rēzekne (pronounced [ˈrʲæːzʲækʲnʲæ]). Historically, in German sources, the location has been known as Rositten. It is called Rzeżyca in Polish. Under the Russian Empire the city was named Rezhitsa (Russian: Рѣжица; Yiddish: רעזשיצע, romanized: Rezhitse), but since Soviet period known as Резекне (Russian pronunciation: [ˈrʲɛzɛknɛ]).

== History ==
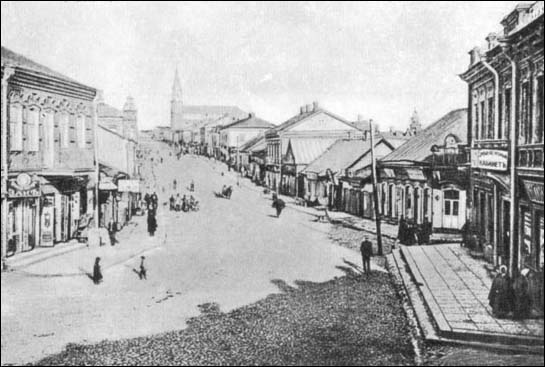
Rēzekne in early 20th century

A Latgalian hill fort is known to have existed at Rēzekne from the 9th to the 13th centuries, until its destruction at the hands of German crusaders of the Livonian Order. In 1285, the knights built a stone fortress on the site, which is today known as Rēzekne castle ruins, to serve as a border post on their eastern frontier.

The name Rēzekne was first documented in 1285. Throughout its early history, Rēzekne was attacked many times by Russian and Lithuanian forces.

In 1559, the town passed to the Polish–Lithuanian Commonwealth. During the Livonian War, it was occupied by Russians in 1567 and 1577. The town was restored to Poland after the Peace of Jam Zapolski in 1582. Rēzekne received Magdeburg rights from Poland in the 17th century. It was captured and occupied by Sweden during the Swedish invasion of 1655–1660. The Swedes demolished the castle's ramparts and the castle fell into ruins over time.

The town was annexed by the Russian Empire during the First Partition of Poland in 1772. In 1773, Rēzekne received city rights. Known as "Rezhitsa" during Russian rule, it was an uyezd center first in Pskov Governorate between 1772 and 1776, then Polotsk between 1776 and 1796, Belarus between 1796 and 1802 and finally in Vitebsk Governorate between 1802 and 1917.

During the 19th century, the construction of the Moscow-Ventspils and Saint Petersburg-Warsaw railways transformed Rēzekne from a sleepy country town into an important city with two stations.

In the spring of 1917, the first Latgalian congress was held in Rēzekne, in which Latgale was declared to unite with the other Latvian regions. Following Latvia's declaration of independence in 1918, the Latvian War of Independence and the driving out of both the German and Red armies from Latvia, the city became a cultural centre for all of Latgale.

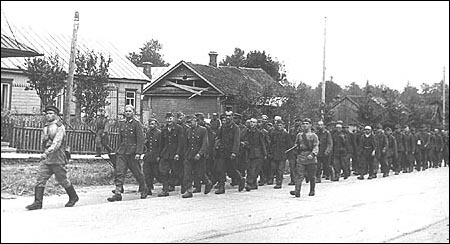
German POW march through Rēzekne 1940s

Rēzekne was heavily damaged by both Nazi and Soviet armies during World War II. It was captured by troops of the German Army Group North on 4 July 1941 and placed under the administration of the newly created Reichskommissariat Ostland on 25 July 1941. The Germans operated a subcamp of the Stalag 340 prisoner-of-war camp in the city. Rēzekne was recaptured by troops of the Soviet 2nd Belorussian Front on 27 July 1944. Due to the heavy air-bombing by Soviet forces in 1944, two-thirds of its buildings were destroyed. Out of a pre-war population of 13,300, only 5,000 people remained in the city at the end of the war.

Rēzekne was rebuilt after the war with an emphasis on industrial development. Rēzekne had the 5th highest industrial output in the Latvian SSR, including a dairy processor (Rēzeknes Piena konservu kombināts), a lumber mill, and an electric-instrument factory (Rebir).

== Demographics ==
Based on the data provided by Latvijas Statistika, the population of Rēzekne was 10,795 in the year 1897. It decreased to 9,997 in 1920, while increasing again to 12,620 in 1925 and 13,139 in 1935.

Residents of Rēzekne by ethnicity (2022)
Latvians	47.5%
Russians	41.6%
Poles	2.1%
Belarusians	1.5%
Ukrainians	1.4%
Others	5.8%

As a result of the Pale of Settlement, many Jews settled in Latgalia and were confined to the cities. In the 19th century, the population of Rēzekne was around 60% Jewish, while Russians formed the largest minority (about 24% in 1897). The remainder of the population included Poles, Germans, and a small number of native Latgalians. With the economic development following the arrival of the railroad, the population grew steadily, reaching 23,000 by the eve of World War I.

After Latvia's independence in 1918, the population of ethnic Latvians in the city grew substantially, but Jews still made up slightly over a quarter of the population (25.4% in 1935.) In 1939, the population was 13,000. During World War II, the Jewish population was annihilated, most between July and October 1941, due to the Holocaust. Most other residents were either deported to Gulag camps in Siberia, or fled westwards. As a result, the post-war population was only 5,000.

As part of the Soviet Union's policy of Russification, many Russians and Belarusians moved to the city after the Soviet occupation of Latvia at the end of World War II. By 1989, Russians accounted for the majority of the population, at 53%. After Latvia's independence in 1991, many repatriated to Russia.

In 1991, the population of Rēzekne was 43,156. Since then, the population has decreased to 30,800 (2017), due to a low birth rate, an aging population (the average age in Rēzekne is 40.3 years) (see also ageing of Europe), and a high rate of emigration abroad and to larger cities such as Riga.

== Religion ==
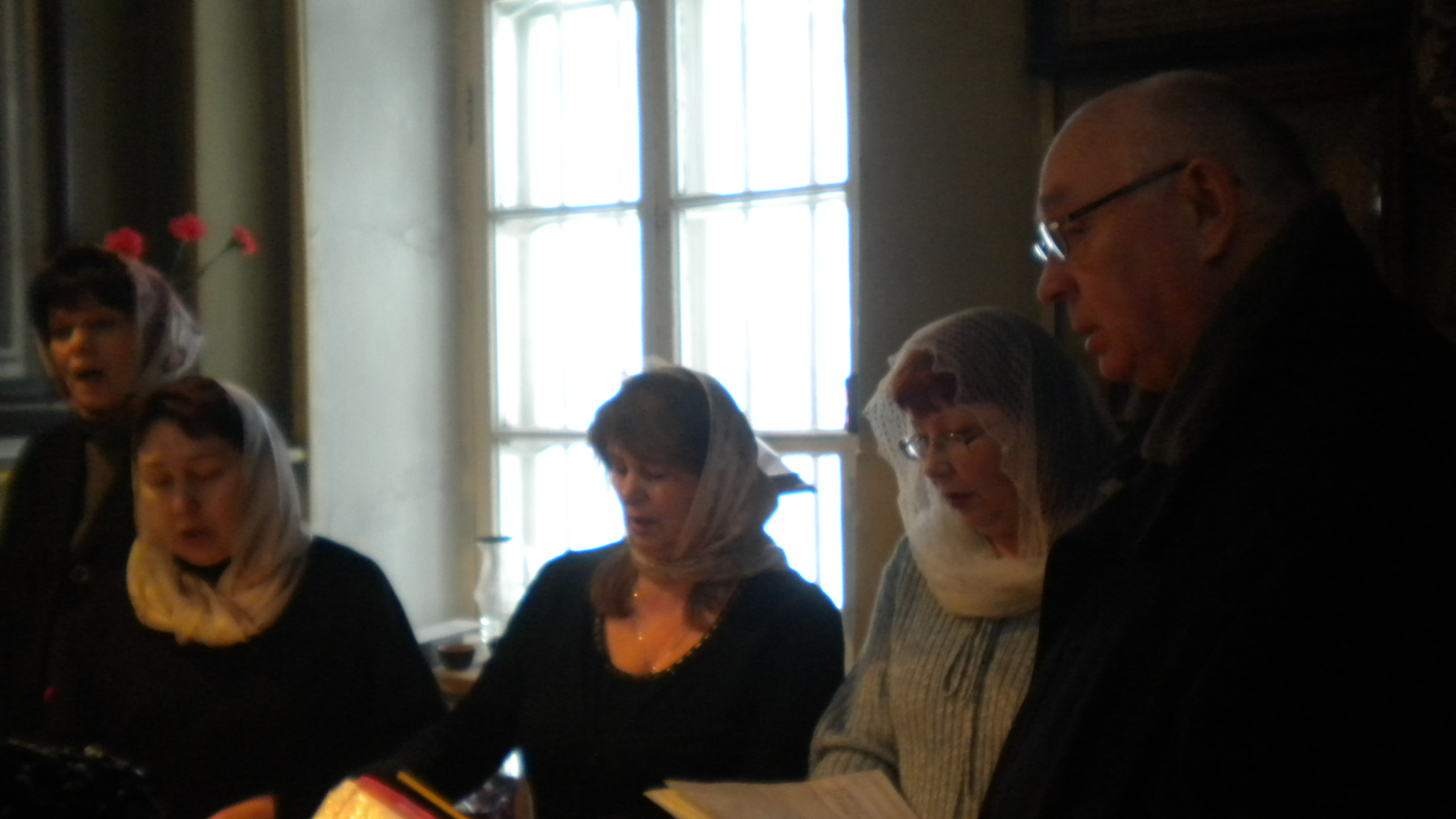
Sunday choir of Orthodox church

Due to Rēzekne's multi-ethnic character throughout the centuries, many religious communities have settled in the city. Ethnic differences were often distinguished on religious lines; the Germans brought Christianity to Latvia in the 13th century, as well as Lutheranism during the Reformation. The Polish influence over Latgalia in the 17th and 18th centuries strengthened Catholicism among the native Latgalians. Incoming populations of Russian Old Believers introduced Russian Orthodoxy, and up to the 1940s, Rēzekne had a very large Jewish population, and therefore, many synagogues.

=== Sacred Heart Cathedral ===
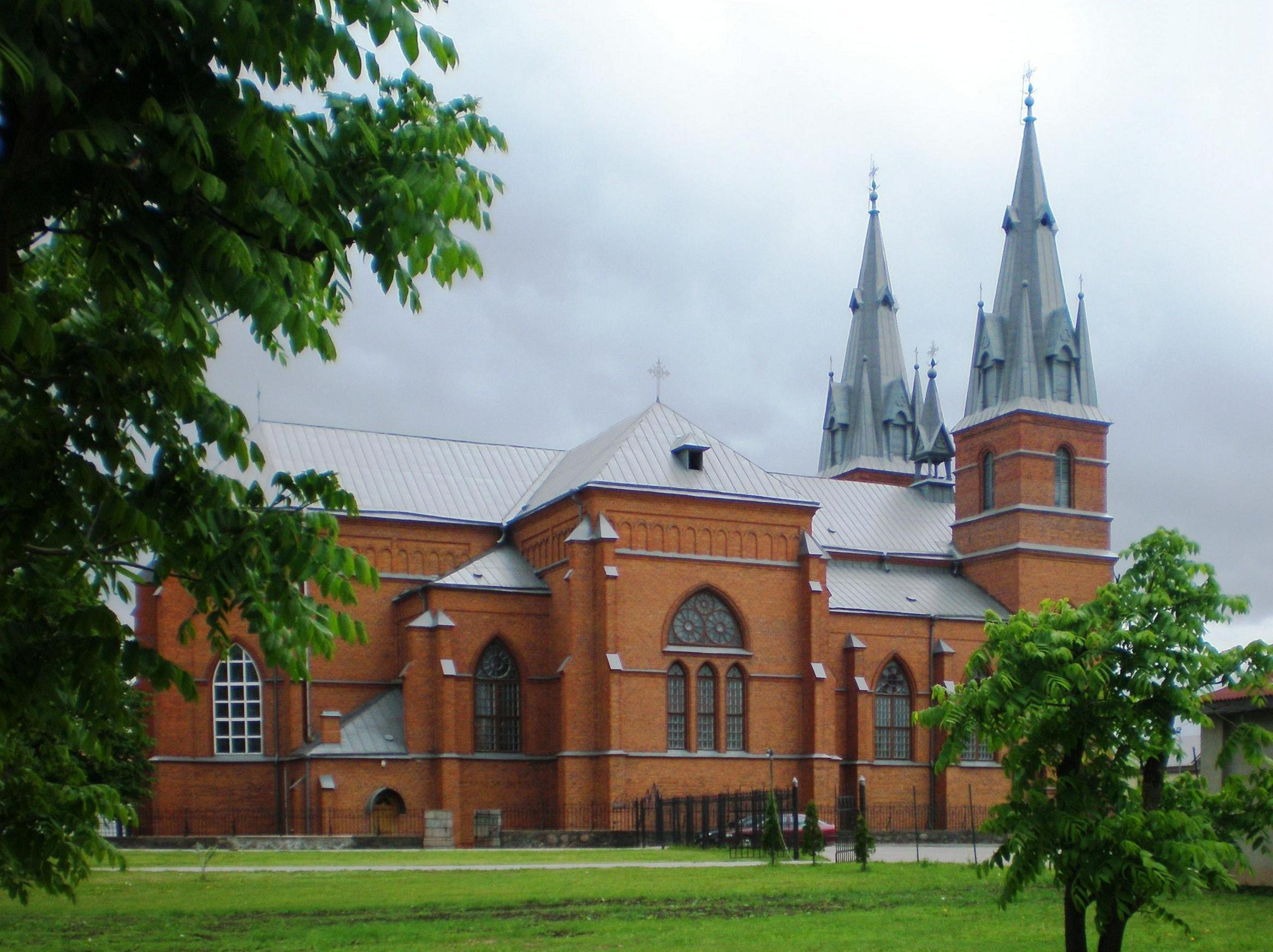
Sacred Heart of Jesus Cathedral

The Catholic Cathedral "Vissvētā Jēzus Sirds" (Sacred Heart of Jesus), (built 1893–1914) dominates Rēzekne's skyline looking from the castle hill.

The cathedral was consecrated in 1901. It was built on the site of a previous wooden church which had been constructed from the funds allotted by Kraków military leader Belinski. In 1887 the church was destroyed in a thunderstorm-caused fire.

The cathedral has curved wooden altars decorated by the sculptures of Jesus Christ, Virgin Mary, St.Teresa, and others. The cathedral is famous for its depictions in stained glass of the first Livonian bishops, Saint Meinhard and Albert of Riga. Since 1995 it has been the centre of the Rezekne-Aglona diocese with the seat of the bishop.

The church has an active choir whose members have studied music. A majority of the members work as musicians and enjoy their Sunday singing in the church.

=== Our Lady of Sorrows Roman Catholic Church ===
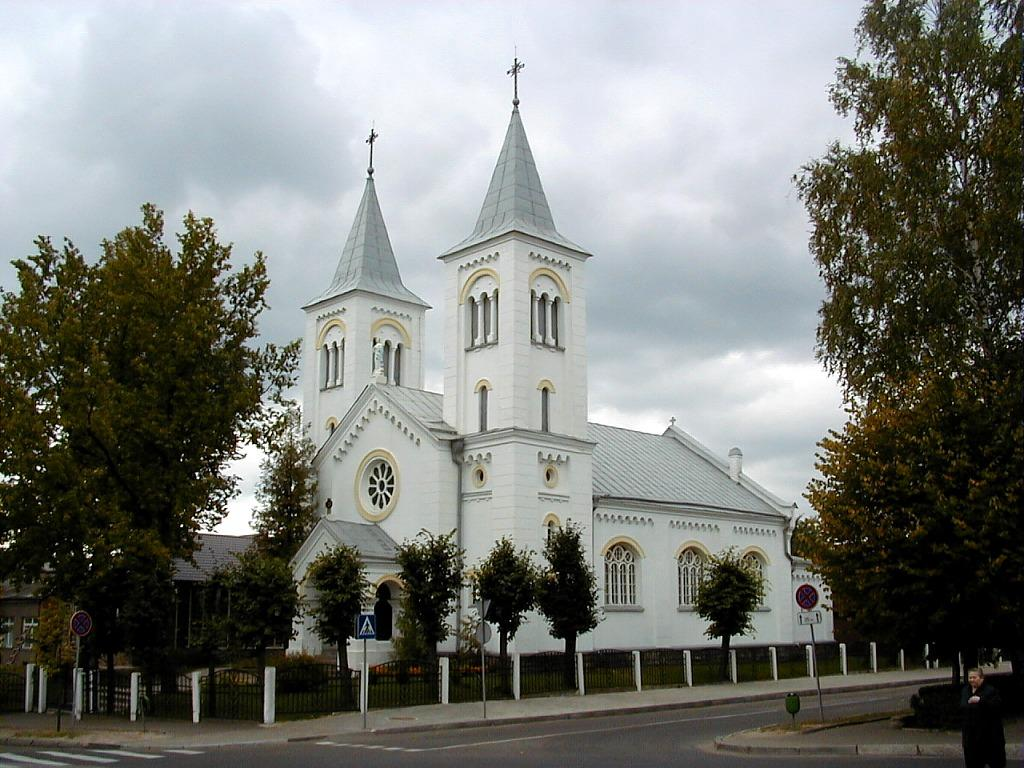
Our Lady of Sorrows Roman Catholic Church

The other Catholic church, "Sāpju Dievmāte" (Our Lady of Sorrows) is much newer, built from 1935 to 1939.

Construction began in 1936. The 27 metres (89 feet) tall building was built in neo-romantic style. The church was consecrated on 6 December 1937, but the construction was finished only in 1939. Next to the church is a sculpture of Our Lady of Fátima.

Like many 1930s buildings in the city such as the Nation Palace of Latvian Society (the House of Culture nowadays), the Secondary School no.3 elementary school, and the Red Cross Hospital (nowadays a students hostel) it was designed by the architect Pavlov.

=== Orthodox Church of the Birth of Holy Jesus' Mother ===
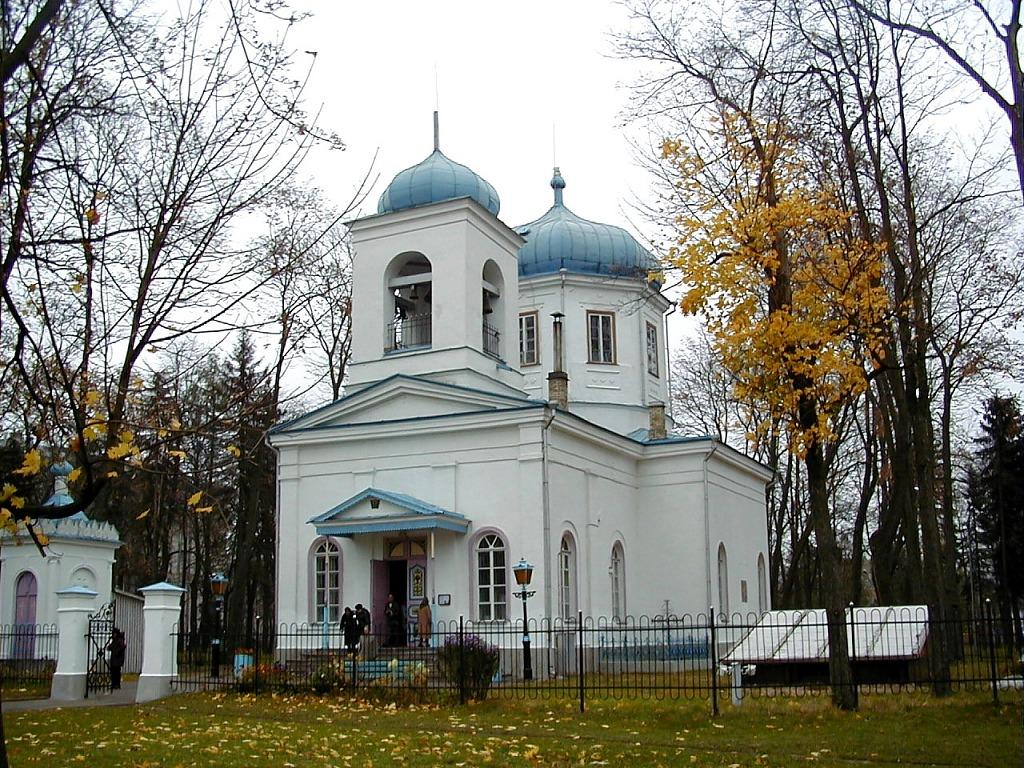
Orthodox Church of the Birth of Holy Jesus' Mother

The construction of the church dates back to 1840, though it was not consecrated until 1846. In 1854, it was closed for reconstruction. After a two-year reconstruction period the church obtained its definitive look.

Tile stoves, tiled floors, three-storey iconostasis and a granite stoop decorated the church. A small stone chapel in memory of Alexander II's rescue from death is situated on the left side of the church entrance. On the right there is a glass burial vault where the founder of the church, the owner of the Adamova manor general Karaulov and his wife Helen were buried.

=== Evangelical Lutheran Holy Trinity Church ===
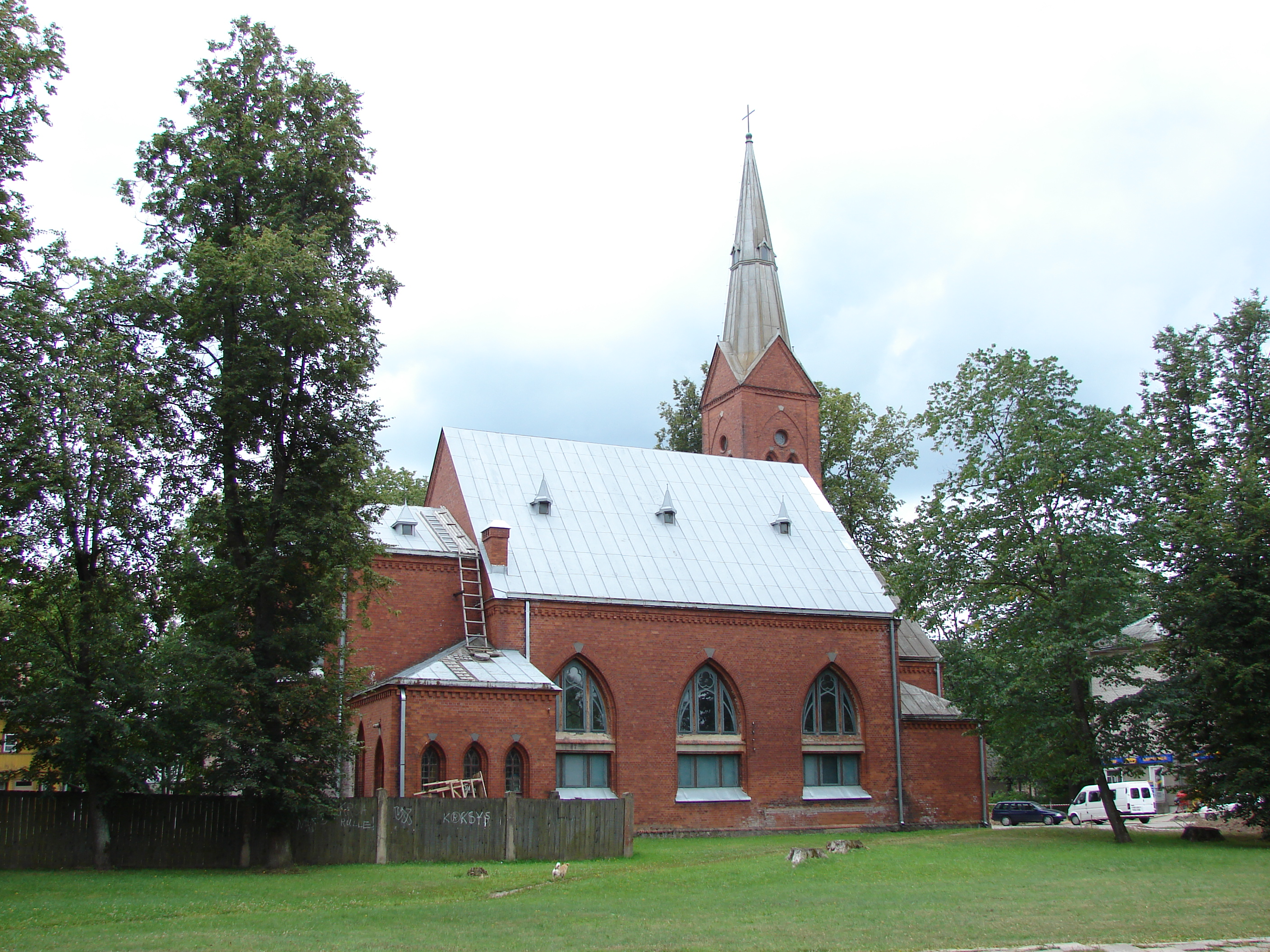
Evangelical Lutheran Holy Trinity Church

The red brick church from was built in the 1930s. The church was designed by the architect J. Cīrulis in Neo-Gothic style. The church was consecrated in 1938. In the summer of 1949 the Soviet authority deprived the parishioners of their church, removed its crosses and dismantled the belfry. For many years there was a film rental company.

The parish got back its property at the beginning of the 1990s and the building has undergone major repairs. It is possible to climb the 37 metres (121 feet) bell tower and see Rēzekne from above. Classical music concerts and divine services take place in the church nowadays.

=== St.Nicholas Old-Believers' Church ===
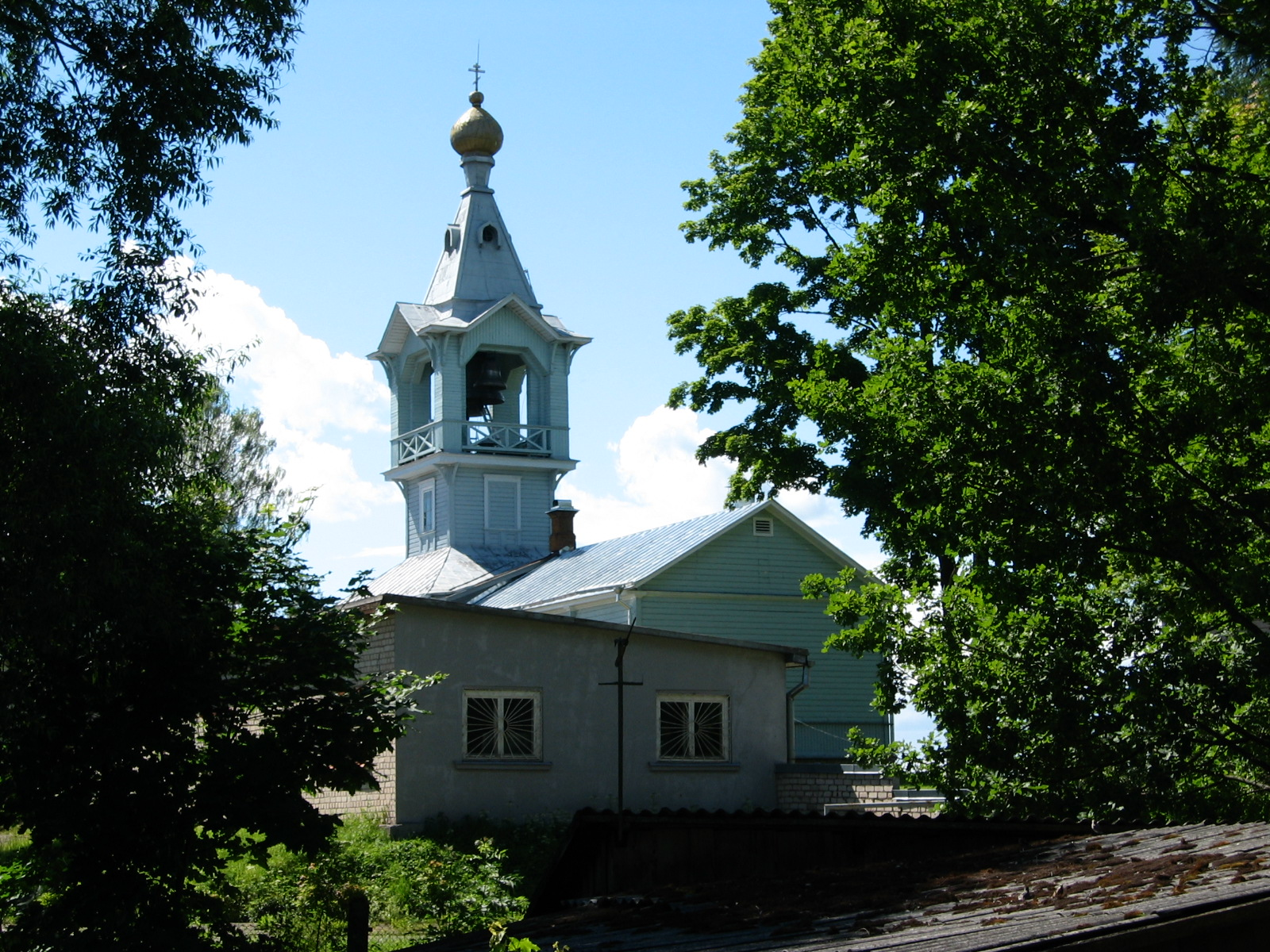
St.Nicholas Old-Believers' Church

The church was built in 1895. In 1906 it was considerably reconstructed, with a belfry with three bells, for which the church is now famous. One of them weighs 4,832 kg (10,653 lb) and is the biggest bell in Latvia. The bell clapper alone is 200 kg (441 lb) heavy.

A museum is now opened in the premises of Rēzekne Old-Believers Cemetery Commune which shows the daily routine and lifestyle of Latgalian old-believers. In one of the rooms the collected items reflect church life, another has ethnographical items. The museum can be visited on request.

=== Green Synagogue ===
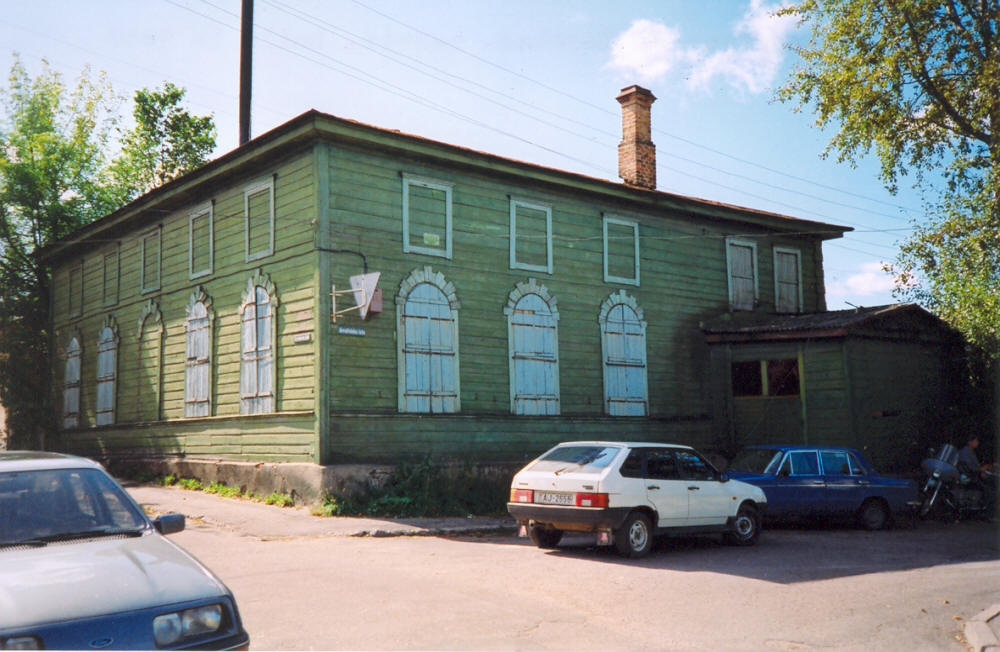
The Green Synagogue

Prior to World War II, there were eleven synagogues in Rēzekne. The Green Synagogue is the only one to have survived to this day.

The synagogue was built in 1845 and is considered to be one of the oldest wooden buildings in Rēzekne. The synagogue was open until the 1990s, when it was closed for fire safety reasons.

The State Inspection for Heritage Protection of Latvia added it to the list of the most endangered sites in 2004. The Rēzekne City Council with the support of Norwegian Financial Institutions started reconstruction of the building. Within the framework of the project it will be possible to create an exhibition devoted to the history of Rēzekne's Jews.

== Culture ==
=== Latgales Māra ===
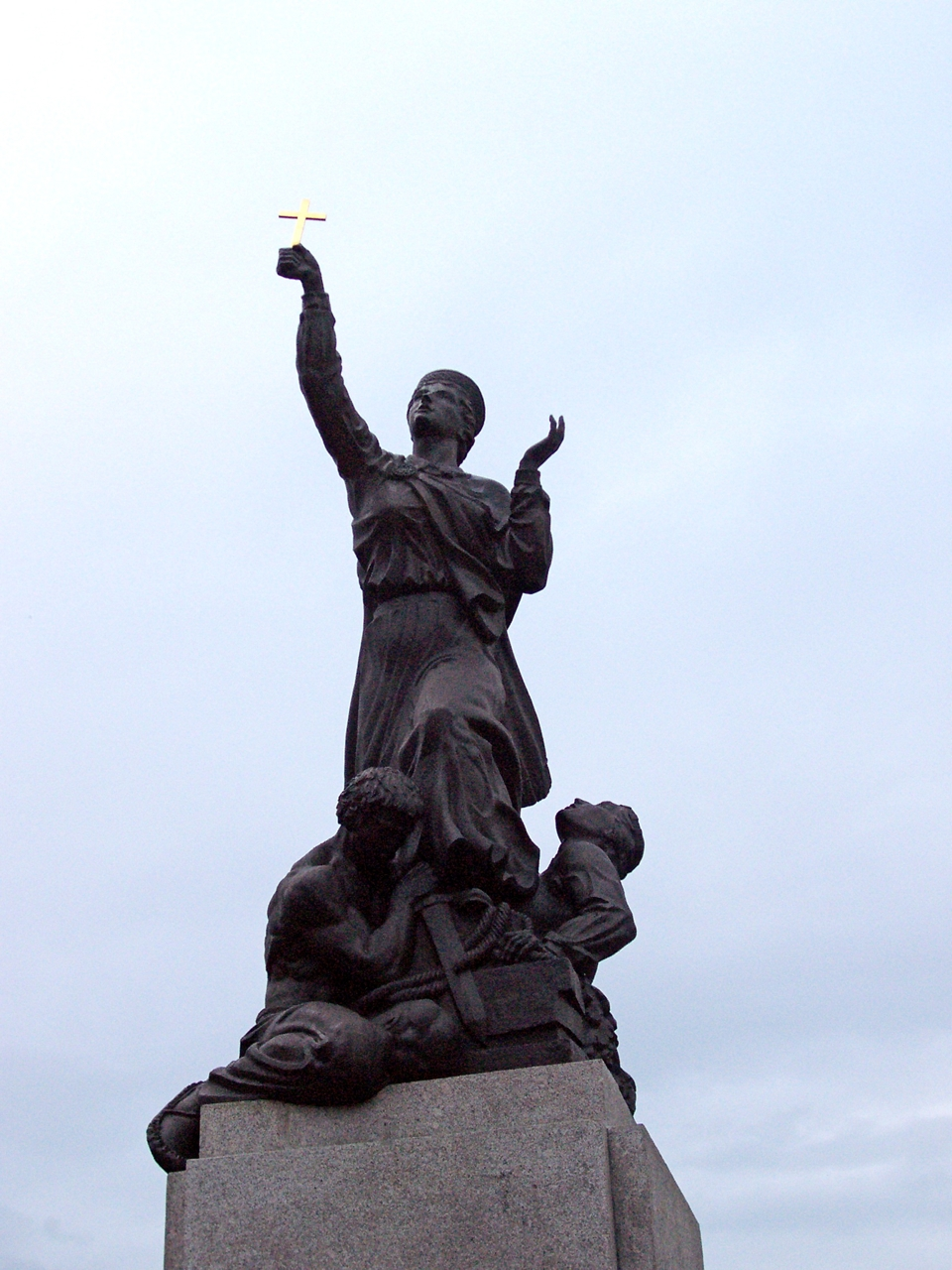
Latgales Māra

One of the most famous statues in Latvia, known as "Latgales Māra", is found in Rēzekne. It was designed by Leons Tomašickis and first unveiled on 8 September 1939. The bronze statue commemorates the liberation of Latgale from the Red Army in January 1920.

The central figure, the woman, is popularly associated with Māra, the ancient Latvian goddess of motherhood, fertility, and earth. The cross in her outstretched arm symbolizes the deep importance of Catholicism to Latgalian culture. The words "Vienoti Latvijai" beneath the statue (meaning "United for Latvia") designates the decision to reunite with the rest of Latvia during the Republic's formation in 1918, even though Latgale had been politically separated from the rest of Latvia for 300 years.

Because the statue symbolized Latvian nationalism, the Soviets toppled it in November 1940 during the first Soviet occupation of Latvia. Under German occupation the local residents restored it on 22 August 1943. The reinstated Soviet government pulled it down again in June 1950. After that, the fate of the original statue is unknown.

After Latvia regained its independence in 1991, the statue was reconstructed using old photographs and blueprints, and unveiled on 13 August 1992. Though Soviet rule greatly changed Latgale, Latgales Māra still symbolizes a Catholic Latgale united with Latvia, free of foreign domination.

=== Castle Ruins ===
The Castle Ruins, situated on the hill by the river, are the remainders of the ancient fortified residence of ancient Latgalians which existed there from the 9th to 13th centuries. At the end of the 13th century the Livonian Order built a stone castle (Rozitten castle). It was situated in a strategically important place, so the Russians, Lithuanians and Poles were seeking to conquer it. The castle was completely destroyed during the Polish-Swedish war (1656–1660). A model of Rēzekne castle by Edmunds Smans is located near the castle hill.

=== Latgale Culture and History Museum ===
The Latgale Culture and History Museum (Latgales Kultūrvēstures muzejs) was opened in 1959. The museum offers exposition of the town history, art exhibitions, and pedagogical activities for children. The exposition of Latgale ceramics is the only permanent exposition in Latvia to reflect Latgalian ceramics in its history from the beginning of pottery in the Neolithic period until the achievements of present-day Latgalian ceramists and modern developments. Ceramics collection includes 2000 ceramic wares, made by the renowned Latgalian ceramicists, such as Andrejs Paulāns, Polikarps Čerņavskis, Polikarps Vilcāns, Jānis Backāns, Ādams Kāpostiņš and others. At the moment the museum stock collection has about 70 thousand items.

=== Art House ===
The building which is now known as the Art House was built in the last quarter of the 19th century for the merchant Vorobjov. It features rich woodcarvings on its façade, decorated in an eclectic style.

It soon became the property of the city, and was used as a teachers' institute, a school, a tuberculosis centre and a military registration office. This frequent change of users almost totally destroyed the original rich interior.

In the middle of the 1990s it was acquired by the Rezekne Art College. Due to the efforts of the students and teachers, the Art House got back its original outlook. It houses the exposition "Latgalian painting" from the reserves of the Latgale Culture History Museum.

=== Eastern Latvia's Center of Creative Services "Zeimuļs" ===
The Eastern Latvia's Center of Creative Services "Zeimuļs" houses classes of interest and non-formal education for children and youth.

The opening of the center was on 1 September 2012. The architects were Rasa Kalniņa and Māris Krumiņš who used Latvian ethnographic motifs in their design. The main construction materials are concrete, glass, metal and wood. It is the largest building with a green roof in the Baltic countries. The towers offer one of the best views in Rezekne, over the Castle Hill and the historical center of the city.

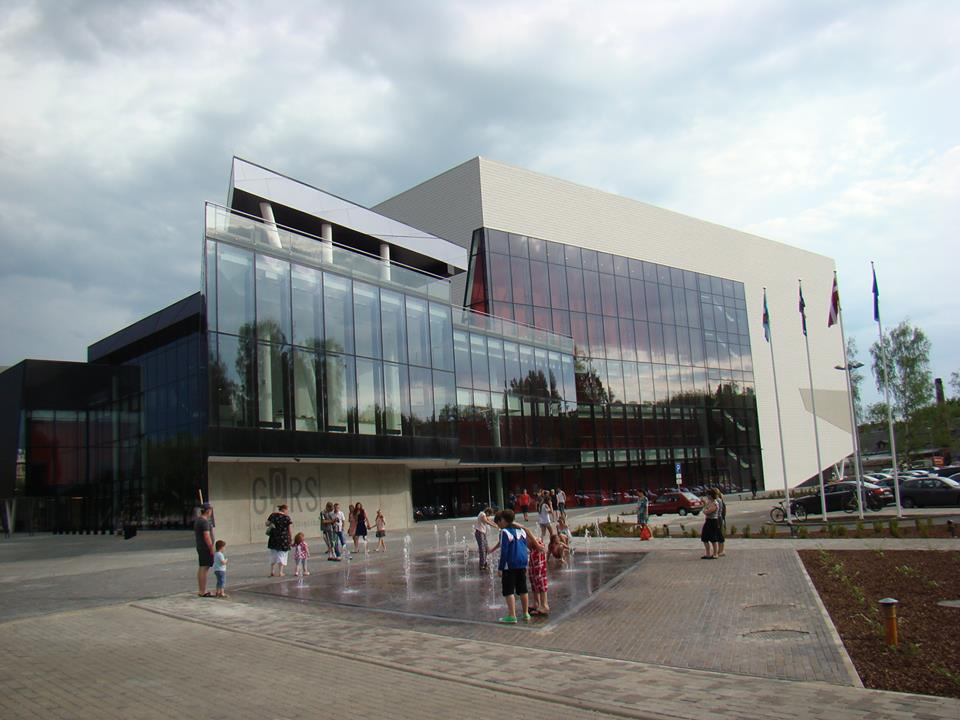
The centre of culture "Gors"

=== The centre of culture "Gors" ===
The multifunctional culture centre "Gors" (The Embassy of Latgale) was opened in 2013. In addition to the main 1000-seat concert hall, it includes a 220-seat concert hall, Registration of marriages hall, exhibition space, repetition halls and a restaurant. The centre is used for a variety of purposes, including concerts, conferences, film, ballet and theatre.

== Scientific centers ==
Rēzekne Academy of Technology is one of the higher education institutes and research centers of Latvia. It has three faculties, namely, faculty of education, languages, and design, faculty of engineering and faculty of economics and management. Rēzekne Academy of Technology offers study programs at the Bachelor's, Master's and Doctoral levels.

== Notable residents ==
- Stanisława Dowgiałłówna (1865–1933), she was a Polish pharmacist
- Eber Landau (1878–1959), a Baltic German Swiss anatomist, histologist, physician and professor
- Yury Tynyanov (1894–1943), Soviet/Russian writer and literary critic of Jewish origin
- Fridrikh Ermler (1898–1967), Soviet film director, actor and screenwriter.
- Tadeusz Manteuffel (1902–1970), a Baltic German Polish historian, specialized in medieval history of Europe.
- Leon Manteuffel-Szoege (1904–1973), Polish surgeon
- Edward Manteuffel-Szoege (1908–1940), a Polish artist, competed in the art competitions at the 1936 Summer Olympics
- Teuvo Tulio (1912–2000), Finnish film director and actor
- Jānis Urbanovičs (born 1959), politician and author; a member of the Saeima since 1994.
- Ilze Viņķele (born 1971), politician, Minister for Health of Latvia, 2019 – 2021
- Iveta Apkalna (born 1976), world-famous Latvian organist and pianist.
- Kristine Opolais (born 1979), operatic soprano.

=== Sport ===
- Valentīna Eiduka (1937–2023), javelin thrower and coach
- Ilmārs Starostīts (born 1979), chess player, holds the FIDE title of Grandmaster, 2010
- Vadims Logins (born 1981), footballer, who played about 375 games
- Kaspars Cipruss (born 1982), basketball player, General Secretary of the Latvian Basketball Association.
- Guntars Silagailis (born 1984), football coach, played over 400 games
- Vladislavs Kozlovs (born 1987), footballer, played over 300 games
- Edgars Gauračs (born 1988), footballer, played 257 games and 22 for Latvia
- Aiga Grabuste (born 1988), heptathlete and track and field athlete. participated in the 2008 & 2012 Summer Olympics
- Žanna Juškāne (born 1989), biathlete, she competed in the 2010 Winter Olympics
- Žanis Peiners (born 1990), basketball player
- Gunta Vaičule (born 1995), 400 metres sprinter, participated at the 2024 Summer Olympics

== Climate ==
Rēzekne has a humid continental climate (Köppen Dfb).

Climate data for Rēzekne, Latvia (1991-2020 normals, extremes 1956–present)
Month	Jan	Feb	Mar	Apr	May	Jun	Jul	Aug	Sep	Oct	Nov	Dec	Year
Record high °C (°F)	10.3 (50.5)	10.5 (50.9)	17.2 (63.0)	27.2 (81.0)	30.0 (86.0)	32.1 (89.8)	34.1 (93.4)	34.7 (94.5)	30.1 (86.2)	22.6 (72.7)	15.2 (59.4)	10.5 (50.9)	34.7 (94.5)
Mean daily maximum °C (°F)	−2.4 (27.7)	−1.9 (28.6)	3.2 (37.8)	11.5 (52.7)	17.5 (63.5)	20.8 (69.4)	23.2 (73.8)	22.1 (71.8)	16.4 (61.5)	9.2 (48.6)	2.9 (37.2)	−0.8 (30.6)	10.1 (50.3)
Daily mean °C (°F)	−4.6 (23.7)	−4.6 (23.7)	−0.4 (31.3)	6.4 (43.5)	12.0 (53.6)	15.5 (59.9)	17.8 (64.0)	16.5 (61.7)	11.5 (52.7)	5.8 (42.4)	0.8 (33.4)	−2.7 (27.1)	6.2 (43.1)
Mean daily minimum °C (°F)	−7.2 (19.0)	−7.8 (18.0)	−4.2 (24.4)	1.4 (34.5)	6.0 (42.8)	9.9 (49.8)	12.4 (54.3)	11.2 (52.2)	7.2 (45.0)	2.6 (36.7)	−1.4 (29.5)	−4.9 (23.2)	2.1 (35.8)
Record low °C (°F)	−38.6 (−37.5)	−38.8 (−37.8)	−29.0 (−20.2)	−18.4 (−1.1)	−5.1 (22.8)	−0.8 (30.6)	2.0 (35.6)	−0.4 (31.3)	−5.0 (23.0)	−12.5 (9.5)	−24.2 (−11.6)	−38.5 (−37.3)	−38.8 (−37.8)
Average precipitation mm (inches)	43.5 (1.71)	35.8 (1.41)	32.7 (1.29)	33.4 (1.31)	60.5 (2.38)	81.1 (3.19)	66.5 (2.62)	74.9 (2.95)	55.4 (2.18)	64.5 (2.54)	49.8 (1.96)	41.6 (1.64)	639.7 (25.18)
Average precipitation days (≥ 1 mm)	11	9	9	7	10	11	10	10	9	12	11	11	120
Average relative humidity (%)	88.1	85.4	76.4	67.0	67.6	72.7	75.3	78.1	82.5	85.7	89.7	90.1	79.9
Source 1: LVĢMC
Source 2: NOAA (precipitation days, humidity 1991-2020)

== Twin towns – sister cities ==
Rēzekne is twinned with:

- Arendal, Norway
- Braslaw, Belarus
- Częstochowa, Poland
- Krychaw, Belarus
- Sianów, Poland
- Soroca, Moldova
- Utena, Lithuania
- Vitebsk, Belarus
