= Latgale Culture and History Museum =

Museum in Latvia

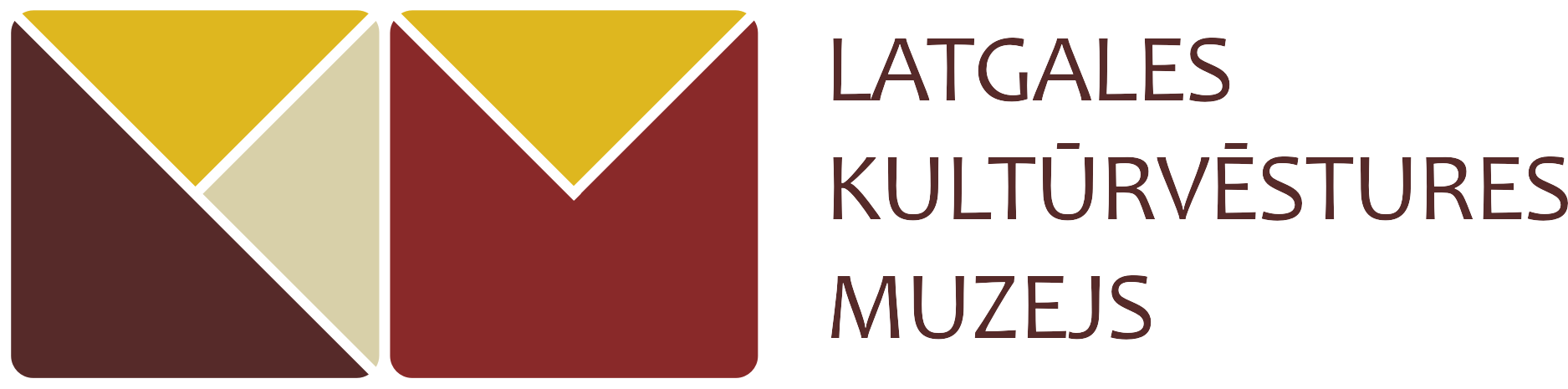
- The museum's logo
- Established: 1959
- Location: Atbrīvošanas aleja 102; LV-4601 Rēzekne; Latvia
- Coordinates: 56°30′27″N 27°19′55″E
- Type: History museum
- Collection size: 70,000
- Visitors: 31,244 (2018)
- Website: Latgales Kultūrvēstures Muzejs

The Latgale Culture and History Museum (Latvian: Latgales Kultūrvēstures Muzejs) in Rēzekne, Latvia, is a history museum with a large collection of items, including Latgalian ceramics. It receives about 31,000 visitors per year.

== History ==
Latgale Culture and History Museum was founded in 1959 as a branch of Ludza Local History Museum. In 1960, it was renamed to Rēzekne Local History Museum, but the current name to museum was given in 1990. It was created with the aim of showcasing and promoting the Latgalian history, art and culture.

== Collection ==
Museum has a collection of Latgalian ceramics. This collection includes 2000 ceramic wares, made by the Latgalian ceramicists, such as Andrejs Paulāns, Polikarps Čerņavskis, Polikarps Vilcāns, Jānis Backāns, Ādams Kāpostiņš and others. This is the biggest collection of Latgalian ceramics in the world. In 2014, 500 of those ceramic wares were part of the museum's exhibition The wonder created by clay and fire transformations.

There are 28,000 pieces of Latgalian literature available in the collection of museum.
