= Eisāgi =

Village in Latvia

- Village
- Location in Latvia
- Coordinates: 56°16′N 26°53′E
- Country: Latvia
- Municipality: Preiļi Municipality
- Elevation: 173.3 m (569 ft)

Population (2020)
  - Total: 5
- Time zone: UTC+2 (EET)
  - Summer (DST): UTC+3 (EEST)
- Postal code: LV-5329

Eisāgi is a village in the Rušona Parish of Preiļi Municipality in the Latgale region of Latvia. It is a home of the famous Latgalian ceramicists, such as Augusts Zagorskis. It is located 213 kilometers from the capital city of Latvia, Riga. It has a population of 5 (2020).

== History ==
Towards the end of 19th century, pottery craft was common in Eisāgi village. Renowned Latgalian ceramicists, the Zagorski family members: Augusts Zagorskis, Julians Zagorskis and Vaclavs Zagorskis were born in Eisāgi.

== Geography ==
Eisāgi is located close to the Salmejs lake nearby neighboring Gaiļmuiža. Village is 173 meters above the sea level and it is located in the western part of the Latgale Upland.
