= Jānis Backāns =

Latvian ceramicist

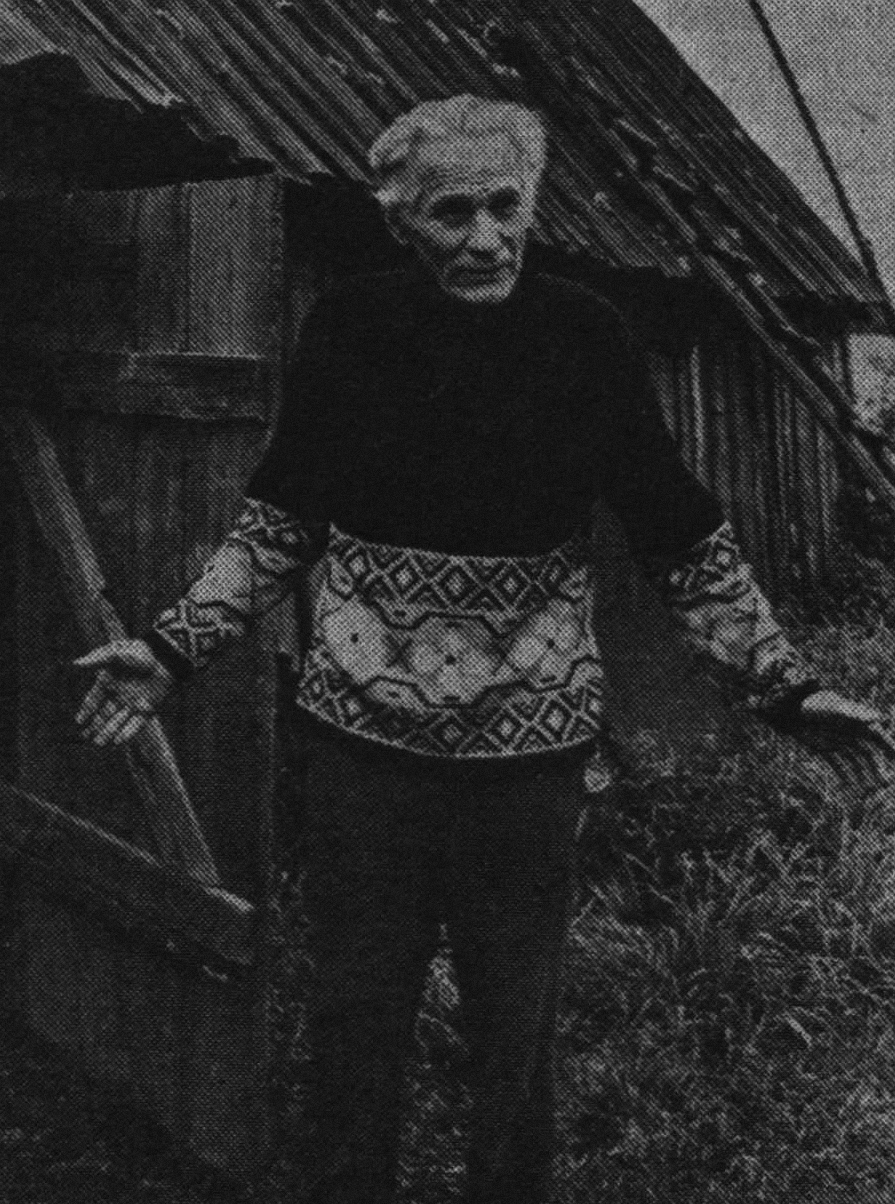
- Backāns in 1985
- Born: Jānis Backāns; 23 June 1925; Feimaņi Parish, Latvia
- Died: 2004 (aged 78–79); Latvia
- Known for: Ceramics
- Movement: Latgalian ceramics

Jānis Backāns (23 June 1925 – 2004) was a Latvian and Latgalian ceramicist.

== Biography ==
Jānis Backāns was born at Ezergailīši village in Feimaņi Parish, Latvia in 1925. His grandfather Jāzeps taught him the ceramicist craft in his early days and later he was a pupil in the workshop of the famous Latgalian ceramicist Andrejs Paulāns.

In 1942, Backāns became a ceramicist. From 1942 to 1962, he worked in Krustpils production plant. Since 1957, his works were exhibited in exhibitions. His works were selected for several exhibitions in Latgale and outside the Latvian SSR, in France, Hungary, Romania, Bulgaria and Czechoslovakia.
