= Ādams Kāpostiņš =

Latvian ceramicist

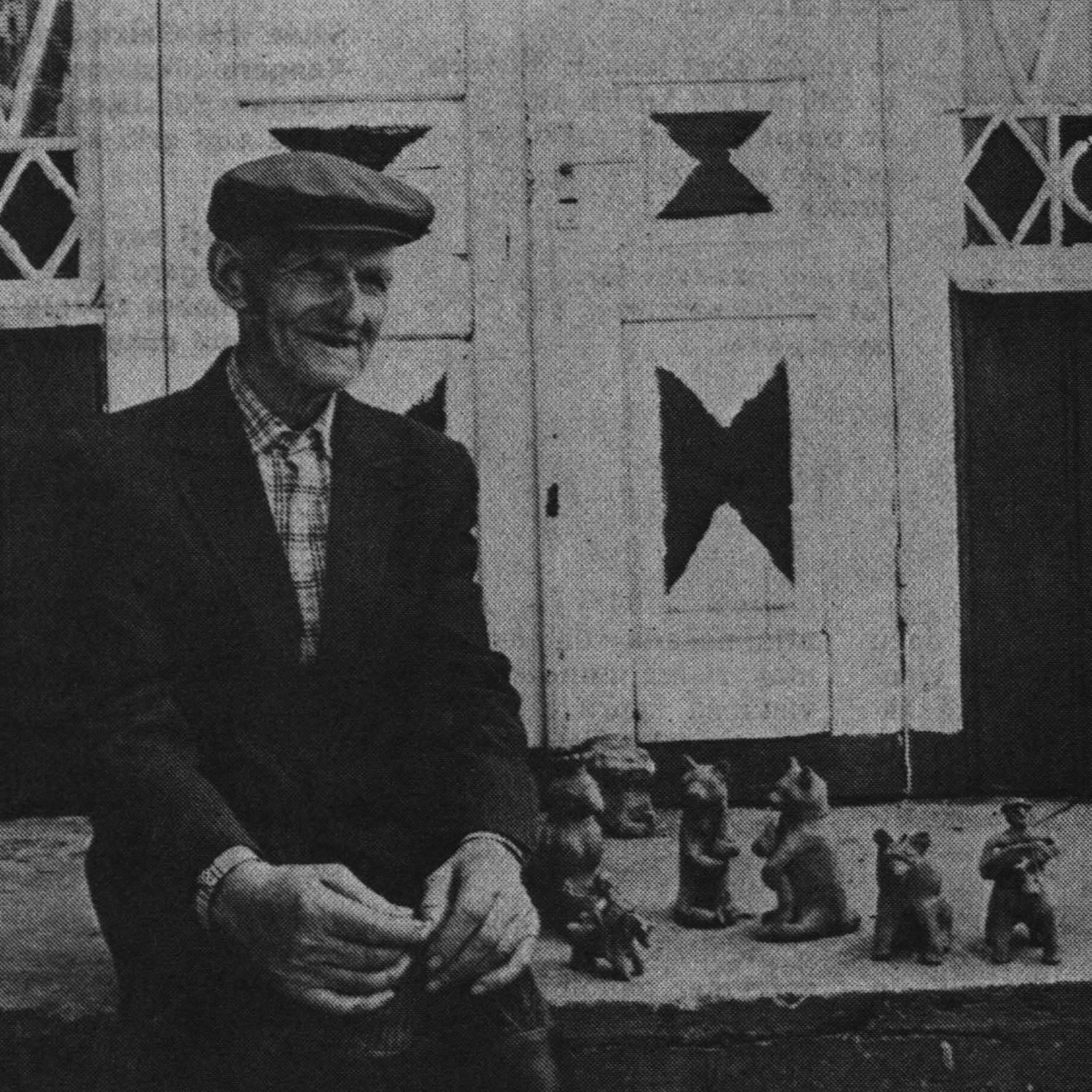
- Kāpostiņš with his works in 1985
- Born: Odumeņš Kopusteņš; 27 July 1905; Puša Parish, Russian Empire
- Died: 7 February 1987 (aged 81); Puša Parish, Soviet Union
- Known for: Ceramics
- Movement: Latgalian ceramics
- Spouse: Veneranda Kopusteņa
- Awards: Andrejs Paulāns Medal (1981)

Ādams Kāpostiņš (Latgalian: Odumeņš Kopusteņš, 27 July 1905 – 7 February 1987) was a Latvian and Latgalian ceramicist.

== Biography ==
Ādams Kāpostiņš was born at Puša village in Puša Parish, Russian Empire in 1905. He became a ceramicist in 1919, at the age of 14, continuing the family tradition. His grandfather and father were also ceramicists.

One of Kāpostiņš trademarks were face jugs and ceramic figures. His works were selected for the exhibitions since 1955. Kāpostiņš had a personal exhibition in Rēzekne at his 75th-anniversary in 1980 and his works were also displayed in exhibitions outside the Latvian SSR.

Kāpostiņš died in Puša on 7 February 1987.

== Legacy ==
In 2015, there was an exposition in the Rainis Museum in Jasmuiža Manor, dedicated to the 110th jubilee of Kāpostiņš. It featured a renovated unique tile stove that was relocated from ceramicists house in Puša, originally made by Kāpostiņš.

== Honors ==
- 1981: Andrejs Paulāns Medal
