= Feimaņi =

Village in Latvia

- Village
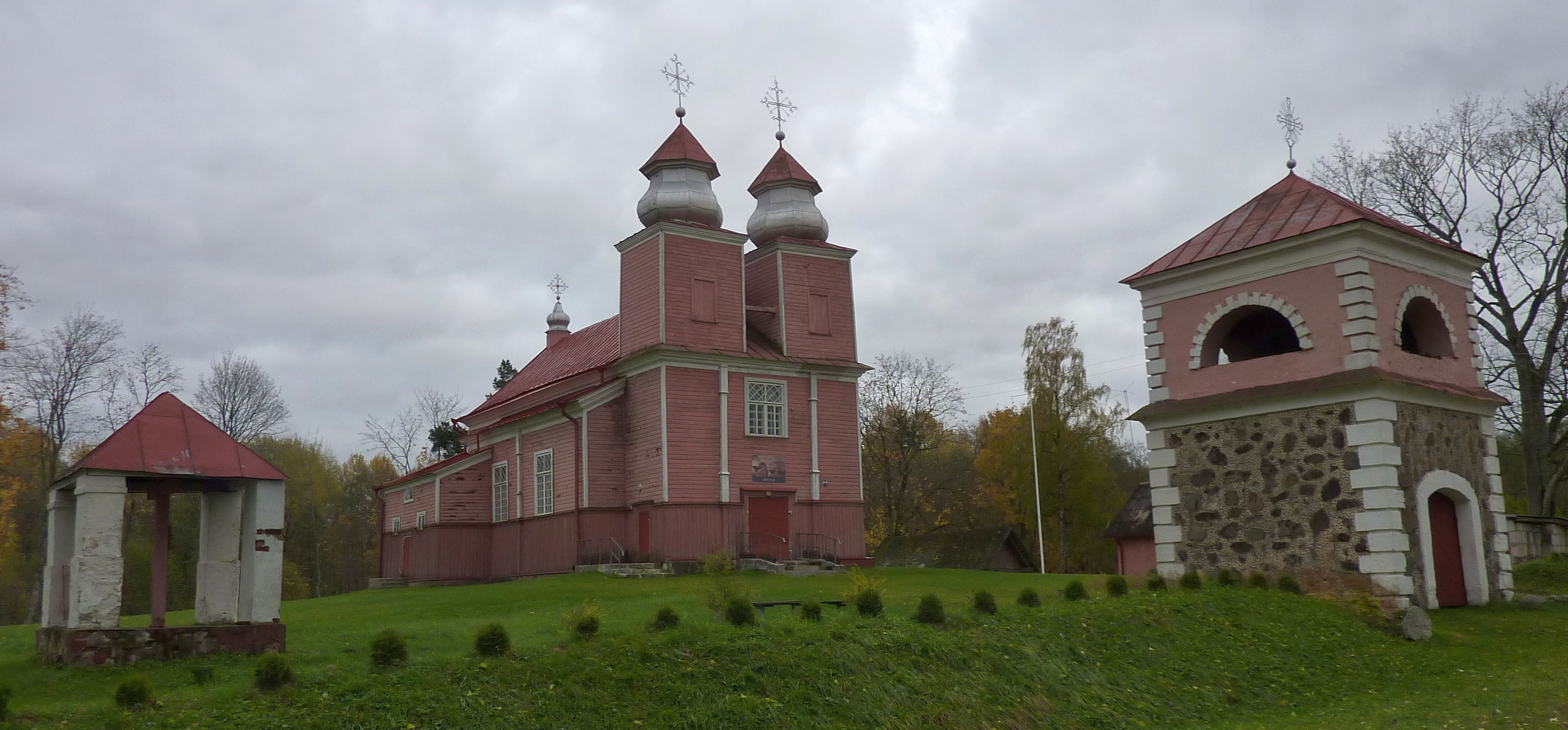
- Saint John the Baptist church in Feimaņi

- Location in Latvia
- Coordinates: 56°16′N 27°02′E
- Country: Latvia
- Municipality: Rēzekne Municipality
- Elevation: 165 m (541 ft)

Population (2020)
  - Total: 298
- Time zone: UTC+2 (EET)
  - Summer (DST): UTC+3 (EEST)
- Postal code: LV-4623
- Calling code: +371 657
- Website: feimani.lv

Feimaņi; (Polish: Fejmany, German: Fehmen) is a village in Latgale, in Rēzekne Municipality. Feimaņi is the administrative centre of Feimaņi Parish. It is located 33 kilometers from the municipality centre Rēzekne and 229 kilometers away from the capital city of Latvia, Riga. The population as of 2020 was 298.

== History ==
According to Geographical Dictionary of the Kingdom of Poland, the village of Feimaņi was first mentioned in 1558. The village was owned by the Korff family until 1715. In the period of Reformation, the Korff family switched from Catholicism to Lutheranism and the village's wooden church was handed to them. In 1708, Jesuit Order took the church back.

== Geography ==
Feimaņi is located nearby the Feimaņi lake, on its eastern coast. The river Feimanka flows from the lake. The village is 165 meters above sea level and it is located in the western part of the Latgale Upland.

== Transport ==
=== Roads ===
The European route E262 that connects Kaunas and Ostrov passes nearby the village.

=== Railway ===
In 1860, Feimaņi became a part of the Saint Petersburg–Warsaw railway line. The Krāce Station in the village was opened in 1926.
