= Šembeļi =

Village in Latvia

- Village
- Location in Latvia
- Coordinates: 56°14′N 26°59′E
- Country: Latvia
- Municipality: Preiļi Municipality
- Elevation: 168.3 m (552 ft)

Population (2020)
  - Total: 0
- Time zone: UTC+2 (EET)
  - Summer (DST): UTC+3 (EEST)
- Postal code: LV-5329

Šembeļi was a village in Preiļi Municipality in the Latgale region of Latvia. It was home of the famous Latgalian ceramicists, such as Andrejs Paulāns. It is located 219 kilometers from the capital city of Latvia, Riga.

== History ==
During the Russian Empire period, the Saint Petersburg–Warsaw railway line was built nearby the village in 1860.

Towards the end of 19th century, pottery craft was common in Šembeļi. In 1896, there was born the famous Latgalian ceramicist Andrejs Paulāns, who was awarded with a Gold Medal at the Paris Exhibition in 1937. He continued to work in his workshop in Šembeļi until his death in 1973.
