= Polikarps Čerņavskis =

Latvian artist (1923–1997)

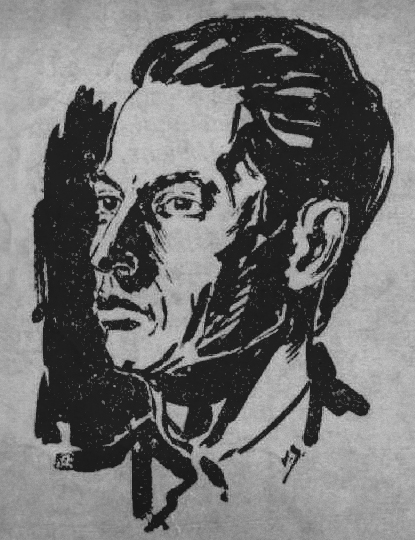
- Portrait of Čerņavskis (1959)
- Born: Polikarps Čerņavskis; 8 May 1923; Silajāņi Parish, Latvia
- Died: 25 January 1997 (aged 73); Preiļi, Latvia
- Known for: Ceramics
- Movement: Latgalian ceramics
- Spouse: Staņislava Čerņavska
- Awards: Order of the Three Stars (1996)

Polikarps Čerņavskis (8 May 1923 – 25 January 1997) was a Latgalian ceramicist. In 1996, he was awarded with the Order of the Three Stars.

== Biography ==
Polikarps Čerņavskis was born at Jurīši village in Silajāņi Parish, Latvia in 1923. He inherited the interest for pottery from his godfather, renowned Latgalian ceramicist Polikarps Vilcāns, who became his mentor.

During the World War II, Čerņavskis was drafted into the Nazi Germany army in 1943. After war, he was sent to Soviet filtration camp in Kutaisi and he returned to Latvia in 1948. After his return, Čerņavskis worked in the workshop of his godfather Polikarps Vilcāns.

He was one of the Latgalian ceramicists that was represented in 1957 Silajāņi ceramics exhibition in Rīga, organized by Jānis Pujāts. After this exhibition, his works were noticed and chosen for several international exhibitions, in Switzerland, USA, Germany, Romania and Cuba. In 1959, Čerņavskis became a member of Artist's Union of Latvia. In 1983, he moved to Preiļi and opened his workshop there.

In 1996, he was awarded with the Order of the Three Stars for his contributions and achievements in the Latgalian ceramics.

Čerņavskis died on 25 January 1997. He is buried in the Preiļi cemetery.

== Honors ==
- 1983: Andrejs Paulāns Medal
- 1989: People's Artist of the Latvian SSR
- 1996: Order of the Three Stars
