= Staņislavs Kreics =

Latvian landscape painter

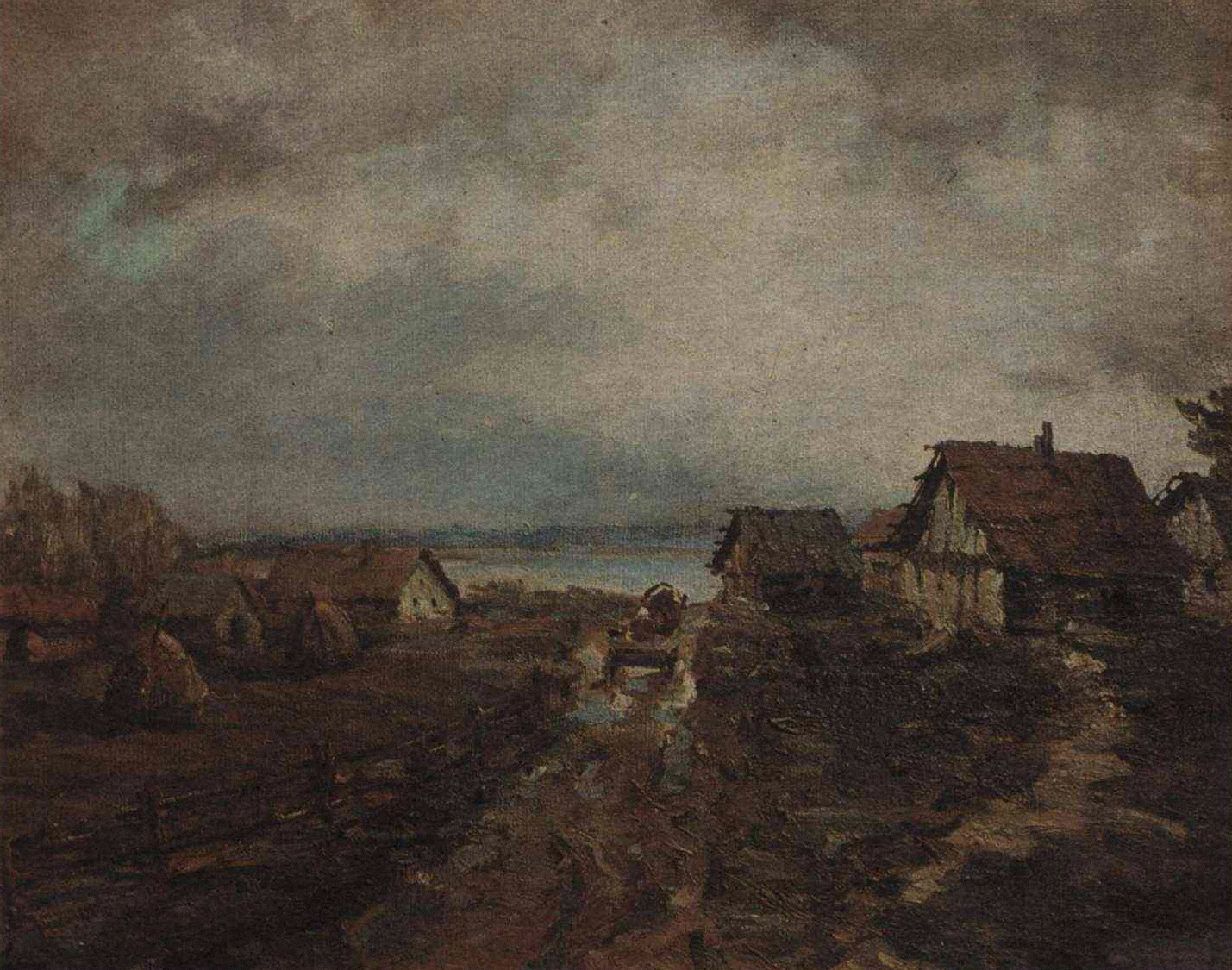
- Painting Latgale by Kreics
- Born: 1 July 1909; Daugavpils
- Died: 7 January 1992 (aged 82); Rīga
- Known for: Painting
- Movement: Landscape

Staņislavs Kreics (1 July 1909 – 7 January 1992) was a Latvian landscape painter. Kreics was also known for his maritime paintings.

== Biography ==
Staņislavs Kreics was born at Daugavpils. After graduation of primary school, Kreics worked as a photographer in Ilūkste. From 1938 to 1947, he studied in the Latvian Academy of Arts. There he was a pupil of several Latvian artists, including Vilhelms Purvītis, who was the leader of the landscape painting workshop.

Throughout his career, Kreics created more than 5000 artworks and had more than 20 personal exhibitions. The favorite motif of Kreics paintings were the landscapes of his native Latgale and the sights of the Baltic Sea.
