= Feimaņi Parish =

Parish of Latvia

- parish of Latvia
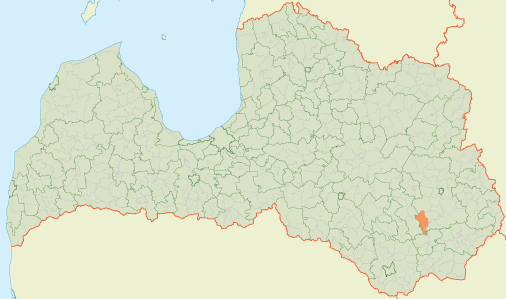
- Coordinates: 56°16′26″N 27°03′09″E
- Country: Latvia

Population (1 January 2026)
  - Total: 629
- Time zone: Eastern European Time
- Website: http://www.feimani.lv/

Feimaņi Parish (Latvian: Feimaņu pagasts) is an administrative unit of Rēzekne Municipality in the Latgale region of Latvia. The administrative centre is the village of Feimaņi.
