= Jānis Pujāts (art historian) =

Latgalian art historian

- Born: Juoņs Pujats; 18 October 1925; Gaigalava Parish, Latgale, Latvia
- Died: 19 July 1988 (aged 62); Rīga, Latvian SSR
- Known for: Art history
- Notable work: Latgales keramika. 19. gs. vidus–20. gs. 80. gadi

Jānis Pujāts (Latgalian: Juoņs Pujats; 18 October 1925 – 19 July 1988) was a Latgalian art historian, known for the popularization of Latgalian pottery in the Soviet years. Author of books about Latgalian pottery.

== Biography ==
Pujāts was born on 18 October 1925 in Gaigalava Parish (present-day Rēzekne Municipality), Latgale, Latvia. By his contemporaries, he is called the Godather of Latgalian ceramics for his efforts in the popularization of Latgalian pottery in the Soviet period. In the 50's, Pujāts started to travel around the Latgale and collect the information about local ceramicists for his publications. He organized exhibitions in Latvia and outside its borders that showcased the works of Latgalian potters such as Andrejs Paulāns, Polikarps Vilcāns, Polikarps Čerņavskis, Antons Ušpelis and others.

Pujāts died in Rīga on 19 July 1988, at the age of 62.
