= Rušona Parish =

Parish of Latvia

- parish of Latvia
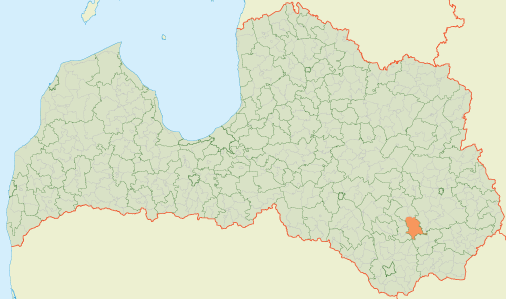
- 56°13′45″N 26°54′58″E
- Country: Latvia

Area
  - Total: 205.84 km^{2} (79.48 sq mi)
  - Land: 173.19 km^{2} (66.87 sq mi)
  - Water: 32.65 km^{2} (12.61 sq mi)

Population (1 January 2024)
  - Total: 1,226
  - Density: 6.0/km^{2} (15/sq mi)

Rušona Parish (Latvian: Rušonas pagasts, Latgalian: Rušyuna pogosts) is an administrative unit of Preiļi Municipality in the Latgale region of Latvia. At the beginning of 2014, the population of the parish was 1590. The administrative center is Kastīre village.

== Towns, villages and settlements of Rušona Parish ==
- Baški
- Gaiļmuiža
- Geļenova
- Kastīre
- Kliškova
- Rušona
