= Polikarps Vilcāns =

Latvian ceramicist

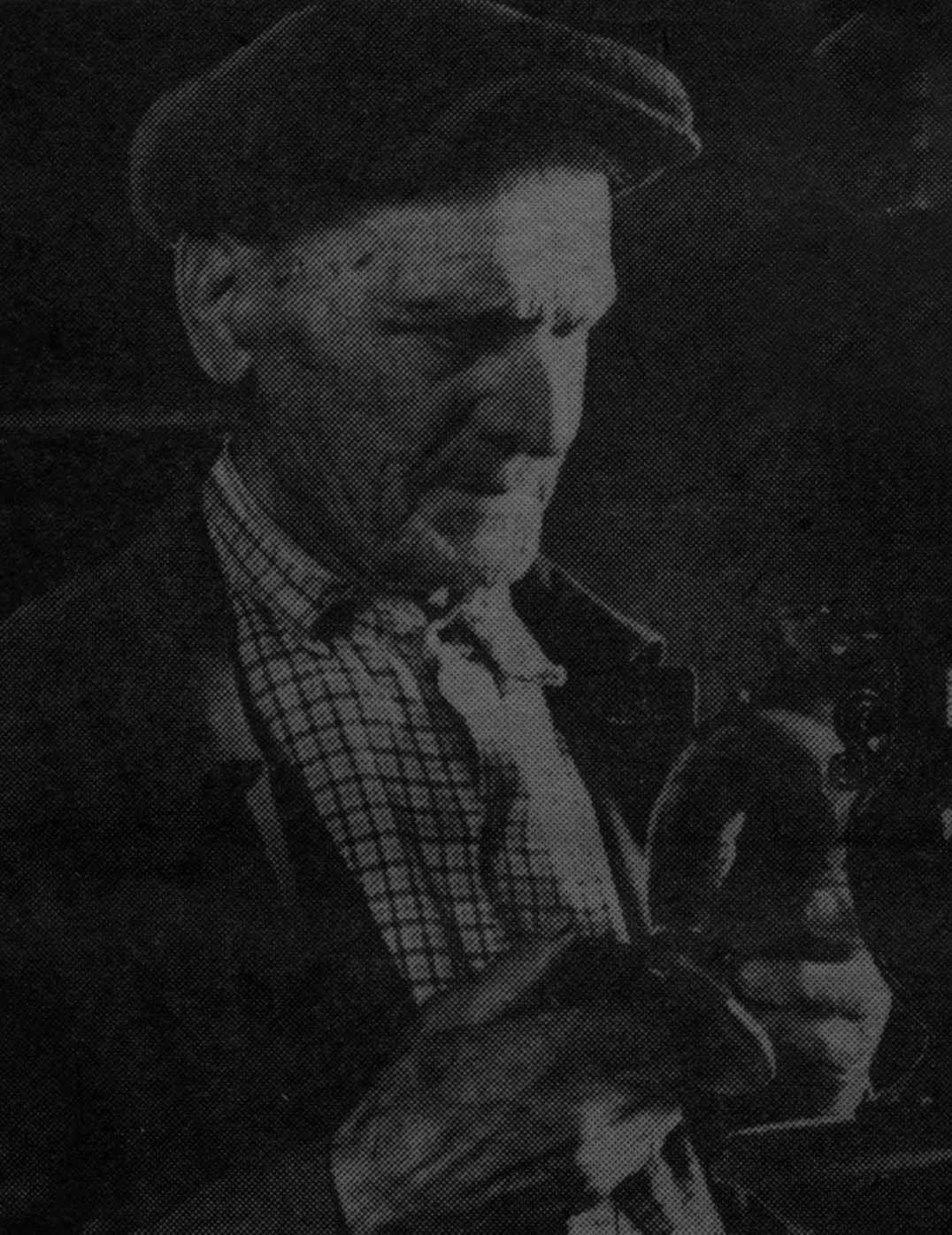
- Photo of Vilcāns in 1967
- Born: Polikarps Vilcāns; 26 January 1894; Silajāņi Parish, Russian Empire
- Died: 8 May 1969 (aged 75); Silajāņi Parish, Soviet Union
- Known for: Ceramics
- Movement: Latgalian ceramics
- Awards: Gold Medal at 1937 Paris Exhibition

Polikarps Vilcāns (26 January 1894 – 8 May 1969) was a Latvian and Latgalian ceramicist. One of the most renowned Latgalian ceramicists. In 1937, Vilcāns was awarded with a Gold Medal at the Paris Exhibition.

== Biography ==
Polikarps Vilcāns was born at Dūbes village in Silajāņi Parish, Russian Empire in 1894. He learned the craft of ceramicist from his father Joahims and successfully fired his first kiln at the age of 16. After the 1917 October Revolution, Vilcāns fought against the Kolchak's army in the Eastern Front.

He and Paulāns were the first Latgalian ceramicists to create a large candlesticks with a numerous prickets that eventually became a trademark of the Latgalian ceramics. His works were exhibited in Soviet Union and abroad, in France, Germany and other countries. Other Latgalian ceramicists, such as Polikarps Čerņavskis and Antons Ušpelis cited Vilcāns as their influencer and teacher.

He was one of two Latgalian ceramicists, alongside his cousin Andrejs Paulāns who were awarded with a Gold Medal at the 1937 Paris Exhibition. In 1958, Vilcāns was recognized as the People's Artist of the Latvian SSR.

Vilcāns died on 8 May 1969. He is buried in the Antonišķi cemetery.

== Honors ==
- 1937: Gold Medal at the 1937 Paris Exhibition
- 1958: People's Artist of the Latvian SSR
