= Silajāņi Parish =

Parish of Latvia

- parish of Latvia
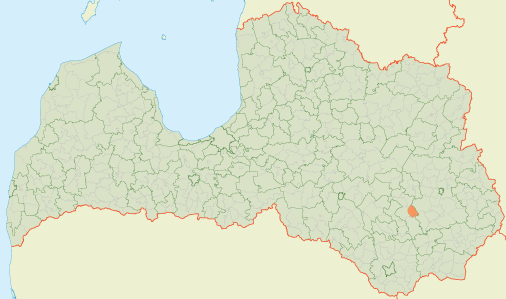
- 56°21′17″N 26°54′24″E
- Country: Latvia

Area
  - Total: 70.52 km^{2} (27.23 sq mi)
  - Land: 69.38 km^{2} (26.79 sq mi)
  - Water: 1.14 km^{2} (0.44 sq mi)

Population (1 January 2024)
  - Total: 293
  - Density: 4.2/km^{2} (11/sq mi)

Silajāņi Parish (Latvian: Silajāņu pagasts, Latgalian: Solujuoņu pogosts) is an administrative unit of Preiļi Municipality in the Latgale region of Latvia. At the beginning of 2014, the population of the parish was 456. The administrative center is Silajāņi village.

== Towns, villages and settlements of Silajāņi parish ==
- Bikova
- Kotļerova
- Rozalina
- Silajāņi
