= Latgalian pottery =

Subset of Latvian pottery

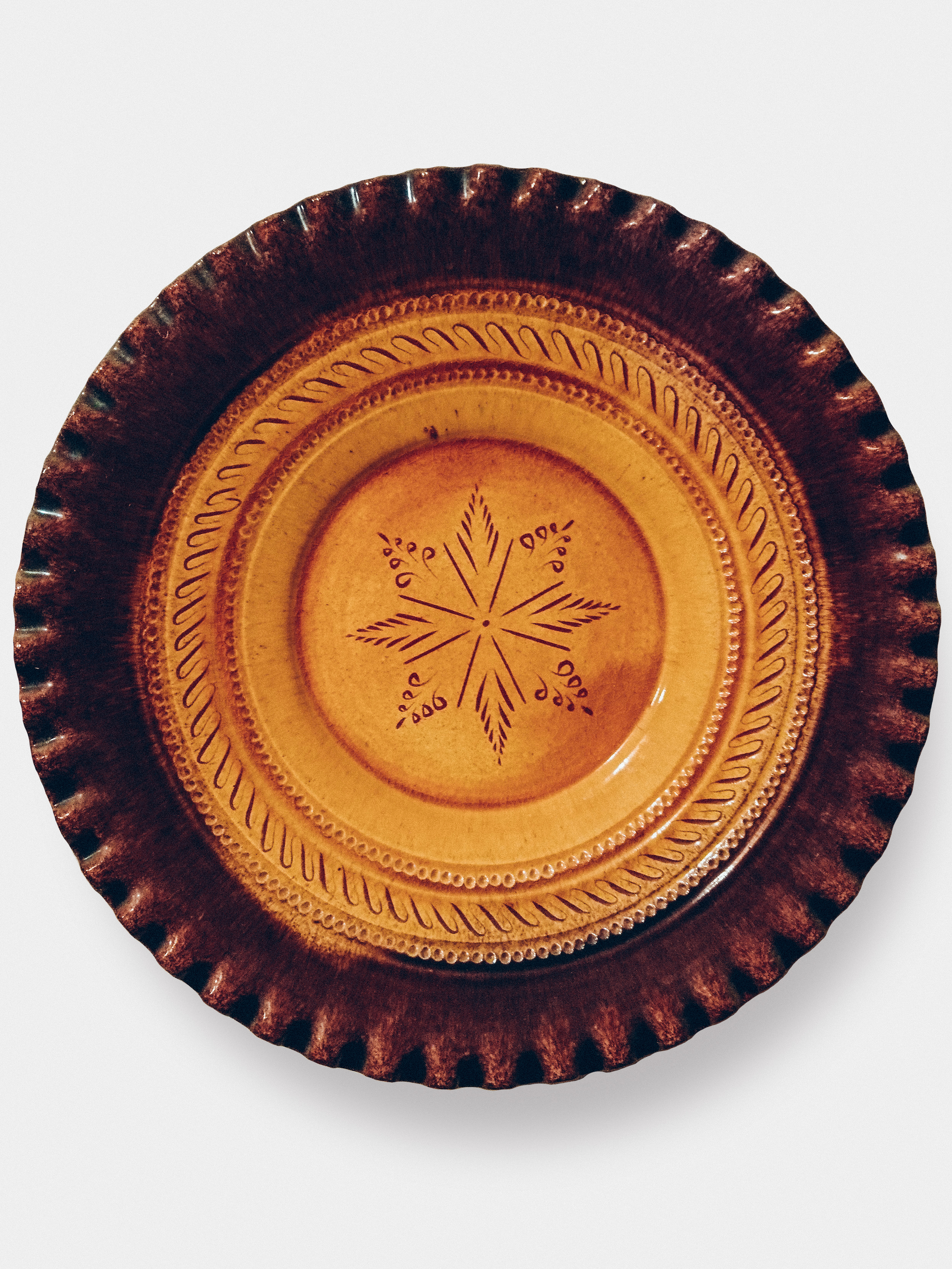
A decorative plate made by the famous Latgalian ceramicist Polikarps Čerņavskis

Latgalian pottery (Latgalian: Latgolys pūdnīceiba, Latvian: Latgales podniecība) or Latgalian ceramics (Latgolys keramika, Latgales keramika), also known as Silajāņi ceramics is the best-known subset of Latvian pottery. The region of Latgale historically has been the most prolific producer of wares. Latgalian ceramics rose to the popularity in the Soviet period, when art historian Jānis Pujāts wrote books about the best Latgalian ceramicists and organized several exhibitions to showcase their works.

== Types of ware ==
Most of the types of wares of Latgalian ceramics were used in the local households for everyday use. Examples include vuoraunīks (a pot for cooking), madaunīks (a pot for honey storage), sloinīks (a pot for storing fruit preserves), stuodiņs (a pot for storing sour cream), ļaks (a vessel for storage of oil), pīna pūds (a pot for storing cow's milk), kazeļnīks (a pot for goat milk storage), puorūss (lit. "over-handle", a vessel for bringing food to the field), bļūda (bowl), kryuze (a jug or a mug, most often for beer or milk).

For decorative purposes, Latgalian ceramicists were making candlesticks (svečturi) and human, animal, folk figure shaped ocarinas (sviļpaunīki).

== Museum collections ==
In Rainis Museum in Jasmuiža are located the relocated workshop and kiln of Andrejs Paulāns from Šembeļi. In this museum, there is a renovated unique tile stove that was relocated from ceramicist Ādams Kāpostiņš house in Puša. Latgale Culture and History Museum has a collection of Latgalian ceramicist works.
