= Jasmuiža Manor =

Manor house in Latvia

- Latgale, Latvia
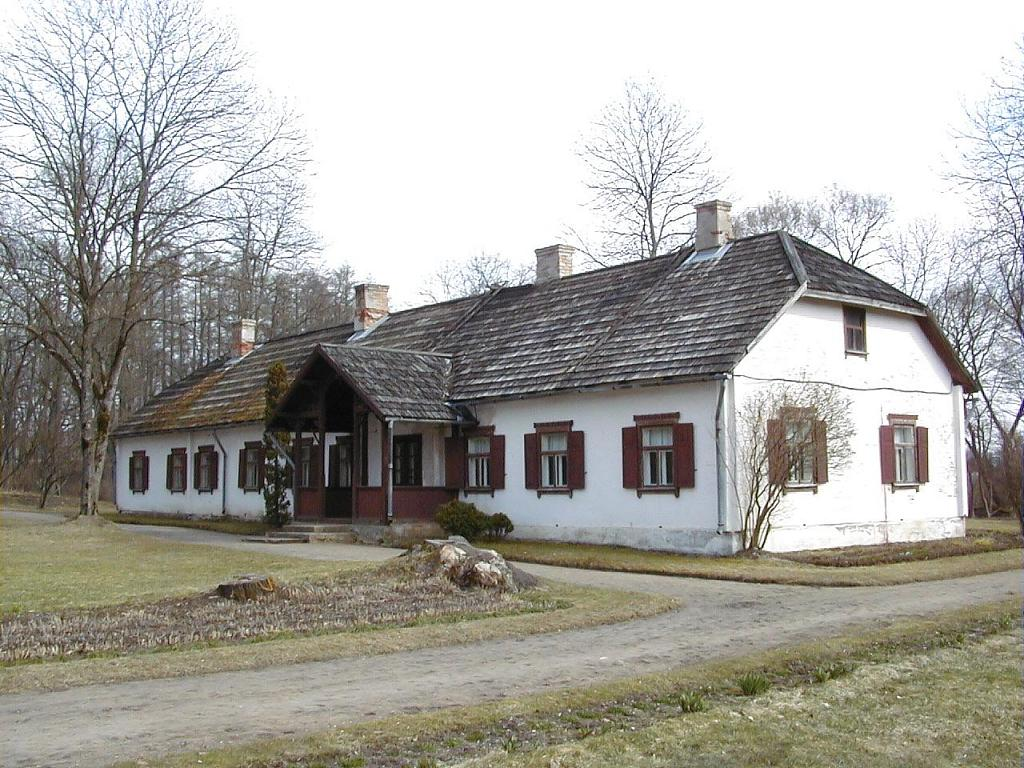
- Rainis memorial museum "Jasmuiža"

Site information
- Type: Manor

Location
- Coordinates: 56°12′08.6″N 26°47′05.3″E

Site history
- Built: 1891

Jasmuiža Manor is a manor in Aizkalne Parish, Preiļi Municipality in the historical region of Latgale, in Latvia, currently a writer's home museum dedicated to Rainis.

== History ==
Construction of the wooden manor house near Aizkalne began in 1883 and was completed in 1891. The building now houses a museum open on 16 August 1964, dedicated to the Latvian writer Rainis whose father, Krišjānis Pliekšāns, managed the surrounding estate.

== See also ==
- List of palaces and manor houses in Latvia
