= Andrejs Paulāns =

Latvian ceramicist

- Andrivs Povulāns-Kraskevičs
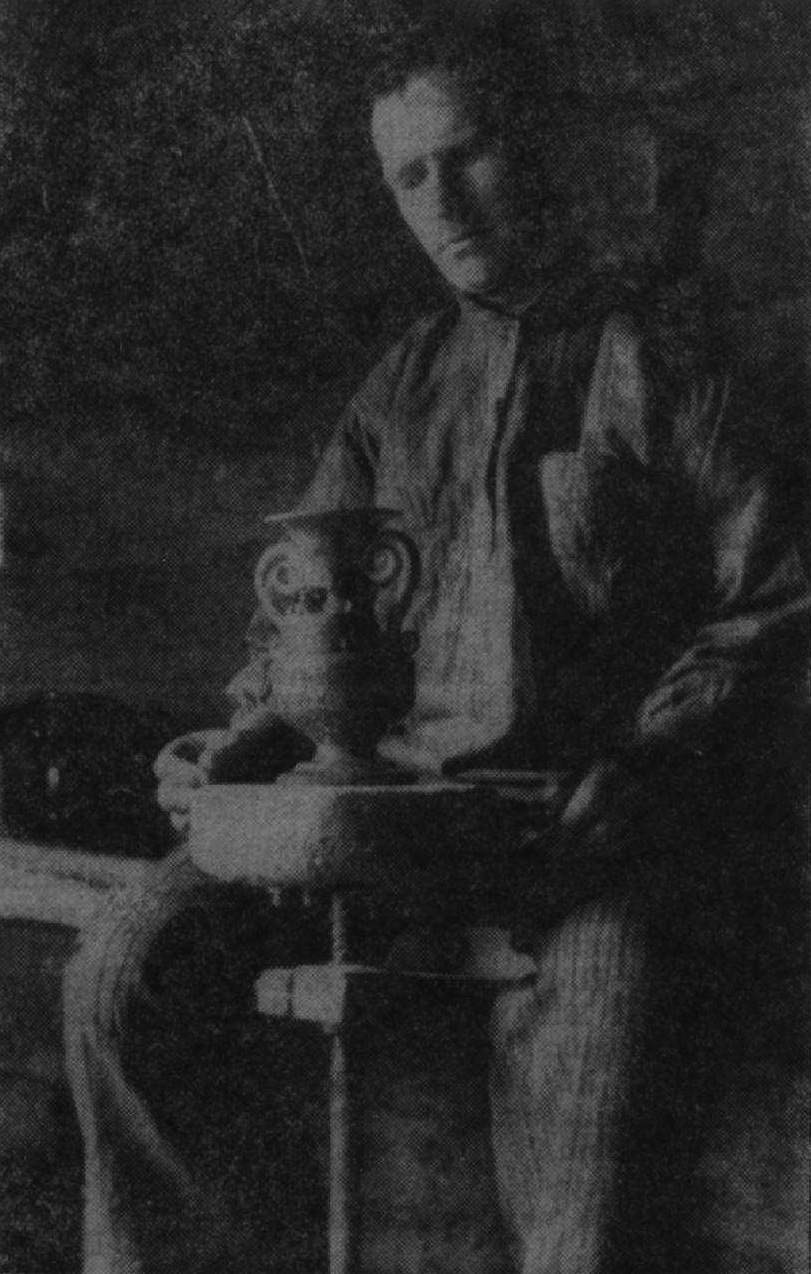
- Paulāns at work
- Born: Andrejs Paulāns-Kraskevičs; 30 November 1896; Silajāņi Parish, Russian Empire
- Died: 29 November 1973 (aged 76); Preiļi Parish, Soviet Union
- Known for: Ceramics
- Movement: Latgalian ceramics
- Awards: Gold Medal at 1937 Paris Exhibition

Andrejs Paulāns-Kraskevičs (Latgalian: Andrivs Povulāns-Kraskevičs, 30 November 1896 – 29 November 1973) was a Latvian and Latgalian ceramicist. He is regarded as one of the greatest Latgalian ceramicists. In 1937, Paulāns was awarded a gold medal at the Paris Exhibition.

== Biography ==
Andrejs Paulāns-Kraskevičs was born at Šembeļi village in Silajāņi Parish, Russian Empire in 1896. He inherited the interest for pottery from his father Izidors. In 1915, he joined Latvian riflemen as the World War I was going on. Two years later, Paulāns returned home after being heavily wounded in head and shoulder. For his service, he was awarded a Cross of St. George. Paulāns right eye was blinded for the rest of his life.

From 1918, Paulāns worked in the workshop of his father. His name rose to fame in the 1930s, when his works were shown in exhibitions outside Latvia. First foreign exhibition with Paulāns works was in 1931 in Sèvres, France. He was awarded a gold medal at the 1937 Paris Exhibition.

Paulāns died on 29 November 1973. He is buried in the Feimaņi cemetery.

== Legacy ==
Paulāns remains one of the most influential ceramicists in the Latgalian ceramics history. In Rainis Museum in Jasmuiža are located the relocated workshop and kiln of Andrejs Paulāns. In 1986, Latgale Ceramics Studio in Rēzekne was renamed to Andrejs Paulāns Folk Applied Art Studio. One of the streets in the Latgalian town of Preiļi is named in honor of Paulāns.

== Honors ==
- 1937: Gold Medal at the 1937 Paris Exhibition
- 1958: People's Artist of the Latvian SSR
