= Latgale =

Historical and cultural region of Latvia

Coordinates: 56.5225°N 27.0324°E

Latgale Latgola
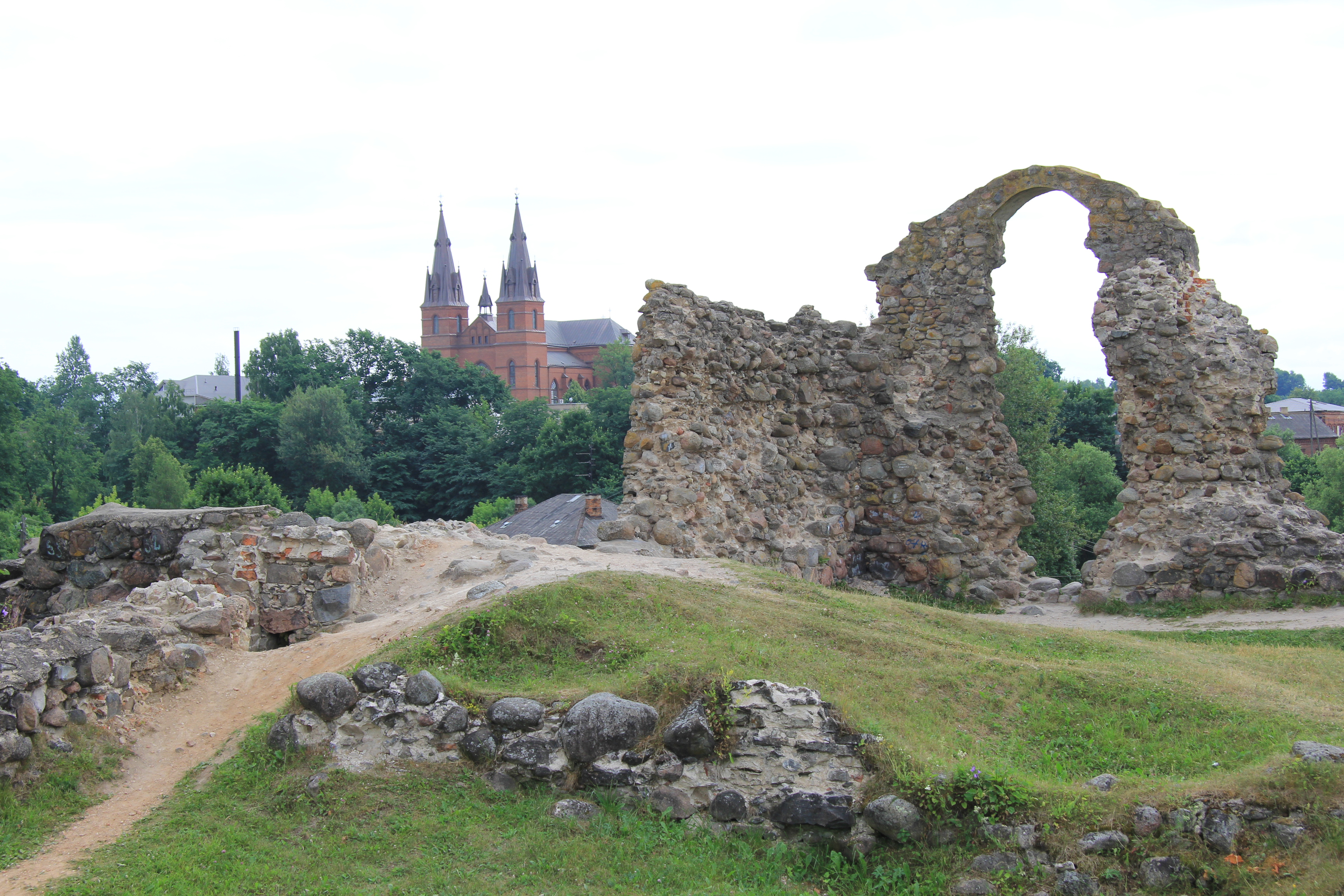
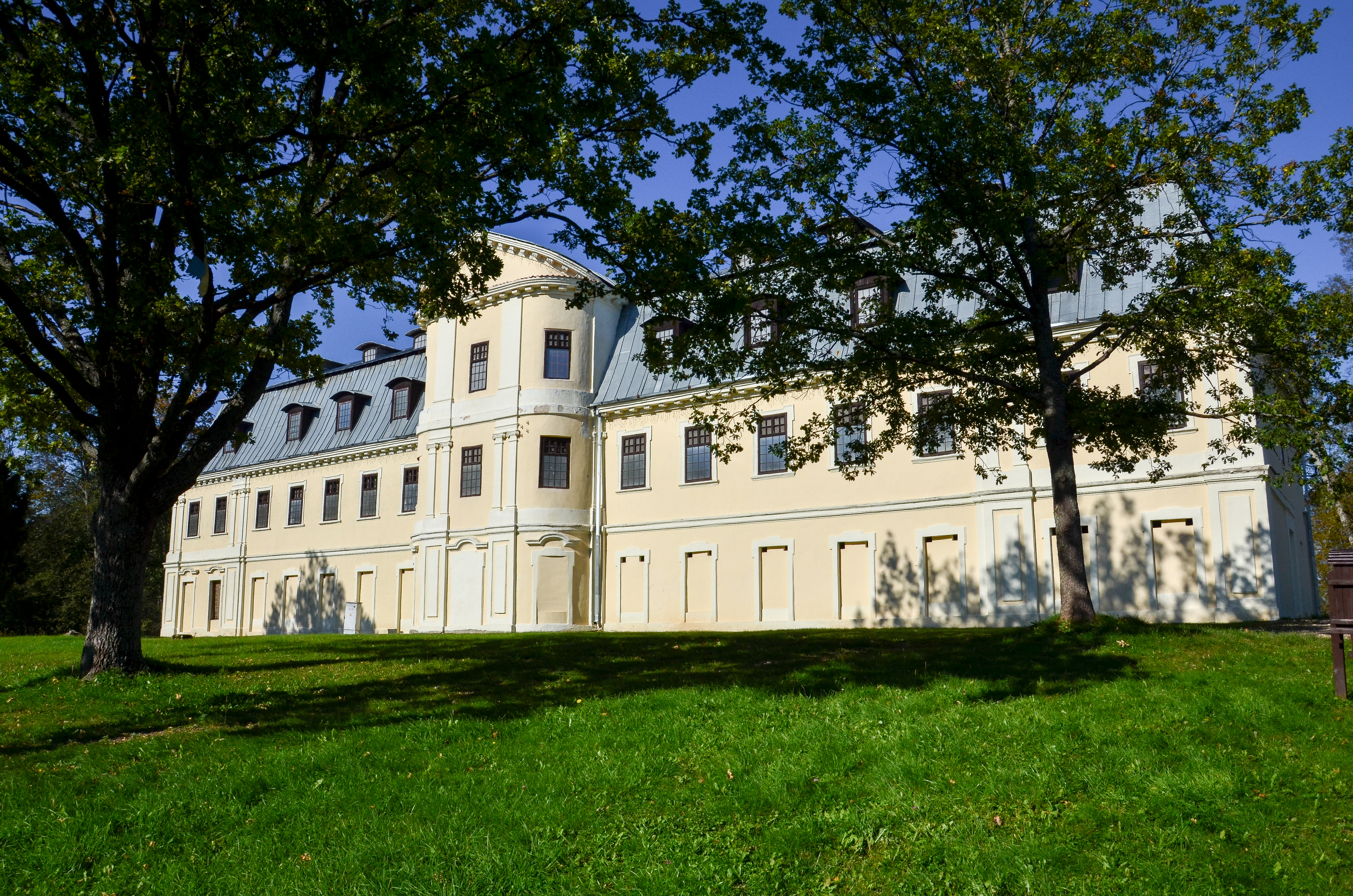
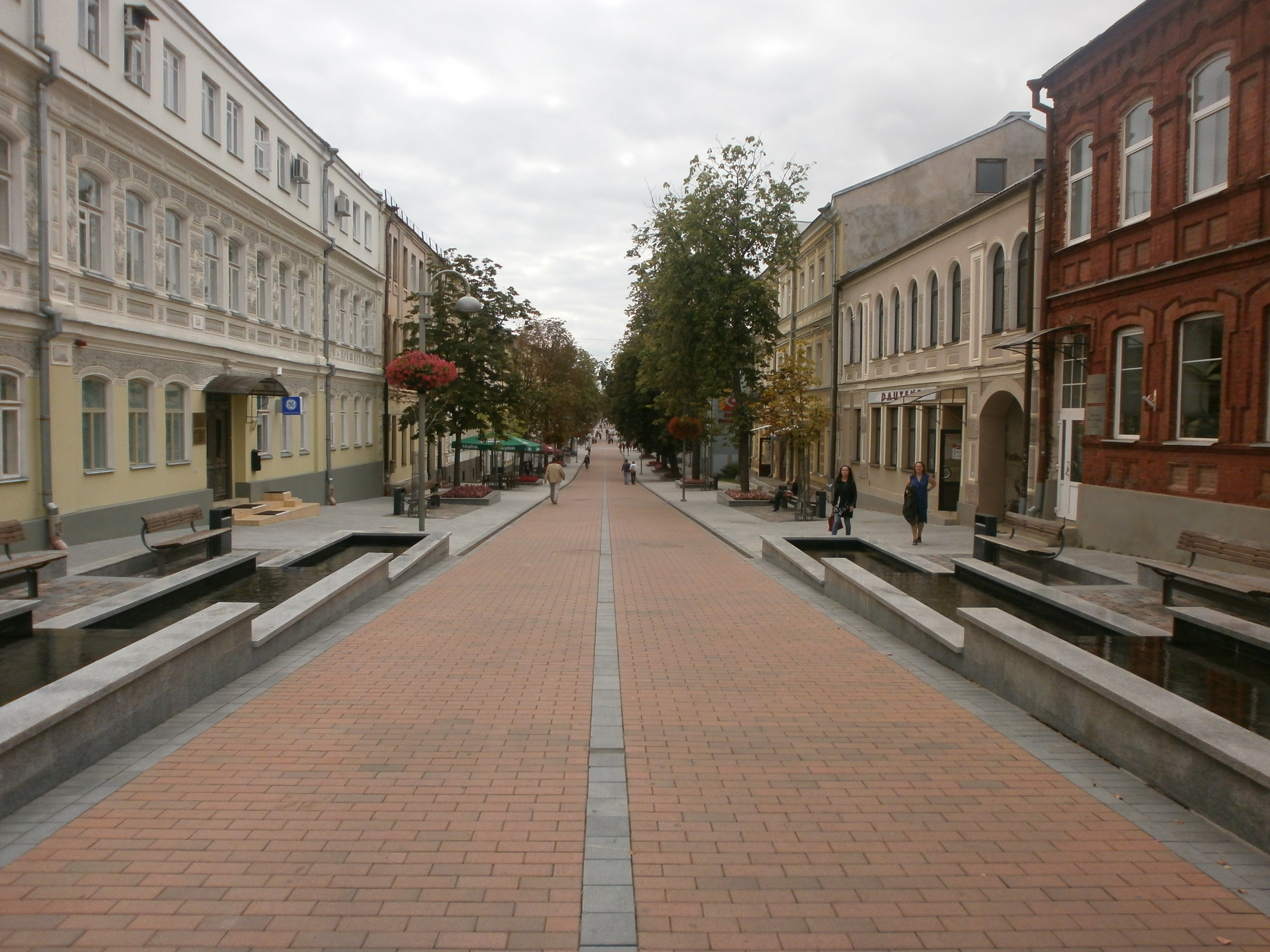
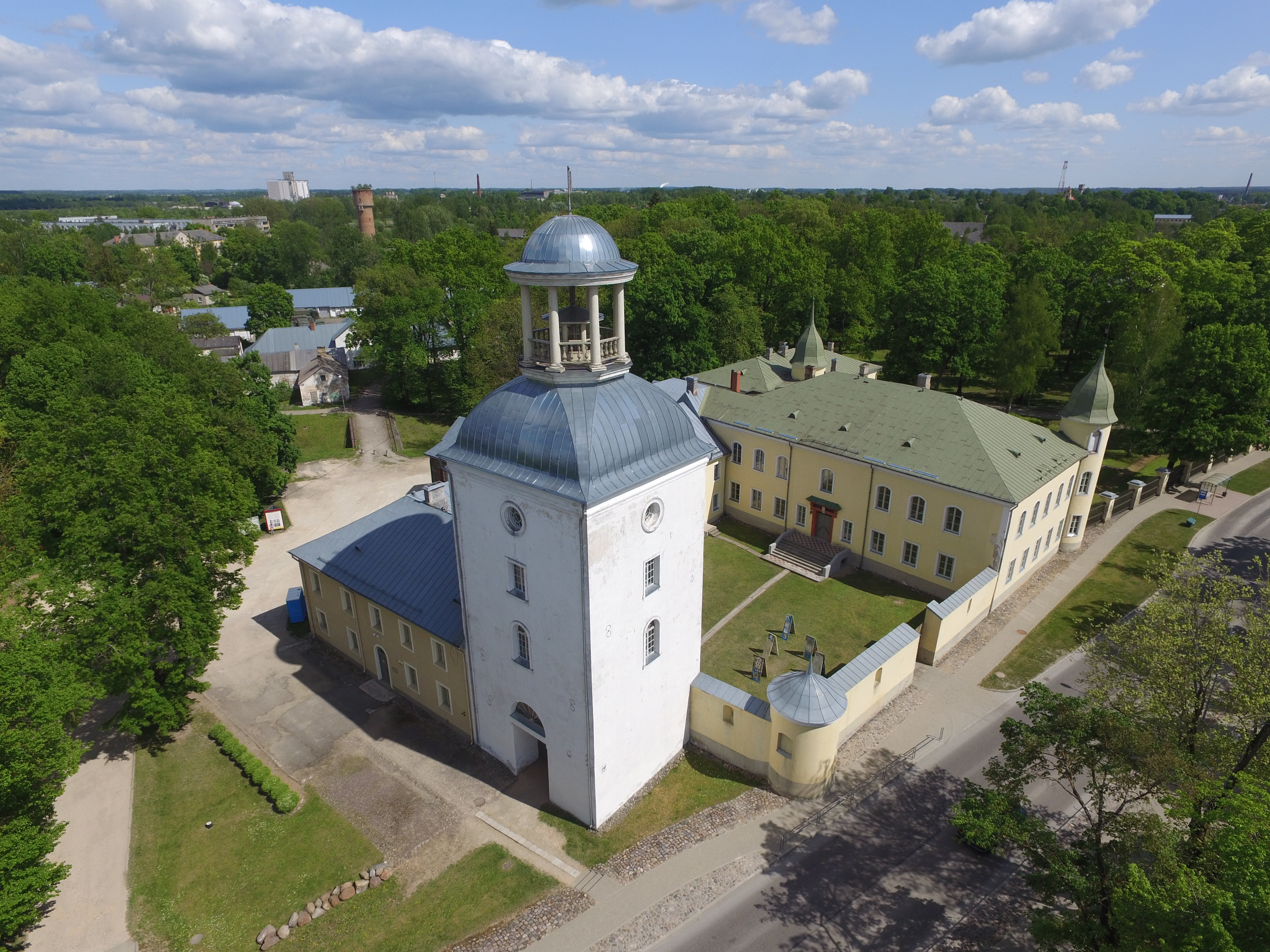
- From top, left to right: Rēzekne Castle ruins with Sacred Heart Cathedral, Rēzekne in background; Krāslava New Palace; Daugavpils; Krustpils Castle

- Flag Coat of arms

- Location of Latgale in Latvia
- Country: Latvia
- Largest city: Daugavpils

Area
  - Total: 14,547 km^{2} (5,617 sq mi)

Population (2020)
  - Total: 255,968
  - Density: 17.596/km^{2} (45.573/sq mi)
- Time zone: UTC+2 (EET)
  - Summer (DST): UTC+3 (EEST)
- HDI (2018): 0.810 very high · 6th

Latgale (Note: Latgalian: Latgola; Latvian: Latgale; Russian: Латгалия, romanized: Latgaliya; Polish: Łatgalia; German: Lettgallen; Belarusian: Латгалія, romanized: Lathalija; Belarusian Latin: Łathalija; Latin: Lettgallia), also known as Latgalia or Latgallia, is one of the Historical Latvian Lands. It is the easternmost region of the country and lies north of the Daugava River. While most of Latvia is historically Lutheran, Latgale is predominantly Catholic: 65.3% according to a 2011 survey. After the Counter-Reformation it was the northernmost predominantly Catholic province or region in Europe. There is a considerable Eastern Orthodox minority (23.8%), of which 13.8% are Russian Orthodox Christians and 10.0% are Old Believers. As of 2020, the region's population was 255,968.

The region has a large population of ethnic Russians, especially in Daugavpils, the largest city in the region and the location of the region's only public university, the University of Daugavpils. Many of the Russians who lived in Latgale before Soviet rule are Old Believers. Rēzekne, often called the heart of Latgale, Krāslava, and Ludza are other large towns in the region, which also has a Belarusian minority. There is also a significant Polish minority. As part of the Polotsk and Vitebsk guberniyas, the region was part of the Pale of Settlement and had a very large Jewish population – but many of the Jews were killed in WW2 and most of the remainder emigrated. Other than in Daugavpils, the Baltic German presence in Latgale was less sizable than in other regions of Latvia. According to the Latvian Official Statistics portal, Latgale is the only region of Latvia where the number of Slavs surpasses the number of ethnic Latvians.

Average incomes in the region are lower than in other parts of the country. Latgale also has the highest percentage of people at risk of poverty (32.7% in 2023) in Latvia.

== History ==
=== Name ===
Historically, several different forms of the name Latgalia have been used.

- Other names for the region include Lettigallia, Latgallia, and Latgola.
- The people are called latgalieši in Latvian (as distinct from latgaļi, which refers to the ancient tribe, though some modern Latgalians prefer latgaļi) – latgalīši in Latgalian, sometimes latgali – Latgalians, Latgallians, or Lettigalls in English, and are sometimes referred to as čangaļi (sometimes derogatory – the reference is to a novel, and Latgalians often call other Latvians "čiuļi"). The term latgalieši dates only to the early 20th century, and before that Latgalians were long referred to as Latvians or Inflantians (Latgalian: latvīši, inflantīši).

Since 2004, use of the Latgalian language has been the subject of a major sociolinguistic/ethnolinguistic poll and study, conducted by the Rēzekne Augstskola and the Centre d'Étude Linguistiques Pour l'Europe.

As of 2011 97,600 people in the region spoke Latgalian language, which is a standardised form of local varieties of High Latvian dialect.

=== Early history ===
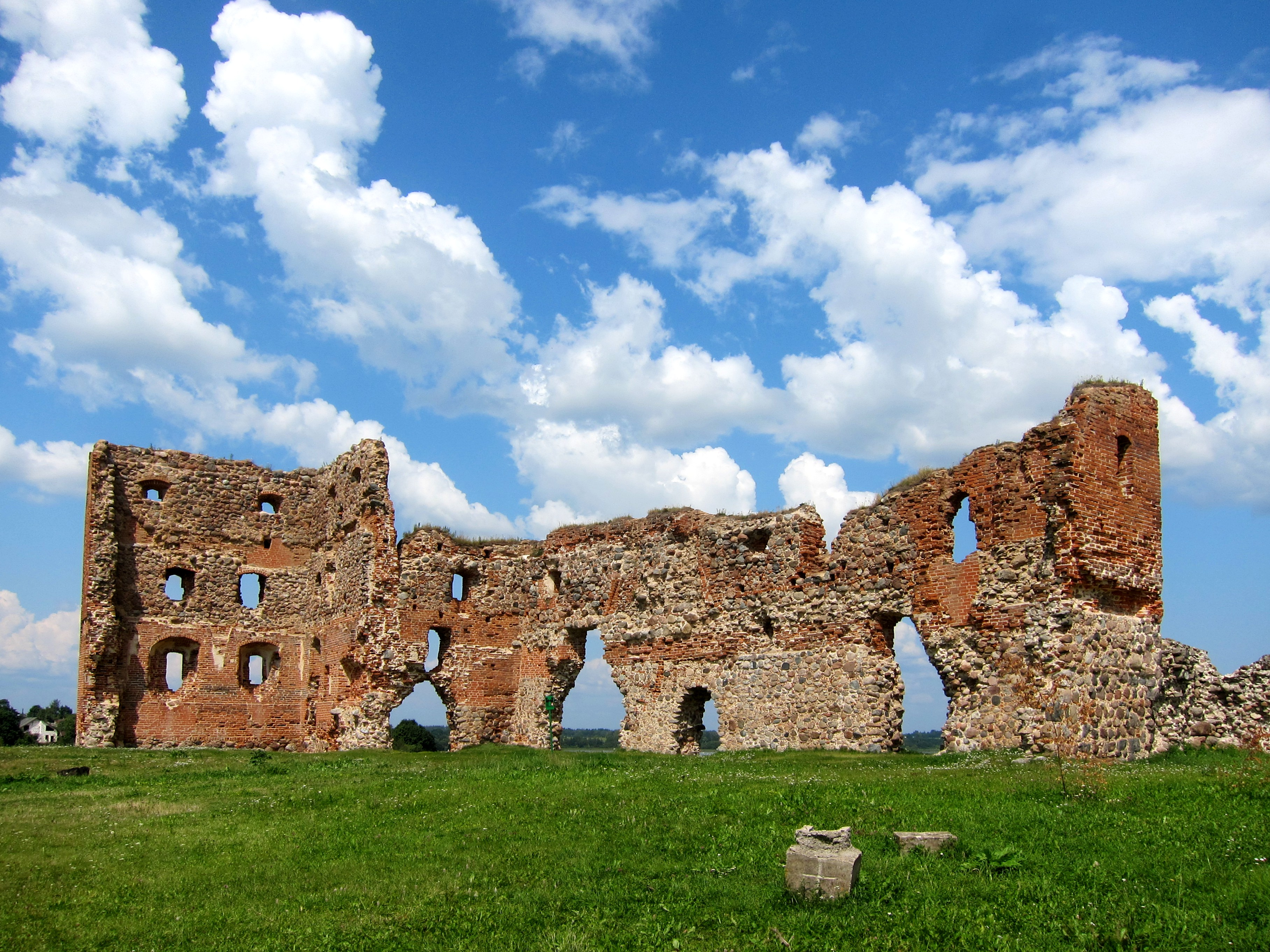
Ludza Castle ruins

Originally the territory of what is now Latgale was populated by the Eastern Baltic Latgalian tribe. During the 10th–12th centuries two principalities, Jersika and Atzele, existed on the territory of modern Latgale and Eastern Vidzeme. In addition Latgalians inhabited parts of modern Pskov Oblast in Russia and Vitebsk Region in Belarus.

In the first decade of the 13th century the Principality of Jersika, also known as Lettia, was allied with the Principality of Polotsk and Lithuanian dukes against the Bishopric of Livonia, but was defeated in 1209. Part of it was divided between the Bishopric and the Livonian Brothers of the Sword, the remainder became a vassal country. In 1239, after the death of King Visvaldis, the latter was incorporated into the territory of the Livonian Order.

In 1242, after defeat in the Battle of the Ice, eastern Latgale (Lotygola) temporarily passed to the Novgorod Republic. In 1263, Livonian knights started to build the Wolkenburg castle as the seat of an order convent near the Rāzna lake (today within the Rāzna National Park). It became the oldest order stronghold of the Latgale region.

In 1277, Grand duke Traidenis of Lithuania unsuccessfully besieged the newly built castle of Daugavpils.

=== Latgale as part of Polish–Lithuanian Commonwealth ===
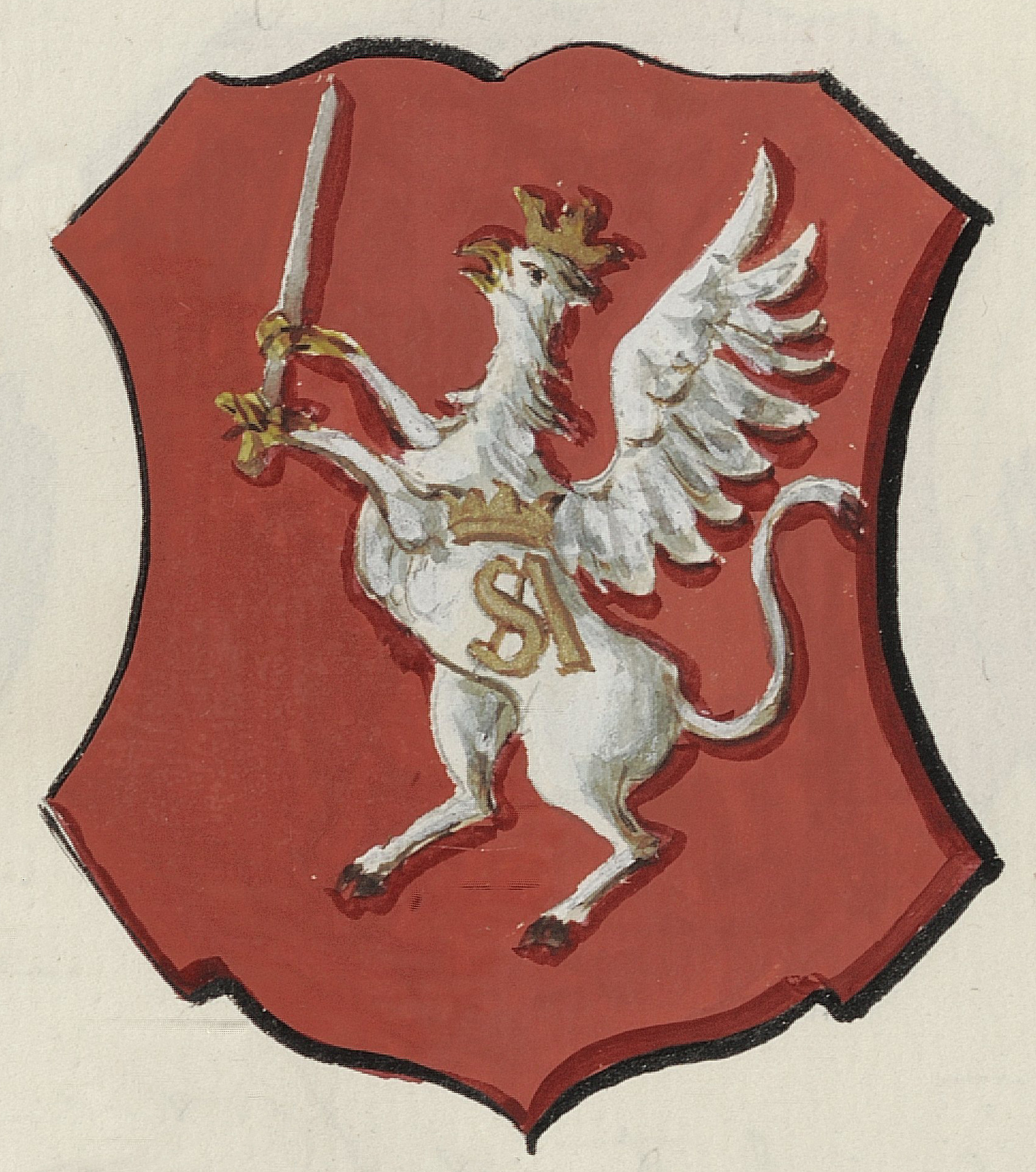
Historical Coat of Arms of Latgale, adopted in 1566

Latgalian territories remained a part of Livonian confederation until the Livonian War. During this war, Latgale was annexed by the Grand Duchy of Lithuania (1559–1562), which in 1569 was incorporated into the Polish–Lithuanian Commonwealth. Ivan IV of Russia annexed Latgale in 1577, but renounced his claims to Livonia after the successful Livonian campaign of the King of Poland and Grand Duke of Lithuania Stephen Báthory in Truce of Yam-Zapolsky on 15 January 1582.

In 1621 most of the Duchy of Livonia was ceded to the Swedish Empire, but part of the Duchy including Latgale remained under Polish-Lithuanian control. This became known as the Inflanty Voivodeship. The creation of Polish Inflanty is the birth of the region we now know of as Latgale. During this period the Latgalian language was influenced by Polish and developed separately from the Latvian spoken in other parts of Latvia.

=== Latgale as part of Russian Empire ===
In 1772, Latgale was annexed by the Russian Empire after the First Partition of Poland. Latgale was incorporated into the Vitebsk Governorate. In 1860, Daugavpils and Rēzekne became a part of the Saint Petersburg–Warsaw railway route. In 1865, as part of Russia's anti-Polish policies, a period of Russification was begun, during which the Latgalian language (written in Latin script) was forbidden.

This ban was lifted in 1904, and a period of Latgalian reawakening began. Two years later, Latgalian politician Francis Trasuns was elected as a member of the State Duma of the Russian Empire.

=== Latgale as part of independent Latvia ===
After the First Latgale Latvians Congress in 1917, it was decided that Dvinsky, Lyutsinsky and Rezhitsky Uyezds, populated mostly by Latvians should be transferred to Governorate of Livonia. It became a part of the Latvian Soviet autonomy of Iskolat and a part of the Latvian Socialist Soviet Republic on 17 December 1918.

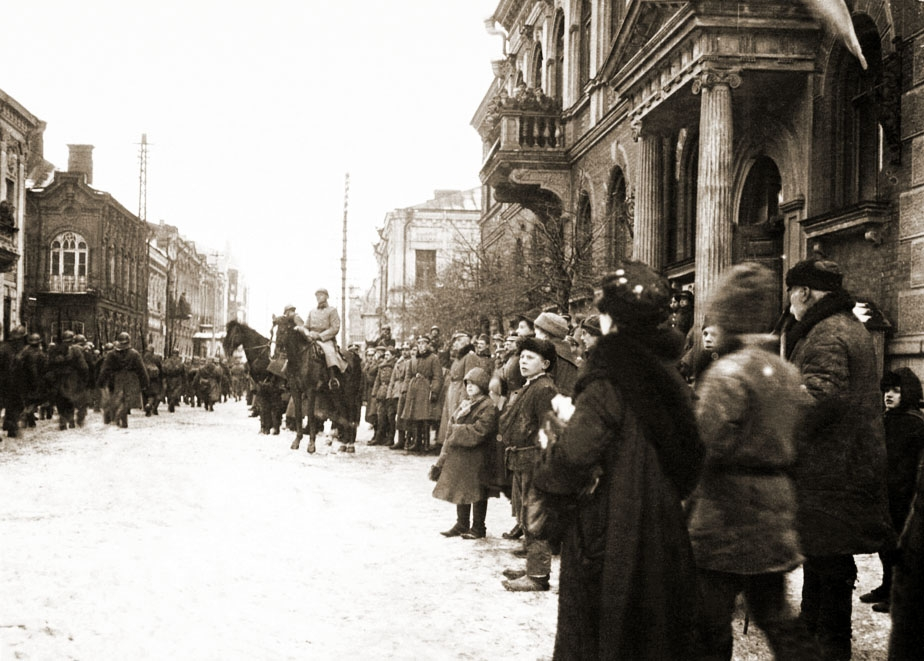
Polish 5th Legions' Infantry Regiment in Daugavpils following the Battle of Daugavpils, 1920

In January 1920, a joint force of Latvian and Polish armies defeated the Soviet 15th Army in the battle of Daugavpils which lead to the resignation of the government of Soviet Latvia on 13 January and Latvian-Russian cease-fire on 1 February 1920.

After signing of the Latvian–Soviet Peace Treaty, parts of the Vitebsk Governorate and Pskov Governorate were incorporated into the new Republic of Latvia. United with other ethnic Latvian territories, as claimed by the declaration of independence (ethnic borders as national borders), they formed the districts of Daugavpils, Ludza, Rēzekne and Jaunlatgale, later Abrene district.

=== Latgale during and after World War II ===
During the World War II, Latgale was first occupied by the Soviet Union in 1940 and by the Nazi Germany in 1941. In 1944, at the beginning of the second occupation of Latvia by the Soviet Union, the eastern municipalities of the Abrene district including Abrene were incorporated into the Russian SFSR.

Following the dissolution of the Soviet Union and the restoration of Latvian independence in 1991, Latgale regained its status of one of the cultural regions of the Republic of Latvia.

== Geography ==
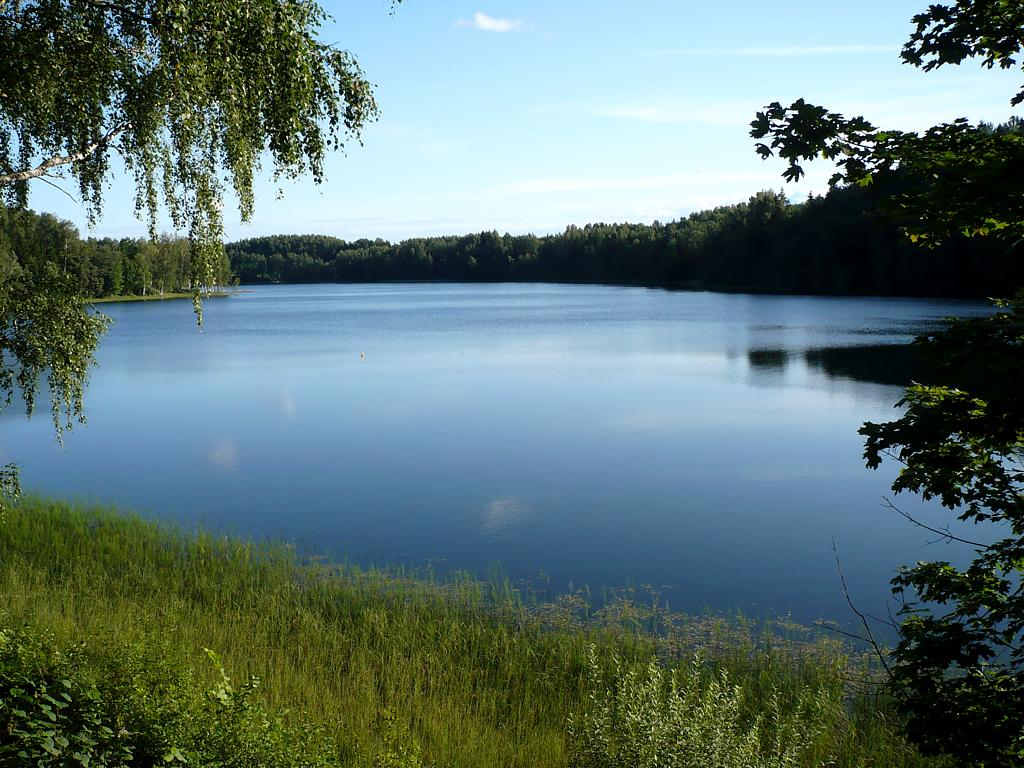
A view on Lake Drīdzis.

The land size of Latgale is 14,547 km^{2} and it is bigger than some of the European countries, such as Montenegro, Cyprus and Luxembourg. Latgale is the easternmost region of Latvia and is located north of the Daugava River. It is a landlocked region that has no access to sea or ocean. It shares international borders with Russia and Belarus. The most populated cities in Latgale are Daugavpils (82,046) and Rēzekne (31,216).

The municipalities of Latvia that are a part of Latgale are Balvi Municipality, the city of Daugavpils, Ludza Municipality, Līvāni Municipality, Preiļi Municipality and Rēzekne Municipality, as well as parts of Alūksne Municipality (Liepna Parish), Augšdaugava Municipality, Jēkabpils Municipality (parts on the right bank of the Daugava), Krāslava Municipality (excluding Kaplava Parish), Madona Municipality (Barkava Parish, Murmastiene Parish, Varakļāni Parish and Varakļāni town and lower portion of Ošupe Parish) and half of Aiviekste Parish (on the left bank of Aizmata River) and the Gostiņi neighbourhood of Pļaviņas of Aizkraukle Municipality.

Latgale is known as The land of lakes due to large number of lakes in the region. The biggest lake in Latgale and second biggest in Latvia is Lake Rāzna in Rēzekne Municipality. Its area is 57.81 km^{2}. Lake Drīdzis, located in the Krāslava Municipality is the deepest lake in Latvia with a maximum depth of 65.1 meters. Dubna is the longest river in Latgale and 8th longest river in Latvia with a length of 120 kilometres. Other major rivers of the region are Rēzekne (116 km) and Malta (105 km).

The highest point of Latgale is Lielais Liepukalns, 289.8 meters high.

== Culture ==
Latgale region historically had its cultural differences in comparison to the rest of Latvia, such as religion, traditions, and language.

=== Religion ===
Religion in Latgale – 2011
Religion	Percent
Catholics	65.8%
Eastern Orthodoxy	13.8%
Old Believers	10.0%
Lutheranism	5.0%
No religion	5.8%

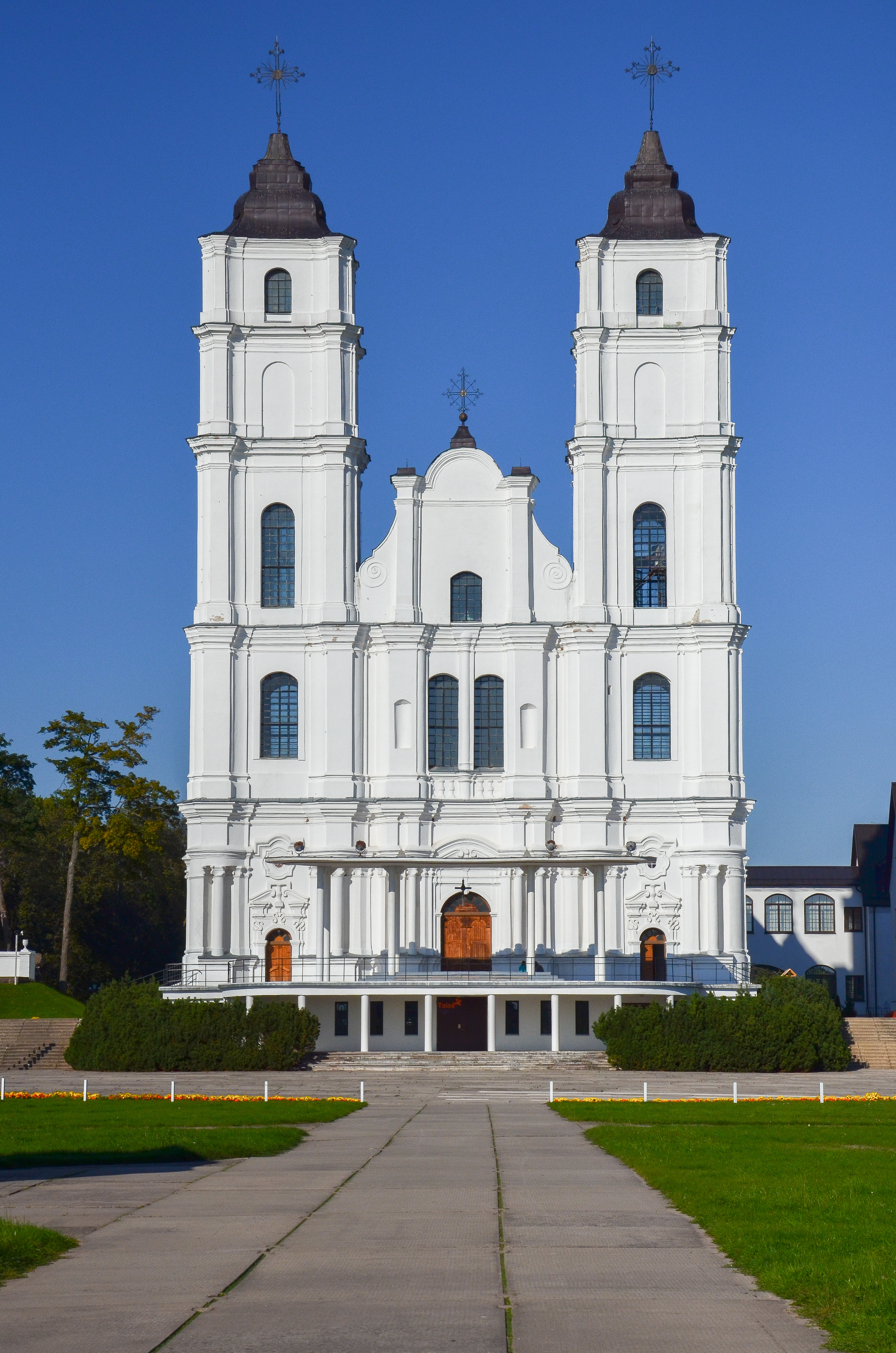
Basilica of the Assumption of Aglona

Due to the influence of the Polish–Lithuanian Commonwealth, the population of Latgale has remained predominantly Catholic (65.8% of the population in 2011), while Lutheranism has been more common in other regions of Latvia.

One of the most important Catholic spiritual centers in Latvia is located in Aglona. Built in 1780, Basilica of the Assumption of Aglona that is one of the eight international shrines recognized by the Holy See, historically has been a popular destination for the pilgrims. Thousands of pilgrims from Latvia and abroad visit Aglona every year on 15 August, to attend the feast day of the Assumption of the Blessed Virgin Mary. Aglona has been twice visited by a Roman pontiff. Pope John Paul II visited Aglona in 1993 and Pope Francis in 2018.

=== Latgalian pottery ===
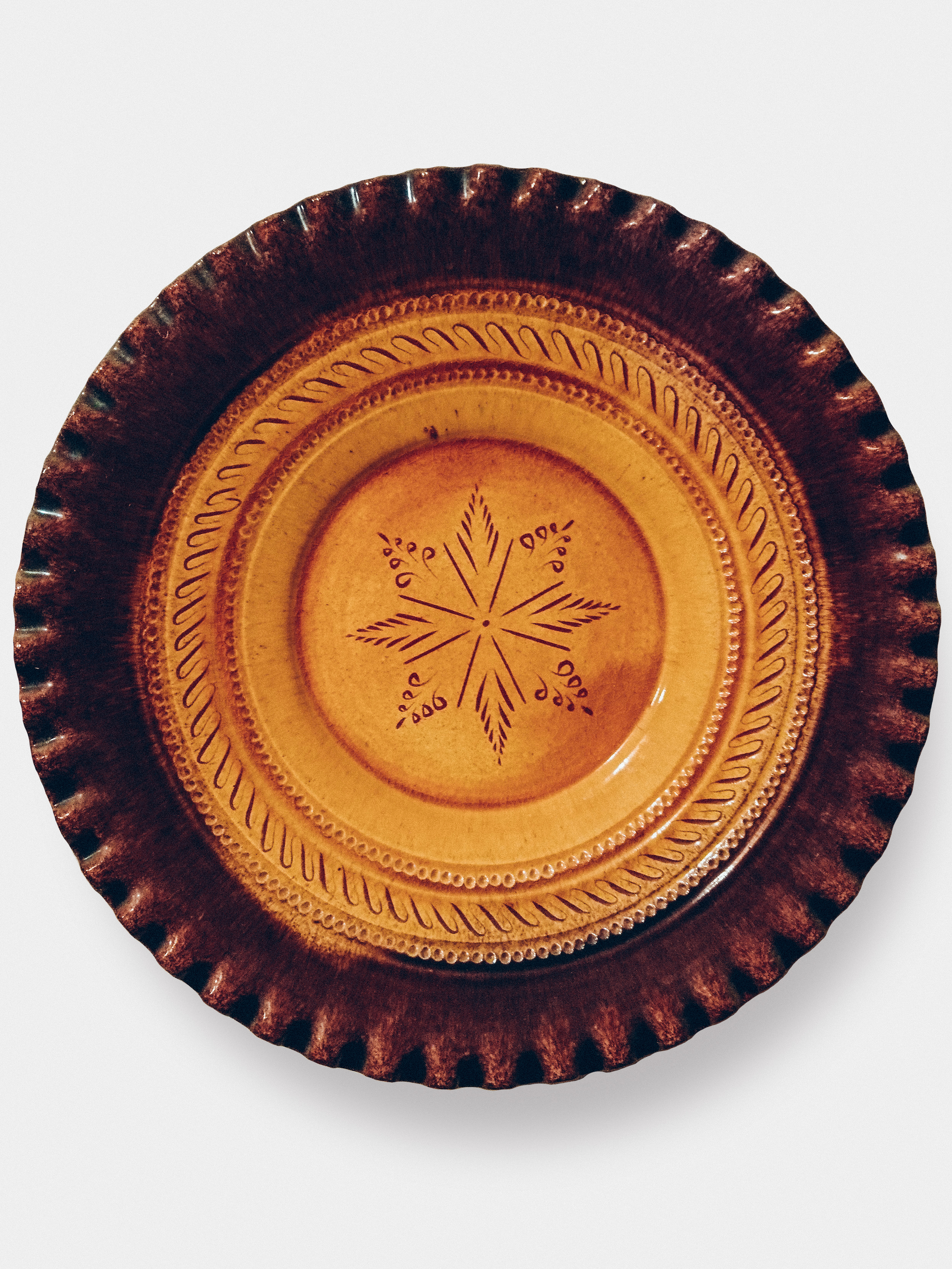
A decorative plate made by the Latgalian ceramicist Polikarps Čerņavskis

The region of Latgale historically has been the most prolific producer of ceramic wares. Archeological investigations have shown that Latgalians were well acquitted with the pottery craft in the period of early medieval state of Jersika. Most of the types of wares of Latgalian ceramics, such as vuoraunīks (a pot for cooking), madaunīks (a pot for honey storage), sloinīks (a pot for storing fruit preserves), stuodiņs (a pot for storing sour cream), ļaks (a vessel for storage of oil), pīna pūds (a pot for storing cow's milk), kazeļnīks (a pot for goat milk storage), puorūss (lit. "over-handle", a vessel for bringing food to the field), bļūda (bowl) and kryuze, were used in the local households for everyday use for several centuries.

In 20th century, Latgalian ceramicists started to create decorative wares, such as candlesticks and decorative plates. Latgalian ceramics rose to the international prominence, when Andrejs Paulāns and Polikarps Vilcāns works were awarded with a Gold Medal at the 1937 Paris Exhibition. In early Soviet period, Latgalian ceramicists struggled because of high taxes and being forced to join the kolkhoz's. Since 50's, ceramicists became more respected thanks to the enthusiasm of Gaigalava-born art historian Jānis Pujāts, who organized exhibitions in Latvia and outside its borders that showcased the works of several Latgalian ceramicists. In 1958, Andrejs Paulāns and Polikarps Vilcāns became first Latgalian ceramicists to be recognized as the People's Artists of the Latvian SSR.

Ceramics remains one of the trademarks of Latgale and has a great legacy in the region. Established in 1976, Latgale Ceramics Studio in Rēzekne was renamed to Andrejs Paulāns Folk Applied Art Studio in 1986. One of the streets in the Latgalian town of Preiļi is named in honor of him. In Rainis Museum in Jasmuiža are located the relocated workshop and kiln of Andrejs Paulāns, and a unique tile stove made by ceramicist Ādams Kāpostiņš. In Preiļi there is a house museum, dedicated to the Order of the Three Stars recipient - ceramicist Polikarps Čerņavskis.

In 2020, the Bank of Latvia issued a commemorative Latgalian Ceramics 2 euro coin that features a candelabra on it.

== Notable people ==
Famous people who have been born or lived in present-day Latgale:

- Ceramicists: Andrejs Paulāns, Polikarps Vilcāns, Ādams Kāpostiņš
- Painters: Staņislavs Kreics, Jāzeps Pīgoznis, Mark Rothko
- Film directors: Jānis Streičs, Rolands Kalniņš
- Classical musicians: Jānis Ivanovs, Iveta Apkalna, Nikolai Zaremba
- Writers: Yury Tynyanov, Jānis Pujāts, Władysław Studnicki
- Opera singers: Kristine Opolais
- Bishops: Jānis Bulis, Jānis Pujats, Julijans Vaivods, Antonijs Springovičs
- Politicians: Francis Trasuns, Yakov Pliner, Ilze Viņķele, Jānis Tutins
- Football players: Artjoms Rudņevs, Edgars Gauračs, Aleksandrs Isakovs, Vladislavs Kozlovs, Aleksandrs Cauņa, Vadims Logins, Ivans Lukjanovs, Māris Smirnovs, Mihails Ziziļevs, Antonijs Černomordijs, Jurģis Pučinskis

== See also ==
- Latgalians (modern)
- Latgalians (ancient)
- Latgalian language
- Latgalian pottery
