= Andreas Weiland =

German poet (born 1944)

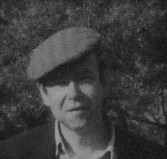
Andreas Weiland is a contemporary bi-lingual poet and essayist.

Andreas Weiland (born October 14, 1944) is a bilingual poet who writes in English and German. His poetry has been praised by fellow poets. Jürgen Theobaldy was the first poet and editor who published him.

Nicolas Born called him "a born lyrical poet". Erich Fried considered his poems important. Many artists and some filmmakers, (including Jean Marie-Straub, Dore O., and Werner Nekes) also praised his poetry. Weiland is also an art and film critic.

== Life and work ==
=== The early years ===
Weiland was born on October 14, 1944, north-western Germany. He studied American literature in Bochum, Germany.

In 1967 he founded the poetry magazine Touch with Steven R. Diamant. The journal is available in the Yale University Library. Massimo Bacigalupo called it una rivista d'avanguardia ("a journal of the avant-garde"). Since 1966, Weiland has translated poetry from Italian, modern Greek and Portuguese into English and German. He also translated and published the works of a number of "Angry Young Men", including Pete Brown, Libby Houston, Adrian Mitchell and Frances Horovitz. Weiland participated in a poetry reading with the British Beat poet Michael Horovitz in Bochum in the late 1960s.

In the 1970s, he wrote a poetic text inspired by the video film Herman Dances Alone. In 1975, his poem inspired by Straub-Huillet's film "Moses und Aron" was published in the journal Cahiers du Cinéma. This poem was translated from German to French by Jean-Marie Straub, and appeared in the Cahiers in both languages, accompanied by the commentary Il comble à peu tous mes espoirs quant au film ("It encompasses nearly all my hopes with regard to the film").

=== Years in Taiwan ===
During the second half of the 1970s, Weiland worked for several years as a lecturer in the German and English departments of a university in Taiwan. In Taiwan, he founded a journal called Street (Jie Tou, 街頭). During this period, there were many street protests against the Kuomintang (KMT) dictatorship. When Weiland published the work of two writers who had previously been imprisoned by the KMT, the government closed down the journal.

According to Weiland's "List of Publications," he also published articles in Chinese magazines, including Yinxiang and Artist Magazine. Two articles published in Artist Magazine were later republished in a small book, Day for Night in Taipei, Notes of A Cinéaste. An article by him originally published in Yinxiang about a film by the Indonesian film director Wim Umboh was republished in Art in Society. The journal mentions that Weiland interviewed Wim Umboh in Taipei when Umboh's film Plastic Flowers, which was scheduled to be screened during the Taipei International Film Festival of 1978, was outlawed by the KMT regime. Weiland attended a private screening of the forbidden film. Weiland wrote and published articles about art and cinema in Taiwan; his "List of Publications" also mentions a number of articles he wrote in those years about performances of the Cloud Gate Dance Theater.

=== The 1980s and '90s ===
Starting in the early 1980s, Weiland worked as a planning historian at the Department of Planning Theory of RWTH Aachen University. As a planning historian, Weiland published a number of articles. An interdisciplinary article that crossed the boundary between urbanistics and discourse theory appeared in Jürgen Link's journal kultuRRevolution. This journal also published a number of his poems.

He continued to write poetry and to correspond with poets, among them Jürgen Theobaldy, Erich Fried and perhaps also John Wieners, with whom he was already in touch in 1973 and Cid Corman until Corman died).

When Weiland read his poetry, it was often in the context of art exhibitions, for example at the Villa Ichon cultural center in Bremen in 1986 in conjunction with Wilfried ("Willi") Seeba's exhibition. In Aachen, he read his poems in the Karmán Auditory during an event organized for him by Peter Klein of the renowned Buchhandlung Backhaus that also invited such poets as Volker Braun. And he read his poems in this university town when he was invited to do so during the exhibitions of artists such as Lui Rummler and Peter Lacroix.

Weiland also participated in the art projects and exhibitions of the Canadian painter and printmaker Angelo Evelyn during the 1980s. In addition to reading his poems during single exhibitions of Evelyn, he wrote the text for Evelyn's catalogue "Burning Cloud and Other Themes" when the artist had a big exhibition in the RhoK (Flemish art academy) in Brussels in 1987.

In 1987, Weiland participated in the feminist art project "Unter einem Himmel" ("Under one and the same sky") at the gallery of Schloss Borbeck, Essen, that was organized and curated by Doris Schöttler-Boll in 1986–1988. Here, he introduced the female Korean artist Eu-nim Ro to the public and read his poetry. Two years later, he participated in the project "Wo bleibst Du, Revolution?" ("Where are you waiting, Revolution?") at the Kunstmuseum Bochum, Germany.

With Fang Weigui, Weiland translated 155 poems that were written by the ancient Chinese poet Bai Juyi. The book, which was published in Göttingen in 1999, was positively reviewed by Karl-Heinz Pohl (sinologue, Trier University) and by Wolfgang Kubin (poet and sinologue, Bonn and Beijing).

=== 2000 onwards ===
Weiland read his poems frequently during diverse events organized by Doris Schöttler-Boll in the Atelierhaus (art house) in Essen Steele. He presented poems of his new poetry book "Die Tage, das Zeitalter" (The Days, the Age...) during the "Long Night of Poets" event on September 21, 2001, which also featured the poets Angelika Janz, Christina Schlegel, D.E. Sattler, Ina Kurz, Matthias Schamp and Urs Jaeggi.

When Hans van der Grinten, a friend of Joseph Beuys, invited Angelo Evelyn to do a big single exhibition in the museum of his hometown, Kranenburg, Weiland was invited to read his poetry. The new poems read during the event were inspired by works of Evelyn. They appeared in print in 2003.

Weiland also read recently written poetry in the context of a series of events curated by the artist Li Portenlänger. In one case, the result was a small poetry book with an original lithographic art work by Portenlänger.

Weiland participated in collective art and literature projects such as the project "Erfahren/Erinnern" (Figurenfeld Project, Eichstätt, Germany), together with Li Portenlänger, Luc Piron, and Angelo Evelyn, and in the big "Demer" project of Luc Piron that was exhibited in Diest, Belgium, in 2014.

Weiland's cooperation with Piron resulted in a number of artist books with Piron's art works and Weiland's poems. Weiland wrote also commentaries on the paintings of modern Arab artists like Maurice Haddad from Iraq and, while using a pseudonym, about the Egyptian painter Saad el Girgawi. In 2009, Weiland participated in a conference about the Contemporary Arab Contribution to World Culture at the UNESCO in Paris that was organized by the president of the IAIS. He gave talks on two Arab architects, Rasem Badran and Hassan Fathy.

In recent years, Weiland has started two multilingual online magazines. One of these is called Street Voice. For the sixth issue of this poetry journal, he has translated poetry from the Mongolian language.

He has been published since 1966 in a number of literary journals and his poems have also been translated into other languages. His poetry books can be found in the German National Library (Deutsche Nationalbibliothek) and the National Library of the Netherlands (Koninklijke Bibliotheek, Den Haag).

== Selected publications ==
- Gedichte aus einem dunklen Land, Rotterdam (Symposium Verlag) 1998
- Die Tage, das Zeitalter, Rotterdam [etc.] (Jietou Press) 1999, 2da edición 2001
- At Mad Mick's Place, Rotterdam (Symposium Press) 2000
- Das verwandte Land, Rotterdam (Symposium Press) 2000
- Midwestern vistas & other poems, Rotterdam (Symposium Press) 2001
- The Kranenburg Poems, Rotterdam (Symposium Press) 2003, 2da edición 2004
- Strange meeting you / Seltsame Begegnung, Rotterdam (Symposium Press) 2003
- Die Rosenberg-Barradini-Torres-Gedichte, Paris (Jietou) 2005
- The Blackness of Black: Poems in Memory of Nan Hoover, n.p. (Stonybrook Editions; Norderstadt (BoD), 2022. ISBN 978-3-7562-4757-8; ISBN 3-7562-4757-0
- An einem Tag voller Licht. Dortmund (Edition Offenes Feld) 2023
- Jade Mountain Poems / Jade Berg Gedichte: poems gedichte, Bellingham (Igneus Press) 2023. Listed in the catalogue of the German National Library: https://d-nb.info/1341371638
- A Poem for Travelers & Other Poems / Ein Gedicht fuer Reisende & andere Gedichte, Dortmund (Edition Offenes Feld) 2025
