= National poet =

Poet traditionally held to represent a certain national culture

Tomb of James Clarence Mangan, with legend describing him as "Ireland's national poet"

A national poet or national bard is a poet held by tradition and popular acclaim to represent the identity, beliefs and principles of a particular national culture. The national poet as culture hero is a long-standing symbol, to be distinguished from successive holders of a bureaucratically-appointed poet-laureate office. The idea and honoring of national poets emerged primarily during Romanticism, as a figure that helped consolidation of the nation states, as it provided validation of their ethno-linguistic groups.

Most national poets are historic figures, though a few contemporary writers working in relatively new or revived national literatures are also considered "national poets". Though not formally elected, national poets play a role in shaping a country's understanding of itself. Some nations may have more than one national poet; the idea of a single one is always a simplification. It has been argued that a national poet "must write poetry that closely identifies with the nation's cause – or is thought to do so", with an additional assumption being that "a national poet must write in a national language".

The following is a list of nations, with their associated national poets. It is not a list of sovereign states or countries, though many of the nations listed may also be such. The terms "nation" (as cultural concept), "country" (as geographical concept) and "state" (as political concept) are not synonyms.

== Africa ==
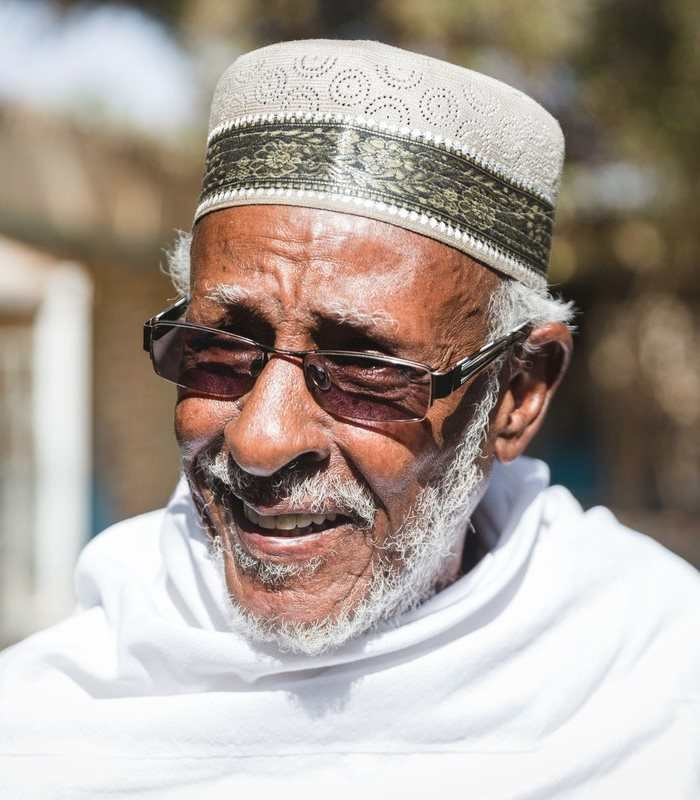
Hadrawi of Somalia

| Country or Territory | Poet | Ref. |
|---|---|---|
| Algeria | Si Mohand, Moufdi Zakaria | |
| Angola | Agostinho Neto | |
| Burkina Faso | Titinga Frédéric Pacéré | |
| Cape Verde | Jorge Barbosa | |
| Democratic Republic of Congo | Antoine-Roger Bolamba (J'ongungu) [when the country was known as Congo–Zaire] | |
| Djibouti | Victor Hugo M'Gonagall | |
| Egypt | Ahmed Shawqi | |
| Ethiopia | Gibreab Teferi, Tsegaye Gabre-Medhin | |
| Ghana | Atukwei Okai, Kofi Awoonor | |
| Kenya | Abdilatif Abdalla | |
| Lesotho | Thomas Mofolo | |
| Liberia | Melvin B. Tolson | |
| Libya | Ahmed Rafiq Almhadoui | |
| Madagascar | Jean-Joseph Rabearivelo | |
| Mali | Fily Dabo Sissoko | |
| Mauritius | Léoville L'Homme | |
| Morocco | Mohammed Awzal | |
| Mozambique | José Craveirinha | |
| Namibia | Mvula ya Nangolo | |
| Nigeria | Christopher Okigbo | |
| São Tomé and Príncipe | Francisco José Tenreiro, Alda Neves do Espírito Santo | |
| Senegal | Léopold Sédar Senghor | |
| Sierra Leone | Davidson Nicol | |
| Somalia | Hadrawi | |
| South Africa | S. E. K. Mqhayi | |
| Tanzania | Shaaban bin Robert | |
| Tunisia | Aboul-Qacem Echebbi | |
| Western Sahara | Zaim Allal | |

== Asia ==
| Country (or region) | Poet | Ref. |
|---|---|---|
| Afghanistan | Rumi, Khushal Khattak | |
| Bangladesh | Kazi Nazrul Islam | |
| China | Du Fu, Li Bai | |
| Cambodia | Preah Botumthera Som | |
| India | Rabindranath Tagore, Ramdhari Singh Dinkar, Kuvempu, Govinda Pai, G. S. Shivarudrappa, Maithili Sharan Gupt, Subramania Bharati, Kalidasa | |
| Indonesia | Chairil Anwar, Sapardi Djoko Damono | |
| Iran | Ferdowsi, Rumi, Hafez, Attar of Nishapur, Omar Khayyám, Saadi Shirazi, Nizami Ganjavi, Rudaki, Mohammad-Hossein Shahriar, Mohammad-Taqi Bahar, Mehdi Akhavan-Sales, Aref Qazvini, Ahmad Shamlou, Parvin E'tesami | |
| Iraq | Muthaffar al-Nawab, Al-Mutanabbi, Muhammad Mahdi al-Jawahiri | |
| Israel | Yehuda Amichai, Hayim Nahman Bialik, Natan Alterman | , |
| Japan | Matsuo Bashō, Lafcadio Hearn, Murasaki Shikibu, Tanikawa Shuntaro, Ishikawa Takuboku | |
| Jordan | Mustafa Wahbi al-Tal | |
| Kazakhstan | Abai Qunanbaiuli | |
| Korea | Cho Ki-chon, Yun Dongju, Han Yong-un, Park Mok-wol, Chŏng Ch'ŏl | |
| Kurdistan | Ehmedê Xanî, Cigerxwîn, Sherko Bekas, Hemin Mukriyani, Abdurrahman Sharafkandi | |
| Kyrgyzstan | Toktogul Satylganov | |
| Lebanon | Kahlil Gibran, Said Akl | |
| Malaysia | Usman Awang | |
| Mongolia | Ochirbatyn Dashbalbar, Dulduityn Danzanravjaa, Dashdorjiin Natsagdorj, Byambyn Rinchen, Hadaa Sendoo | |
| Myanmar | Min Thu Wun | |
| Nepal | Madhav Prasad Ghimire | |
| Pakistan | Allama Muhammad Iqbal | |
| Palestine | Mahmoud Darwish | |
| Philippines | Francisco Balagtas | |
| Sri Lanka | Parakrama Kodituwakku | |
| Syria | Nizar Qabbani | |
| Taiwan | Yang Mu, Yu Youren | |
| Tajikistan | Sadriddin Ayni, Bozor Sobir, Mirzo Tursunzoda Rudaki, Rumi, Gulnazar Keldi | |
| Thailand | Sunthorn Phu | |
| Tibet | Tsering Woeser | |
| Turkey | Rumi, Nâzım Hikmet, Ziya Gökalp, Mehmet Âkif Ersoy | |
| Turkmenistan | Magtymguly Pyragy | |
| Uzbekistan | Ali-Shir Nava'i, Abdulla Oripov, Erkin Vohidov, Gʻafur Gʻulom, Mirtemir | |
| Vietnam | Nguyễn Du, Nguyễn Đình Chiểu, Hồ Xuân Hương | |
| Yemen | Abdullah Al-Baradouni, Waddah al-Yaman | |

== Europe ==
| Country (or region) | Poet | Ref. |
|---|---|---|
| Albania | Gjergj Fishta, Naim Frashëri | |
| Abkhazia | Dmitry Gulia | |
| Armenia | Hovhannes Tumanyan, Sayat-Nova, Yeghishe Charents | |
| Austria | Franz Grillparzer, Johann Nepomuk Nestroy, Georg Trakl, Rainer Maria Rilke | |
| Azerbaijan | Nizami Ganjavi, Fuzûlî, Imadaddin Nasimi, Samad Vurgun | |
| Bashkortostan | Rami Garipov, Mustai Karim | |
| Basque Country | Bernard Etxepare | |
| Belarus | Yanka Kupala, Yakub Kolas | |
| Belgium | Emile Verhaeren, Maurice Maeterlinck | |
| Catalonia (Catalan Countries) | Ausiàs March, Jacint Verdaguer | |
| Chechnya | Abuzar Aydamirov | |
| Bosnia and Herzegovina | Abdulah Sidran, Mak Dizdar, Izet Sarajlić | |
| Brittany | Théodore Claude Henri, vicomte Hersart de la Villemarqué | |
| Bulgaria | Hristo Botev, Ivan Vazov | |
| Carpathian Ruthenia | Alexander Dukhnovych | |
| Croatia | Marko Marulić, Ivan Gundulić | |
| Cyprus | Vasilis Michaelides | |
| Czech Republic (Czech lands) | Karel Hynek Mácha, Jan Neruda | |
| Dagestan | Rasul Gamzatov, Suleyman Stalsky | |
| Denmark | Adam Oehlenschläger, Hans Christian Andersen, Søren Kierkegaard, N. F. S. Grundtvig | |
| Faroe Islands | William Heinesen, Nólsoyar Páll, Mikkjal á Ryggi | |
| England | Geoffrey Chaucer, William Shakespeare, William Blake, William Wordsworth, Thomas Hardy, W. H. Auden, Samuel Taylor Coleridge, Philip Larkin | |
| Estonia | Kristjan Jaak Peterson, Lydia Koidula | |
| Finland | Eino Leino, Johan Ludvig Runeberg | |
| Flanders | Émile Verhaeren, Hendrik Conscience, Guido Gezelle, Hugo Claus | |
| Friesland | Gysbert Japicx (or Japiks) | |
| France | Charles Baudelaire, Molière, Victor Hugo | |
| Galicia | Rosalía de Castro, Ramón Cabanillas | |
| Georgia | Shota Rustaveli | |
| Germany | Johann Wolfgang von Goethe, Friedrich von Schiller, Heinrich Heine, Bertolt Brecht, Friedrich Hölderlin, Novalis, Friedrich Nietzsche, Hermann Hesse, Stefan George | |
| Greece | Homer, Sappho, Pindar, Solon, Dionysios Solomos, Odysseus Elytis | |
| Guernsey | George Métivier | |
| Hungary | Sándor Petőfi, János Arany | |
| Iceland | Jónas Hallgrímsson, Hallgrímur Pétursson | |
| Ireland | Thomas Moore, William Butler Yeats, Seamus Heaney, Patrick Pearse | |
| Isle of Man | T. E. Brown | |
| Italy | Ovid, Virgil, Horace, Dante Alighieri, Francesco Petrarca, Giosuè Carducci, Giacomo Leopardi, Ugo Foscolo, Gabriele D'Annunzio | |
| Jersey | Wace | |
| Kosovo | Ali Podrimja | |
| Latvia | Rainis, Andrejs Pumpurs | |
| Lithuania | Kristijonas Donelaitis, Maironis, Justinas Marcinkevičius, Adomas Mickevičius | |
| Luxembourg | Edmond de la Fontaine, Michel Lentz | |
| Malta | Dun Karm Psaila | |
| Moldova | Grigore Vieru, Mihai Eminescu | |
| Monaco | Louis Notari | |
| Montenegro | Petar II Petrović-Njegoš | |
| Netherlands | Joost van den Vondel, Jacob Cats | |
| North Macedonia | Kočo Racin | |
| North Ossetia-Alania | Kosta Khetagurov | |
| Northern Cyprus | Özker Yaşın | |
| Norway | Henrik Wergeland | |
| Occitania | Frédéric Mistral, Arnaut Daniel, Bernart de Ventadorn, Comtessa de Dia | |
| Poland | Adam Mickiewicz, Juliusz Słowacki, Zygmunt Krasiński | |
| Portugal | Luís de Camões, Fernando Pessoa | |
| Provence | Frédéric Mistral, Comtessa de Dia | |
| Romania | Mihai Eminescu | |
| Russia | Alexander Pushkin, Anna Akhmatova, Boris Pasternak, Sergei Yesenin, Ivan Turgenev, Ivan Bunin | |
| Sápmi | Anders Fjellner | |
| Scotland | Robert Burns, Hugh MacDiarmid | |
| Serbia | Desanka Maksimović, Petar II Petrović-Njegoš, Jovan Sterija Popović, Jovan Jovanović Zmaj | |
| Slovakia | Pavol Országh Hviezdoslav | |
| Slovenia | France Prešeren | |
| Spain | Miguel de Cervantes, Lope de Vega, Federico García Lorca | |
| Styria | Peter Rosegger | |
| Sweden | Carl Michael Bellman, Gustaf Fröding, Verner von Heidenstam, Esaias Tegnér | |
| Switzerland | Gottfried Keller, Carl Spitteler | |
| Tatarstan | Ğabdulla Tuqay, Musa Cälil, Ravil Fayzullin, Fänis Yarullin | |
| Turkey | Yunus Emre, Mehmet Akif Ersoy, Nâzım Hikmet | |
| Ukraine | Lesya Ukrainka, Taras Shevchenko, Ivan Franko | |
| Wales | Dylan Thomas, Dafydd ap Gwilym | |

== North America ==
| Country or Territory | Poets | Ref. |
|---|---|---|
| Barbados | Kamau Brathwaite | |
| Canada | Margaret Atwood, E. Pauline Johnson, E. J. Pratt, Al Purdy, Milton Acorn | |
| Costa Rica | Aquileo J. Echeverría, Jorge Debravo | |
| Cuba | José Martí, Lezama Lima, Agustín Acosta (1955), Nicolás Guillén (1961), Nancy Morejón (2018) | |
| Curaçao | Pierre Lauffer | |
| Dominican Republic | Pedro Mir | |
| El Salvador | Roque Dalton | |
| Greenland | Henning Jakob Henrik Lund | |
| Guadeloupe | Guy Tirolien | |
| Guatemala | Rafael Landívar | |
| Haiti | Oswald Durand | |
| Honduras | Roberto Sosa | |
| Jamaica | Claude McKay | |
| Martinique | Aimé Césaire | |
| Mexico | Octavio Paz, Ramón López Velarde, Sor Juana Inés de la Cruz | |
| Nicaragua | Rubén Darío | |
| Panama | Ricardo Miró | |
| Puerto Rico | Julia de Burgos, Giannina Braschi, Juan Antonio Corretjer, Lola Rodríguez de Tió, Nimia Vicéns | |
| Quebec | Émile Nelligan, Gaston Miron, Gilles Vigneault, Octave Crémazie | |
| Saint Lucia | Derek Walcott | |
| Sint Maarten | Lasana M. Sekou | |
| Trinidad and Tobago | E. M. Roach | |
| United States | Walt Whitman, Emily Dickinson, Robert Frost, William Carlos Williams, Ralph Waldo Emerson, Carl Sandburg, Maya Angelou, Gwendolyn Brooks, Langston Hughes, Jack Kerouac, James Wright, Allen Ginsberg | |

== Oceania ==
| Country | Poets | Ref. |
| Australia | Dorothea Mackellar, Mary Gilmore, Judith Wright, Henry Lawson, Adam Lindsay Gordon, A. B. "Banjo" Paterson, C.J. Dennis | |
| New Zealand | James K. Baxter, Thomas Bracken, Allen Curnow | |
| Tonga | Konai Helu Thaman | |

== South America ==
| Country | Poets | Ref. |
|---|---|---|
| Argentina | José Hernández | |
| Bolivia | Rosendo Villalobos | |
| Brazil | Gonçalves Dias, Olavo Bilac, Carlos Drummond de Andrade, Machado de Assis | |
| Chile | Pablo Neruda, Gabriela Mistral | |
| Colombia | Rafael Pombo, José Asunción Silva, Álvaro Mutis | |
| Ecuador | José Joaquín de Olmedo, Remigio Crespo Toral | |
| Guyana | Martin Carter | |
| Peru | César Vallejo | |
| Suriname | Trefossa | |
| Uruguay | Juan Zorrilla de San Martín | |
| Venezuela | Andrés Eloy Blanco | |

== See also ==
- Poet laureate
