= The cemetery of Bai Juyi =

Tomb in Henan, China

Coordinates: 34.557222°N 112.481667°E

The cemetery of Bai Juyi (also Bo Juyi or Po Chü-i; Chinese: 白居易; 772–846), is called “Bai Yuan”. It is the tomb of Bai Juyi, which is located on the Pipa peak of Longmen East Mountain in the south of Luoyang. It covers an area of 44 acre. It is a cultural and natural scenic spot in Longmen. It is located in the forest in the mountains. and has the charm of immortality. It is the only theme park commemorating Bai Juyi in China.

Bai Juyi lived in Luoyang for 18 years in his later years. Although he was respected as a "Shao Fu", but he was poor throughout his life time and liked alcohol so much and poetry of course. He built Xiangshan temple and opened Bajie beach in Longmen. He was very attached to Longmen landscape and was buried here as instructed after his death.

- Many delegations from Japan, South Korea, Singapore and other countries and China's Hong Kong, Macao and Taiwan have come to Baiyuan to commemorate, search for roots and worship ancestors.
- In 1988, the Japanese Association for the promotion of Chinese culture set up a monument written in both Chinese and Japanese.
- In 1995, Japan presented cherry blossoms and erected a monument in Baiyuan.
- In 1999, South Korea and Singapore erected monuments here in 2000.
