= Yinxiang =

Yinxiang may refer to:

- Yinxiang, Prince Yi (胤祥; 1686 — 1730), a prince of the Qing dynasty
- Yinxiang (magazine), a 1971–1998 Taiwanese film journal
- Yinxiang Group, an industrial company based in Chongqing, China, specializing in real estate and research, development, manufacturing and sales of motorcycles, passenger vehicles, gasoline engines and general-purpose engines and equipment.
- Yinxiang Motorcycle (银翔摩托), mainland Chinese company based in Chongqing
- Yinxiang (town) (殷巷镇), town in Shanghe County, Shandong, China
