= Haku Rakuten =

Noh play in the first category by Zeami Motokiyo

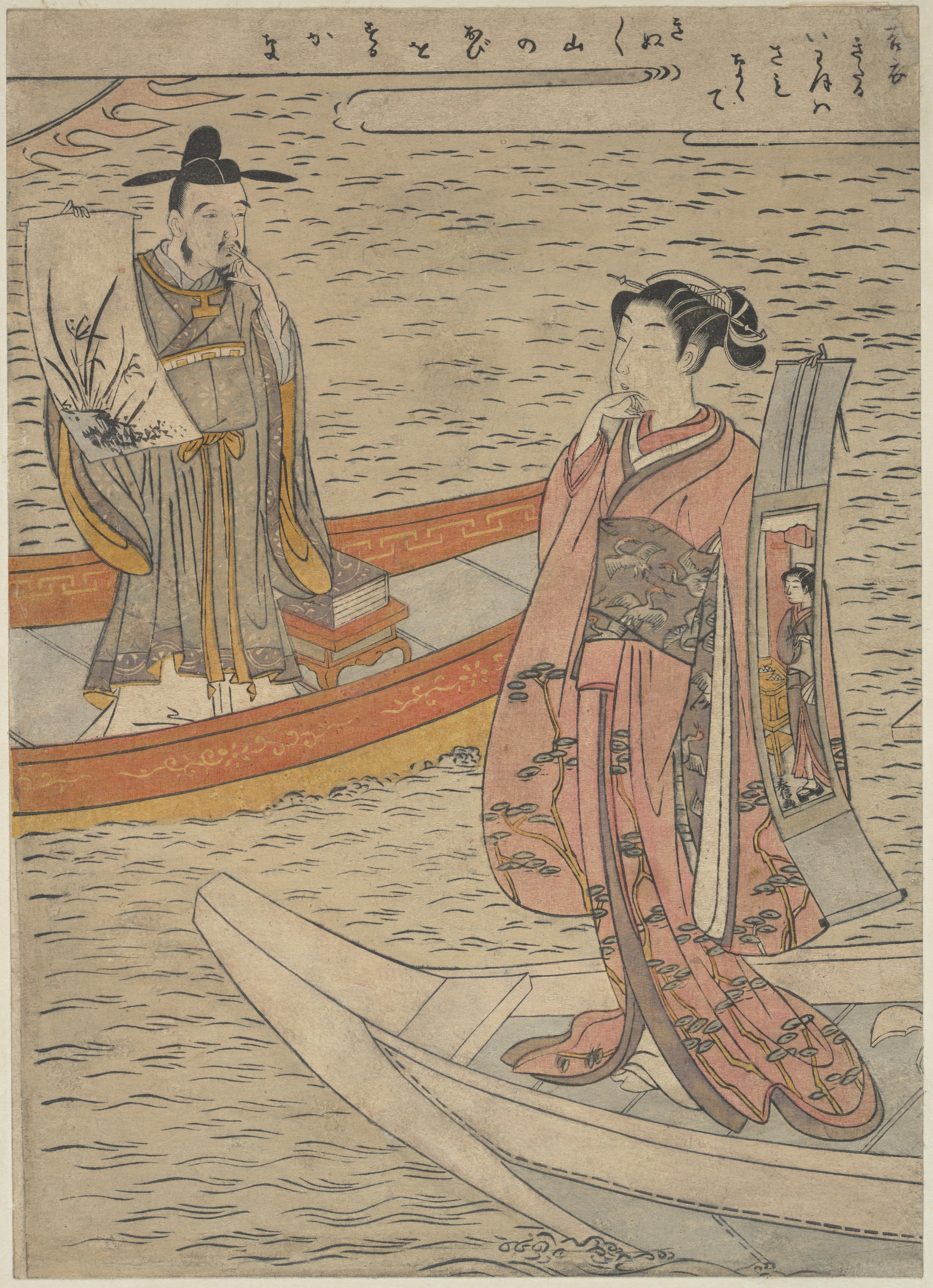
Parody of the Noh play Haku Rakuten; woodblock print by Suzuki Harunobu, c. 1766. In the cultural contest between Japan and the continent, Bai Juyi is substituted with a Korean ambassador, holding an ink wash painting in the traditional style. and Sumiyoshi Myōjin with the winning charms of a modish Japanese bijin, holding a bijin-ga painting in the radical ukiyo-e style.

Haku Rakuten (白楽天) is a Noh play in the first category by Zeami Motokiyo, about the Japanese god of poetry repelling the Chinese poet Bai Juyi (or Po Chü-i) from Japan 500 years earlier, in defiance of the (perceived) challenge from China to the autonomy of Japanese poetry.

== Historical background ==
Although Bai never traveled to Japan, his influence there was significant in the 9th century. The leading Japanese poet Sugawara no Michizane was strongly influenced by Bai's work, to the extent that Arthur Waley described it as "an unparalleled example of literary prostration".

A comparable challenge to indigenous arts arising from the prestige of Chinese culture appeared in the 14th century, contributing to the theme of cultural resistance in Zeami's plays.

== Plot ==
The poet Bai is sent by the emperor of China to test the Japanese, and meets two fishermen on his arrival. The elder of the fishermen explains to him the nature of Japanese poetry, Yamato Uta, suggesting that it is something shared both by men and by the birds, insects, and frogs of the land. Gradually the fisherman is revealed to be Sumiyoshi no Kami, the Japanese god of poetry himself. He launches into a series of dances that summon a divine wind, blowing a defeated Bai back to China.

== Borrowings and reception ==
The opening Jo section sees the waki (Haku Rakuten) and waki-tsure sing of the lands of the rising sun and of the setting sun, seemingly a reference to Shōtoku Taishi's famous letter sent by Empress Suiko to Emperor Yang of Sui. In the ensuing Ha section, the shite (an old fisherman) acknowledges the status of Chinese poetic shi and fu, together with that of the Buddhist scriptures from India, but suggests that rather than servile imitation the Japanese poetic tradition "blends", develops, and transcends its inheritance; his proposition, as above, that the birds and the beasts share in the creation of Japanese poetry and song, draws on Ki no Tsurayuki's preface to the Kokinshū.

In turn, the noh play has inspired works including folding screens by Ogata Kōrin, and woodblock prints by Suzuki Harunobu and Kōgyo Tsukioka.

== See also ==
- Kanshi (poetry)

== Related images ==
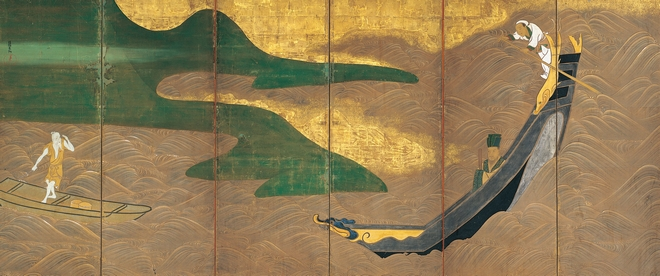
Haku Rakuten byōbu by Ogata Kōrin (Nezu Museum)

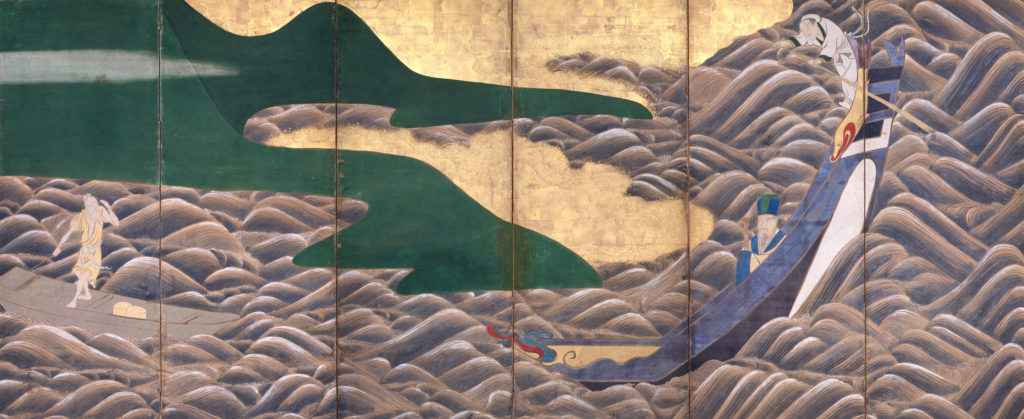
Haku Rakuten byōbu by Ogata Kōrin (private collection)

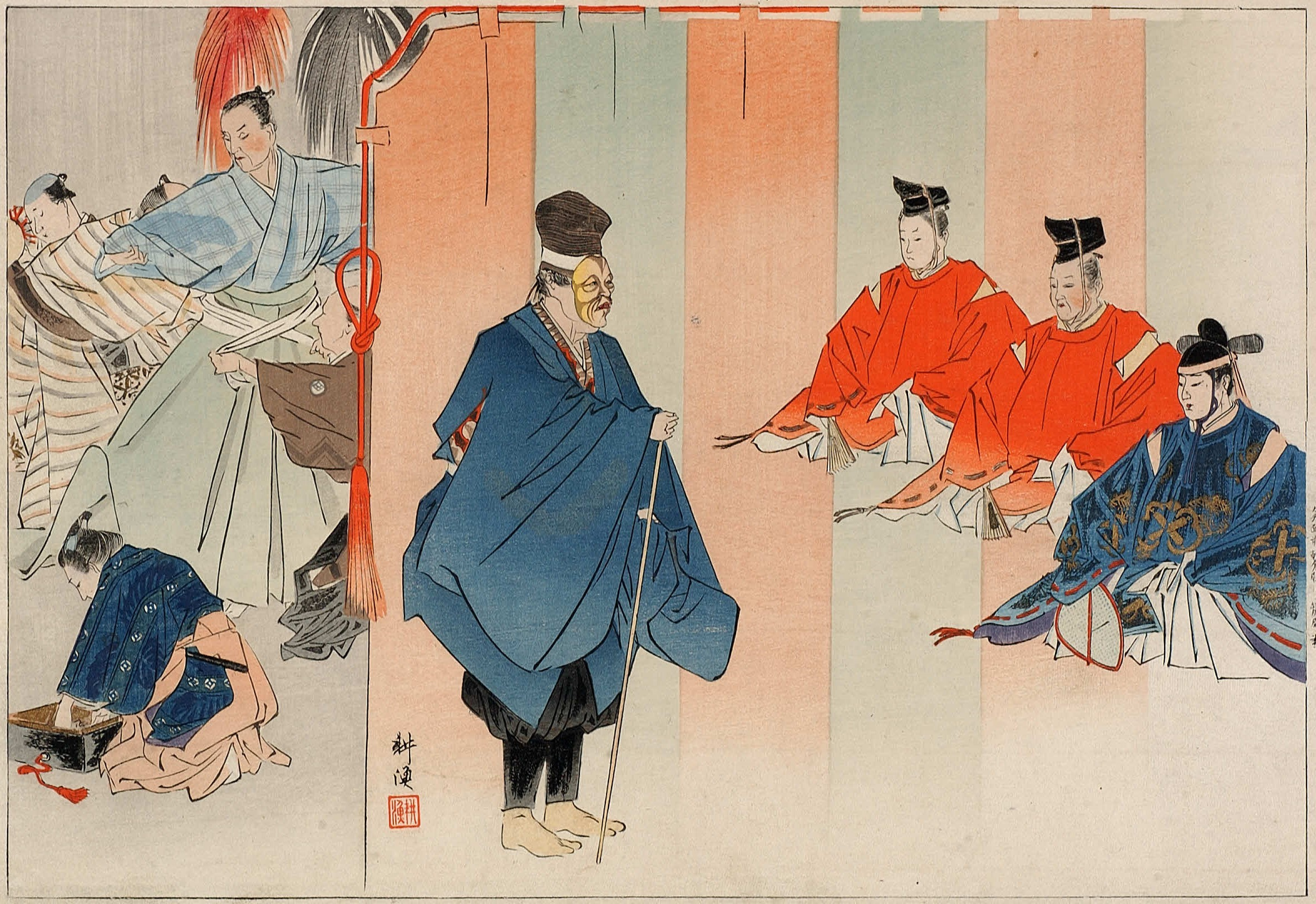
Scene from Haku Rakuten, from the series Pictures of Noh Plays by Kōgyo Tsukioka

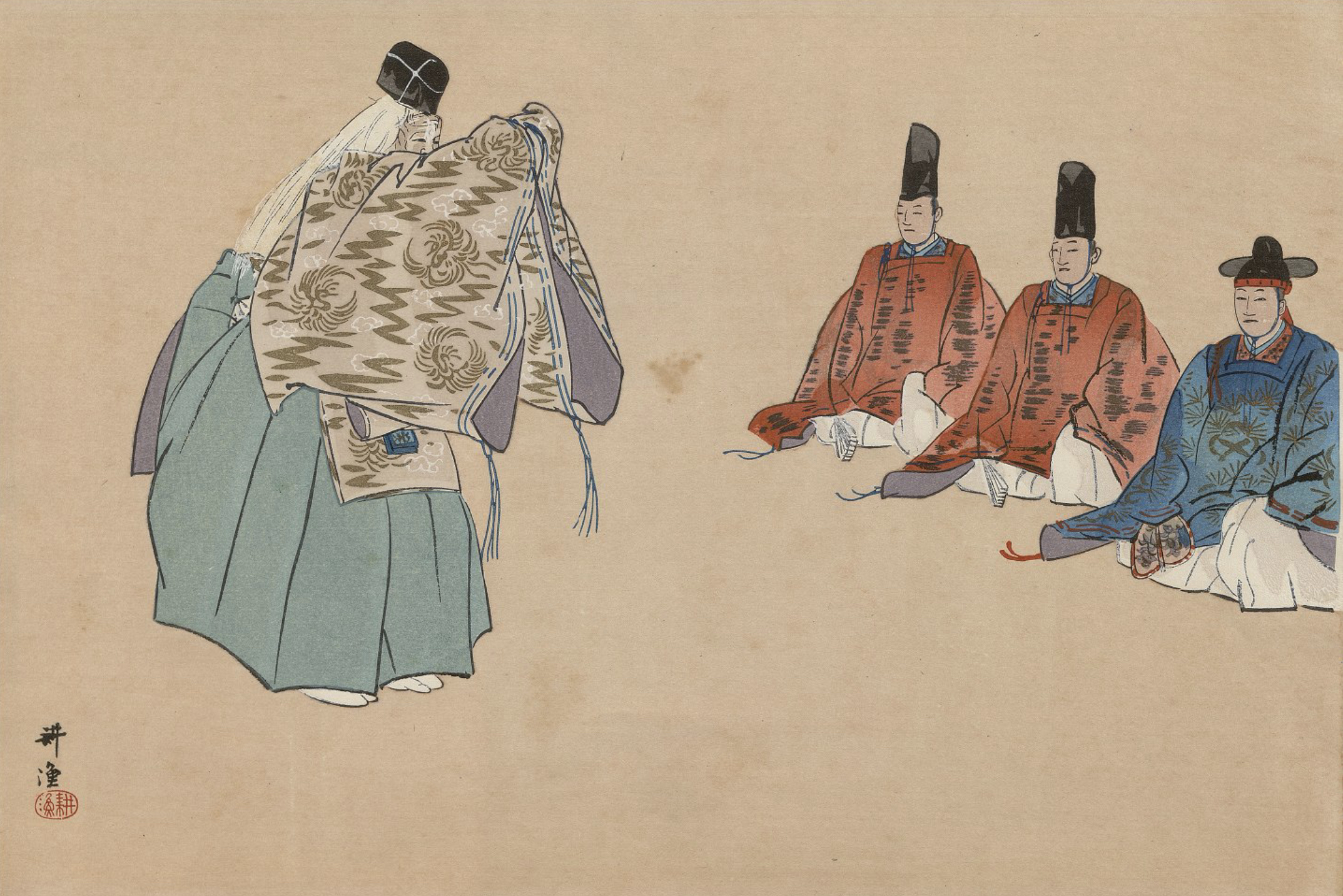
Sumiyoshi Myōjin dances before Haku Rakuten and his two attendants, from Nōga taikan by Kōgyo Tsukioka
