= Hadaa Sendoo =

Mongolian poet and translator (born 1961)

- Born: 24 October 1961 (age 64); Southern Mongolian, today's Inner Mongolia in the territory of China
- Occupations: Poet, critic, essayist, translator
- Writing career
- Period: 24 September 2011 – present
- Literary movement: Early 21st century, Medellin, the World Poetry Movement (WPM)

Hadaa Sendoo (Mongolian: Сэндоогийн Хадаа; born 24 October 1961) is a Mongolian poet whose works have been translated into multiple languages and appeared in international anthologies and literary journals. In 2006, he founded the World Poetry Almanac.

Sendoo was elected a full member of the Mongolian Academy of Humanities and received an Achievement Award in 2010 in the USA. His most recent publication in Mongolian is The Road Is Not Completed, released in Ulaanbaatar in 2011. He has been nominated for the 2012 International Peace Award.

== Roots ==
Hadaa Sendoo was born in 1961 in Southern Mongolia, today's Inner Mongolia (now part of China), and grew up in Shiliingol. His father was the head of a theatre, and his mother was a drama actor. Sendoo has lived in Ulan Bator, the capital of Mongolia, since 1991.

== Early years ==
When Hadaa Sendoo was very young, his father moved his family to southern Mongolia, near the Dalan Har Mountains, where Hadaa spent his childhood. He studied old Mongolian and Chinese at the local high school but, tiring of the school curriculum, he returned to a nomadic life on the steppe. He remained on the steppe until 1984, when his father recommended that he should enter an art institute. He did so and soon served there as an editorial assistant.

The young Hadaa had the opportunity to read a lot of Mongolian literature - certainly the classics, and thus epics, including the Jangar, Books of Mongolian Folk Songs, and also Modernist Poetry (Shuleg).

In 1989, he published his first collection of poems The Nomadic Songs and Moonlight.

In 1991, he moved to Northern Mongolia and ever since has lived in Ulaanbaatar, the capital of Mongolia, where he teaches at the university as a professor of literature. His research has included Mongolian folk literature, including folk songs, and Mongolian mythology.

In 1996, Hadaa Sendoo published his first collection of poems written in Cyrillic new Mongolian. In 1998, he joined the Mongolian Writers Union. In 1999, Hadaa and his friends co-founded a cultural magazine called The World's Mongolians (a Mongolian - English bilingual edition) published in Mongolia. In the summer of the same year, Hadaa and his friend, Mongolian poet S. Tserendorj, organized the first Asian Poetry Festival in Ulaanbaatar.

Hadaa won the Athens City Hall Prize and the 2nd Olympics of Culture Prize (Athens, 1999).

He has taught at the National University of Mongolia.

== On the way to poetry ==
In his middle age, Hadaa Sendoo wrote many poems.

In 2000, in the first new millennium of the 21st century, Hadaa Sendoo was awarded the Poet of the Millennium Award, jointly awarded by Krishna Srinivas, President of the World Poetry Society, and the International Academy of Poets, India.

Hadaa founded the World Poetry Almanac in 2006.

On 24 September 2011, Hadaa joined the World Poetry Movement and thus becoming in of its early founder members.

In 2012, he was invited to the largest poetry festival ever staged in the UK, the Southbank Centre's Poetry Parnassus, where he read his poetry and discussed his work as part of the festival. His latest collection of poems was displayed as part of the exhibition in the outdoor spaces around the Royal Festival Hall and the Queen Elizabeth Hall. One of his poems was printed on bookmarks for the "Rain of Poems", and thus was among the poems dropped from a helicopter over London.

His poems have appeared in the World Record Anthology by Bloodaxe. And also in an anthology of present-day Best Poems of 60 representative poets around the globe.

In 2020, Hadaa Sendoo's collection of poems হাদা সেন্দো'র করিতা (in Bengali) was published in Dhaka, Bangladesh. And a translation (in Arabic)أنا... لا أحتاج جنازة /I Don't Need a Funeral, E-Book has appeared on Amazon Books. Some of his early poems (Long poem), written in the 1980s, were also published in Germany. In 2022, his collection of poems with German " Der Wind" was published by Marburg Book, in Germany. In 2023, he published his musings with poetic works in Mongolian.

His poems, translated into more than 40 languages, have been included in The Best Mongolian Poetry collection.

Hadaa Sendoo is currently a consulting editor of the International Literary Quarterly.

== Poets talking about poetry of Hadaa Sendoo ==
Cambridge University Professor and Poet Richard Berengarten wrote about one of Hadaa Sendoo's works: "I have read this book through carefully. More important, I was delighted to discover the depth and breadth of his great vision. This impression of mine was strengthened when I read the last prose text on the "Poet of the 21st century" in the book Come Back to Earth, and his poem "The Wind". Both these texts connect with my concept of the "universalist poet" and "universalist poetry". The theme of the wind (air, breath, spirit) is very profound. The poems in Come Back to Earth gave me a sense of the wide spaces of Mongolia and also made me sad for the culture that has been lost. They reminded me of the fine movies The Cave of the Yellow Dog and Story of the Weeping Camel. "

Germany's writer Rainer Wedler said: "The poems of the Mongolian poet Hadaa Sendoo give an insight into a little-known area of literary geography."

Germany's Andreas Weiland, an art critic, said: "Hadaa Sendoo's poetry echoes his life, nature, the wide land, the wind of Mongolia. I try to listen to the rhythm. I pay attention to the poetic quality of each line. I think that lines in his poetry like "resigned to another death" or "glad to die another death" both refer to reincarnation. We die so many deaths, because we are reborn, according to Shamanist and Buddhist (and other) beliefs. His poems touch my heart and evoke thoughts and strong emotions, intense images. I hold Hadaa Sendoo in high regard as a sensitive and genuine poet".

== Influence exerted ==
Hadaa was invited to the influential International Poetry Festival of Medellin as a guest, and also to the 2011 Tokyo Poetry Festival. In 2012, he took part in the UK's largest ever poetry festival Poetry Parnassus.

In October 2006, then World Poetry Almanac was published in Central Asia, founded by Hadaa Sendoo. .

Hadaa Sendoo, has been recognized as аn accomplished Leader of influence (American Biographical Institute, 2010).

In 2016, Hadaa Sendoo published his collection of poems Sweet Smell of Grass (بوی شیرین چمن) in Persian. This collection of poems has been featured and discussed in the internationally renowned Tehran International Book Fair. And in 2017, Hadaa Sendoo's poetry book,"Wenn ich sterbe, werde ich träumen"(Bilingual Mongolian-German), has appeared in the Frankfurt Book Fair and poetry book,"Sich zuhause fühlen"(German version), has appeared in the Frankfurt Book Fair 2018, in Germany.

In 2017, Hadaa Sendoo received an award at the Festival DOOS-2017 for "The Manifesto of the five continents”, in Moscow, Russia.

In 2018, Hadaa Sendoo won a silver medal at the third Eurasian Literary Festival in Sochi. His poetry book, "Peace, broken heart" (in Russian) was added to the collection of the Pushkin Library in Sochi.

In 2019, Hadaa Sendoo was invited to the Vietnam International Poetry Festival, the International Writers Forum in Almaty, Kazakhstan, and the Eurasian Literary Festival in Baku, Azerbaijan, where he won the highest honor - the gold medal of the Silk Way Literary Festival.

== Awards ==
- The Poet of the Millennium Award (2000);
- World Poetry Prize for Distinguished Poet (2005);
- The Mongolian Writers Union Prize (2009);
- The Pinnacle of Achievement Award for poetry (2011);
- Visionary Poet Award (2015);
- Poetry prize of DOOS group (2017);
- The Highest Award of the Eurasian- All-Russian Literary Festival (2018);
- Matthew Arnold Award (2018);
- World Union of Writers Award (2019);
- World Icon of Peace Award (2019);
- Modern Literary Renaissance Award (2019);
- Silk Way prize (2019);
- Nosside World Poetry Prize (2019)

=== Works ===
- Poetry Books: The Nomadic Songs and Moonlight (Chinese 1989);
- Rock Song / Khaadyn duulal (Mongolian 1996);
- The Steppe / Tal (Mongolian 2005);
- Come Back to Earth (English 2009);
- Come Back to Earth (Hui gui da di, Chinese Translation 2010);
- Yurt (Georgian, 2010);
- The Road Is Not Completed / Uzuurgui zam (Mongolian, 2011)
- Sweet Smell of Grass (بوی شیرین چمن Persian, 2016)
- Aurora (Kurdish,2017)
- Mongolian Long Song (Georgian,2017)
- Wenn ich sterbe, werde ich träumen（bilingual Mongolian/German,2017）
- Mongolian Blue Spots / Mongoolse Blauwe Plekken (bilingual English/Dutch, 2018)
- A Corner of the Earth / Eit hjørne på jorda（bilingual English/Norwegian, 2018）
- Мир, разбитое сердце (Russian,2018)
- Sich zuhause fühlen(German,2018)
- Mongolischer blauer Fleck (German,2019)
- Hirtenlieder und Mondschein (early works and Long poem, Bilingual version, 2020)
- চাঁদের আলোয় যাযাবর গান (Bengali, 2020)
- Der Wind (German, Marburg Book 2022)
- Line of heaven /Tengeriin utas (Mongolian, 2023)
- The Love that Came to Me /Nadad Irsen Durlal (Mongolian, 2023)
