= Fang Weigui =

Chinese comparative literature scholar and sinologist

- 方维规
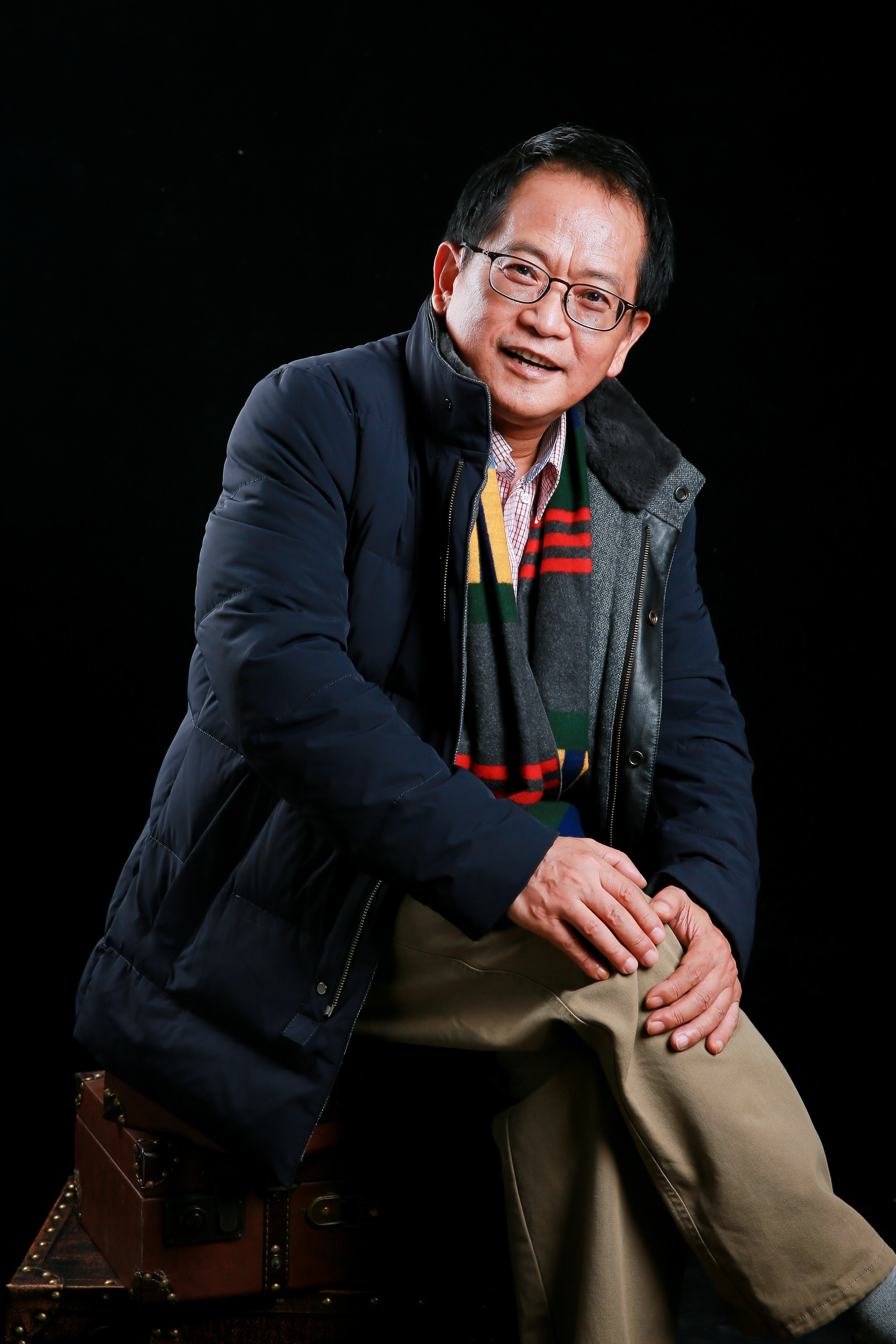
- Born: 1957 (age 68–69)

Academic background
- Education: Shanghai International Studies University; Humboldt University of Berlin; RWTH Aachen University (PhD); University of Erlangen–Nuremberg (habilitation)

Academic work
- Discipline: Literary scholar

Fang Weigui (Chinese: 方维规; pinyin: Fāng Wéiguī; born 1957 in Shanghai) is a Chinese comparative literature scholar, sinologist, and literary translator.

== Early years ==
Fang graduated from Shanghai International Studies University where he subsequently taught at the German Department before enrolling in a cooperative academic program of Beijing Foreign Studies University and Humboldt University of Berlin.

At the time he wrote a thesis on Bertolt Brecht and Lu Xun that was published by a West German publisher in 1991.

Subsequently, he obtained a Ph.D. in Comparative Literature from RWTH Aachen University. His doctoral dissertation on the image of China in German literature 1871–1933 was published 1992. This book was inspired by the theoretical work of the Aachen-based Belgian comparatist Hugo Dyserinck that was focused on what Dyserinck called "imagology". Dyserinck demanded critical research of mutually existing (ideological) auto-images and hetero-images current in "national literatures" like the French and the German that influenced each other.

== Career in Germany ==
Since 1992, Fang worked as research fellow at the University of Trier. While teaching courses on Chinese literature and being engaged in research at the university"s Institute of Chinese Studies, he also wrote a Post-doctoral thesis on Chinese literature of the post-May 4th or Republican period (1919–1949).

From 1996 to 2000, Fang was a senior research fellow at the Department of East Asian Studies of the University of Göttingen. He was engaged in research on "new knowledge" in Late Qing China. Professor Michael Lackner advocated acceptance of Fang's post-doctoral thesis as a thesis of habilitation at the time.

In 2001, Fang was employed as a senior research fellow at the Department of Chinese Literature and simultaneously at the Department of Communication Theory of Trier University. He worked in a media-focused research project initiated by both departments.

In 2002, a slightly revised version of his post-doctoral thesis was accepted as his "Habilitationsschrift" by the University of Erlangen (Erlangen Umiversität, today the Erlangen campus of the University of Erlangen–Nuremberg). This work, entitled Selbstreflexion in der Zeit des Erwachens und des Widerstands – Moderne Chinesische Literatur 1919-1949 (Self-reflection in the Period of Awakening and Resistance – Modern Chinese Literature, 1919–1949), was published by the Harrasowitz publishing company as a volume of a well-reputed series (Lun Wen: Studien zur Geistesgeschichte und Literatur im China, Vol. 7) in 2006. The book was positively reviewed by Prof. Wolfgang Kubin. The book was also positively reviewed in the renowned scholarly journal Weimarer Beiträge.

Since 2002, subsequent to his habilitation (or professorial, postdoctoral qualification), Fang Weigui was an Associate Professor (Privatdozent) lecturing at the Department of Middle Eastern and Far Eastern Languages and Cultures of Erlangen University (Universität Erlangen).

As a Privatdozent, and simultaneously, until 2006, a senior research fellow, Fang was not only permanently engaged in research while also teaching courses at the Dept. of Chinese Literature. As noted already, he was likewise very active at the Department of Communication Theory in Trier. This work led to Fang's book Das Internet und China that was discussed in the Swiss daily Neue Zürcher Zeitung, mentioned by Der Spiegel, and reviewed in the Swiss journal Der Bund. Fang's book was also referred to by many other authors, for instance by Nele Noesselt.

== Career in China ==
When Fang returned to China in 2006, Professor Wolfgang Kubin saw "a good scholar" leaving the country (i.e., Germany) and regretted this very much.

Subsequent to his return to his native country in 2006, Fang soon became a professor at the School of Chinese Language and Literature of Beijing Normal University, and a researcher at the Center for Literary and Art Studies. Since 2012, he has been a Chiangjiang Scholar and Distinguished Professor.

His main research focus is on comparative poetics, comparative literature, history of concepts, sociology of literature, and Chinese literature written abroad.

Among the books written or edited by Fang since 2006, it is necessary to mention Wenxue Shehuixue Xinbian, a new compilation of texts concerning approaches to the sociology of literature, edited and commented by him, and published by Beijing Normal University Press. When this book appeared in print in 2011, it was discussed in the journal China Reading Weekly (Chine lecture hebdomadaire). The Chinese Social Science Journal (中国社会科学报 Zhongguo shehui kexue bao / Journal des sciences sociales chinoises) published an interview with Fang, conducted by two well-known scholars, Ming Haiying and Sun Miaoning, that focused on this book.

Another book by Fang that he wrote in German was published in Germany in 2013. It is entitled Der Westen und das Reich der Mitte – Die Verbreitung westlichen Wissens im spätkaiserlichen China (The West and the Middle Kingdom: the spread of Western knowledge in Late imperial China.). When this book appeared,. Mechthild Leutner commented in her article that was published in Monumenta Serica : "With this volume, Fang Weigui makes an important contribution" to scientific research focused on "cultural exchange and exchange of knowledge between China and Europe.". Wolfgang Kubin valued the book as "a volume of brilliant essays." He also called Fang "a master [in German: Meister] of conceptual history." "The strength of the author is [...] that he can think beyond the Chinese space.".

In China, the journalist Guo Enqiang published an article in the Chinese Social Science Journal that referred explicitly to the ideas and hypotheses regarding the history of concepts that were expressed by Fang in the book reviewed by Leutner and Kubin.

In addition to the books he wrote or edited and his scholarly articles, Fang also organized several international scholarly conferences at Beijing Normal University (BNU) in recent years under the general heading "Ideas and methods" (Sixiang yu fangfa); thus for instance a conference focused on the dialogue between the East and the West that was announced under the heading: Sixiang yu Fangfa: Quanqiuhua Shidai Zhongxi Duihua de Keneng / Idées et méthodes: Possibilités d'un dialogue sino-occidental à l'ère de la mondialisation (Ideas and methods: Possibilities of a Chinese-Western Dialogue in the Era of Globalization). A book published under the same title that presents many contributions by participating scholars was edited by Fang and published by Peking University Press in 2014.

A year later, Fang organized a conference; "Sixiang yu Fangfa: Jindai Zhongguo de Wenhua Zhengzhi et Zhishi Jiangou" (Idées et méthodes: Politique culturelle et construction des connaissances modernes dans la Chine moderne ( Ideas and methods : Cultural politics and the construction of modern knowledge in modern China). The contributions of participants were published in a volume with the same title, edited by Fang and published in 2015 by Beijing University Press.

In 2015, a third conference was organized by Fangs focused on World Literature. This conference, named « Sixiang yu fangfa: Hewei shijie wenxue? / Idées et méthodes : Qu'est-ce que la littérature mondiale ? / Ideas and methods : What is World Literature ? » took place at Beijing Normal University on Oct. 16 and 17, 2015. Marián Gálik, Galin Tihanov, David Damrosch, Bernard Franco, Matthias Freise, Zhang Longxi, and others participated in the debate, contributing to a lively and inspiring debate. Their contributions were published in 2018 by Palgrave Macmillan in the book Tensions in World Literature : Between the Local and the Universal, edited and with a long introduction by Weigui Fang that reveals his dedication to an approach inspired by conceptual history as well as his universalist commitment to the dialogue between nations. In 2018, the contributions of the foreign and Chinese scholars discussing World Literature, world literatures, and global literature were also published by Peking University Press in Chinese, in addition to the English version published by Palgrave Macmillan.

Subsequent to the above-mentioned conference on world literature organized by Fang in 2015, two other conferences have been organized by him at BNU:

- Sixiang yu fangfa: Lishi Zhongguo de Nei yu Wai / Ideas and Methods: Changing Order, Interlaced Civilizations: Inside and Outside of the historical China. October 22–23, 2016.

and

- Sixiang yu fangfa: Meijie Zhexue, Renzhi Kexue yu Renwen Jingshen de Weilai / Ideas and Methods: Media Philosophy, Cognitive Science, and the Future of the Humanities. October 27–29, 2018.

In 2019, Palgrave Macmillan published Fang's book Modern Notions of Civilization and Culture in China. As Prof. Wang (Academia Sinica, Taipei) noted, Fang discusses in this book "the paradigm shift and conceptual changes surrounding the wenming concept in the intellectual history of modern China."

In addition to ten monographical studies (in German, English, and Chinese), Weigui Fang has also edited eight books. He is the translator of four books (from German to Chinese, and from Chinese to German) and he has also published more than one hundred scholarly articles.

The Swiss newspaper Neue Zürcher Zeitung (NZZ) and the German weekly news magazine Der Spiegel referred to Fang as a literary theorist, while the Chinese daily Renmin Ribao (人民日報) introduced him to its readers as a scholar, a translator of German literature, and a "distinguished professor" at Beijing Normal University, who specializes in literary theory and the history of concepts.

The well-known sinologist Wolfgang Kubin praised Fang on several occasions. Thus he called him a "highly talented sinologist" when he reviewed Fang's translation of 155 poems by the Classical Chinese poet Bai Juyi).

The German sinologist Karl-Heinz Pohl, professor emeritus of the University of Trier, also praised Fang on several occasions. In his preface to the book Den Kranich fragen (Asking the Crane, 155 poems of Bai Juyi), he applauds Fang's "superior art of translation" And recently, Pohl declared that Fang "is now one of the most renowned scholars in China.".

As Prof. Pohl notes, Fang is a not only a "Distinguished Professor" at the School of Chinese Language and Literature of Beijing Normal University in China but also Changjiang Scholar of the Ministry of Education of China. He is simultaneously the Director of the Center for Literature and the History of Ideas at BNU.

Fang is widely recognized as one of the most significant experts focused on the history of ideas in China. He is not only known as a specialist in this field in China but also abroad. The journal Archiv Orientální / Revue trimestrielle des études africaines et asiatiques (vol. 71, no. 1, February 2003, p. 209. ISSN 0044-8699), published by the Oriental Institute of the Czech Academy of Sciences praised his article "Yi, yang, xi, wai and other terms: The Transition from Barbarian to Foreigner in Late Imperial China" by stating : "This study is an excellent example of the role of lexicology" if it is practiced with "such competence."

It is obvious that Fang's interest in the history of concepts has been alive for many years already. In fact, "Fang became one of the first scholars in China to focus on the history of concepts when his research essay on changing notions of civilization and culture in modern China was published in 1999," as Prof. Fansen Wang, vice-president of the Academia Sinica in Taipei, recently noted. Fang's research on the evolution (or changing history) of the image of China in German literature found wide reception among colleagues in East Asia and in the West.

== Selected works ==
=== Monographs ===
- "Shenme Shi Gainianshi? (Was ist Begriffsgeschichte? / What Is 'History of Concept'? / Qu'est-ce que l'histoire conceptuelle?), Beijing: SDX Joint Publishing Company, 2020.
- Modern Notions of Civilization and Culture in China (transl. to English by Weidong Wang). Published as part of the series Key Concepts in Chinese Thought and Culture. London; New York; Singapore : Palgrave Macmillan, 2019.
- Gainian de Lishi Fenliang: Jindai Zhongguo Sixiang de Gainianshi Yanjiu 概念的历史分量：近代中国思想的概念史研究 (The Significance of Concepts: Historical-Conceptual Investigation of Modern Chinese Thought / L'importance des concepts: enquête historique-conceptuelle sur la pensée chinoise moderne), Beijing: Peking University Press, 2018, 8+445 p.
- Wenxue Huayu yu Lishi Yishi [Literary Language and Historical Consciousness], Shanghai: Fudan University Press, 2015.
- Ershi Shiji Deguo Wenxue Sixiang Lungao [On German literary thought in the 20th century], Beijing: Peking University Press, 2014.
- Der Westen und das Reich der Mitte - Die Verbreitung westlichen Wissens im spätkaiserlichen China [The West and the Middle Kingdom - The spread of Western knowledge in Late Imperial China], Wiesbaden/New York: Harrassowitz, 2013.
- Selbstreflexion in der Zeit des Erwachens und des Widerstands – Moderne Chinesische Literatur 1919-1949 (Self-reflection at a time of awakening and resistance – Modern Chinese literature, 1919–1949), in the series: Lun Wen. Studien zur Geistesgeschichte und Literatur in China, Bd. 7, Wiesbaden: Harrassowitz Verlag 2006, 671 pp.
- Das Chinabild in der deutschen Literatur, 1871-1933 (The image of China in German literature, 1871-1933). Ein Beitrag zur komparatistischen Imagologie, Frankfurt/M, Berlin, Bern, New York, Paris, Wien: Peter Lang Verlag 1992, 433 pp.
- Brecht und Lu Xun. Eine Studie zum Verfremdungseffekt (Brecht and Lu Xun: Notes on the V-effect, or estrangement effect), Pfaffenweiler: Centaurus-Verlagsgesellschaft 1991, 116 pp.
- Bulaixite (i.e., Brecht), Shenyang: Liaoning chubanshe (Liaoning Publishing House) 1985, 143 pp.

=== Books edited ===
- Haiwai Hanxue yu Zhongguo Wenlun 海外汉学与中国文论 (欧洲卷) [Sinologie internationale (la contribution de l'Europe) et théorie littéraire chinoise / International Sinology (the contribution of Europe) and Chinese Literary Theory], Beijing: Beijing Normal University Publishing House, 2019, 11+496 p.
- Tension in World Literature: Between the Local and the Universal (Des Tensions dans la littérature mondiale : entre le local et l'universel). London; New York; Singapore: Palgrave Macmillan, 2018, 398 p.
- Sixiang yu Fangfa: Jindai Zhongguo de Wenhua Zhengzhi yu Zhishi Jiangou [Ideas and Methods: Cultural Politics and the Construction of Knowledge in Modern China], Beijing: Peking University Press, 2015.
- Sixiang yu Fangfa: Quanqiuhua Shidai Zhongxi Duihua de Keneng [Ideas and Methods: Possibilities of a Chinese-Western Dialogue in a Globalized Age], Beijing: Peking University Press, 2014. .
- Wenxue Shehuixue Xinbian [New Compilation of Texts on the Sociology of Literature], Beijing: Beijing Normal University Publishing House, 2011.
- Federspiel, Jürg, Yuwang Dili [Geographie der Lust, Roman], ed. and transl. to Chinese by Fang Weigui, Nanjing: YI LIN (TRANSLATIONS) 2001, 188 pp.
- Den Kranich fragen. 155 Gedichte von Bai Juyi (bilingual edition), transl. by Fang Weigui et al., Göttingen: Cuvillier Verlag 1999, 362 pp.
- Aiqing De Gushi – Deyu Guojia Qingshi San Bai Shou / 300 deutsche Liebesgedichte, transl. to Chinese by Fang Weigui, Beijing: Zuojia chubanshe (The Chinese Writers Publishing House) 1996, 476 pp.

=== Honours and awards ===
Fang Weigui was awarded the title of a Distinguished Professor by Beijing Normal University and he is a Changjiang Scholar.
