= Li Portenlänger =

German printmaker, painter, and performance artist

Li Portenlaenger (b, 1952 in Eichstaett, Bavaria) is a German printmaker, painter, and performance artist.

Li Portenlaenger studied 3 D design (printmaking and painting) in 1974-1978 at the Bremen Art Academy (Hochschule fur Kunste Bremen). Subsequently, she has studied modern dance under Gerd Leon at the Fachschule Freier Moderner Tanz.She also studied lithographic printmaking at the RhoK Flemish Art Academy in Brussels under R. Broulim. In addition, she studied historical dance and Chinese body-focused art on her own and with private (for instance Chinese) teachers.

The main body of her artistic work consists of lithographic art works. Since 1998 she is in charge of the Lithographic Workshop Eichstaett that is supported by the city.

She regularly invites international artists as artists in residence, and has taken part as a speaker and guest artist in international congresses on lithography in Britain, Belgium, China, the Netherlands and other countries. Her work was particularly admired by colleagues in the P.R. China when she was in Tianjin.

Li Portenlaenger has curated several art projects that were reviewed favorably by art critics in the press, for instance the project Hortus-Wunder-Wanderkammer. She also participated in a collective art project with a Canadian artist, a Belgium artist, and a poet that took up the artistic impulse of Alois Wuensche-Mitterecker, a sculptor and early creator of land art who had created the large Figurenfeld ensemble of sculptures placed in the lonely landscape of the Frankonian Jura Mountains near Eichstaett. This land art ensemble reminds people of the terrible Second World War unleashed by Nazi Germany. It is a warning against all wars. The project of the three artists and the poet, their art works and poems inspired by the Figurenfeld, were discussed in the South German press.

Li Portenlaenger took part in lithographic projects and had group exhibitions and single exhibitions in many countries, including Austria, Italy, Belgium, the U.S., the Netherlands, Switzerland, the Czech Republic, China, Scotland; and of course Germany. In addition she has realized several art projects in public space, for instance in Eichstaett and in Bremen, Germany, and was invited to do performances in art museums, art galleries, and churches. In 2014, the artist Doris Schoettler-Boll invited her to speak about her work as a visual artist and her projects as director of the Eichstaett Lithography Workshop and its international artist in residence program in the Art House Essen.
