= Yinxiang (magazine) =

Taiwanese film magazine

Yingxiang (Chinese: 影響雜誌; Influence Magazine) was a Chinese-language film journal published in Taiwan, comparable in its significance as a platform of debate to the importance of the Cahiers du Cinéma for the French debate about film, the significance of Bianco e nero in the Italian context, the impact of Filmkritik in Germany and of Screen for English-speaking cinema lovers.

== The name ==
The name of the journal is sometimes translated as Impact Magazine in English language publications. Chen Xihe, for instance, uses this name. Yingxiang is the correct pinyin version used in the P.R.China and internationally by Sinologists. Impact is a correct translation of 影響. But in Taiwan, 影響 is usually transliterated Yinxiang and the issues of the magazine that appeared in the 1970s featured both 影響 (Yingxiang) and the English words Influence magazine (rather than Impact magazine)on the front cover. (Note: Many readers of the journal will remember this. It also suffices to look at old copies held by libraries or the Taipei Film Archive to confirm it. The name Influence magazine is additionally confirmed by the film director Lee Daw-ming, a former editor of Yinxiang. (Check his article entitled “Influence Magazine 《影響》雜誌”, mentioned in: External links. – The English words “Influence Magazine” are highlighted by him, as they form part of the heading of this article written in Mandarin.) – The issue discussed here is of course of minor importance.)

== Beginnings ==
A press report on the start of Influence film magazine titled “Wang Hsiao-hsiang founded Yinxiang magazine” appeared on Dec. 10, 1971 in a Taipei newspaper. It is reprinted in “The Chronicle of Taiwan Cinema 1898–2000”, a publication that consists of several volumes published by the Chinese Taipei Film Archive. The report says that “following the example of the Theater (劇場) magazine, Influence Magazine, a professional publication dedicated to the exploration of film, was founded today”. (Note: Also online, see the Chinese Taipei Film Archive website..) The press report reprinted in the book gives December 1971 as the date for the founding, while Lin Mucai writes that the magazine “was founded in 1972”. He probably refers to the date when the first issue appeared. (Note: This is confirmed by Lín Mùcái (林木材). (Check his article on Yinxiang zazhi (影響雜誌) mentioned in External links.).) The disagreement (December 1971 or (early?) 1972) is of course of small significance. The fact that an article reporting the founding of the magazine appeared on December 10, 1971 is of course good evidence. But it does not tell us when the first issue appeared in print.

In an interview that is summed up in a publication done for (and by) Taida alumni, Prof. Lee Daw-ming who was an editor of Yinxiang in the late 1970s, said that "Dan Han-Chang (Dàn Hàn Zhāng), a National Taiwan University law school graduate, Zhuo Botang (National Chengchi University (NCCU)) and Duan Zhongyi (NCCU)… started Yinxiang Magazine (in 1972)”.

In this interview, Lee Daw-ming observed that the timely convergence of several favorable conditions led to the birth of the first professional film publication. 1.) First, the United States Information Service vigorously promoted film. 2.) Wang Hsiao-hsiang came back from the United States and brought back concepts of film aesthetics, 3.) Yin Yun-peng, Lin Hwai-min and others started to teach at National Chengchi University, 4.) Tang Shu Shuen shot Mrs. Dong (1970), a film that aroused international attention. It was a time when the arts flourished, on campus it set off a craze for the movies.

== The editors ==
The report quoted in the Chronicle of Taiwan Cinema gave more details. It did not only mention that "Wang Hsiao-hsiang serves as publisher" but added: "The editors’ group includes Zhuo Botang (卓伯棠), Zhu Daokai (朱道凱), Qiu Liben (邱立本), Chen Wenqi (陳文祺), Dan Hanzhang (但漢章), Yu Weizheng (余為政) in Japan, Zheng Shusen (鄭樹森) in the U.S., and Qiu Jiatao (丘家韜), also in the U.S." To this basic information regarding the original editorial staff, an anecdote concerning one of the editors mentioned in the book may be added: According to Lin Mucai, it was Dan Han Chang (但漢章), a graduate of the law school of Taida (National Taiwan University) who had a key role. As a sensitive film journalist, he was writing fine articles for the new publication. Lín Mùcái (林木材) recalls how Dan got the job: "Because he liked movies, he often went to places dedicated to the arts in order to chat and have tea and by chance he met the founder of Yinxiang magazine. Wang Hsiao-hsiang was stunned to see a young man so passionate about movies, and invited him to write texts for Influence." Dan Han Chang later on became a film director. (Note: Cf. what Lin Mucai (林木材) says in this respect. (Check his article on "Dan Han Zhang (但漢章)" mentioned in External links.))

== Reviews ==
The Chronicle of Taiwan Cinema notes: "In its first issue, the journal stated that film art, attaining the height of its development, became the most influential language of the 20th century. But in China, due to the producers, the government, the audience, and even multiple misunderstandings and intellectuals attacks, it presented a distorted face. Therefore the journal will be professional, embracing an academic point of view, offering in-depth analysis oriented toward Western movies, guiding people positively and working for the development of a mature film art in the country."

Critic Chen Xihe wrote:

As for film journals, Impact (Yingxiang), founded by Wang Xiaoxiang on December 10, 1971, was most influential among Taiwan film critics in the 1970s. The magazine was suspended twice in the 1980s and 1990s, and ceased publication in 1998. However, it covered the most prosperous time of Taiwan film and was once regarded as a symbol of film criticism in Taiwan.

— Chen Xihe, Chinese Film Scholarship in Chinese (Note: Xiaoxiang - Wang Hsiao-hsiang; pinyin: Wang Xiaoxiang; English: Ivan Wang ))

Professor Lee Daw-ming called Yinxiang "Taiwan's most representative film research publication" in the 1970s. (Note: This is asserted by the film director Lee Daw-ming, a university professor and former editor of Yinxiang / Influence film magazine. It confirms the view of Chen Xihe. (Check Lee Daw-ming's article entitled "Influence Magazine" (《影響》雜誌) mentioned in: External links.))

== New era of Taiwan cinema ==
The debate carried on in the pages of Yinxiang reflected face-to-face debates and in turn, it found an echo in such debates. The Cinema of Taiwan which had been either very cheap and commercial or an even cheaper tool of KMT propaganda, was off to a new start. The year 1979 saw two films by Li Hsing, Story of A Small Town and Good Morning, Taipei. A year later, Hou Hsiao-hsien's first feature film, Cute Girls, was released. A good future for a serious film publication was what everyone expected.

== Dissident publishing ==
The cultural debate and the debate focused on the need for democracy were inseparable between 1976 and 1980. It made the Kuomintang (KMT) nervous. Dissidents became active more openly than before, despite martial law. A politician of the pro-democracy movement ran for office as a non-party candidate and was elected as “magistrate” of Taoyuan. But then, things escalated. “Taoyuan's magistrate was murdered.” It was a surprise for everyone, especially for the regime, that the opposition was not intimidated at once. “In 1978, …increasingly bold demonstrations swept Taiwan.” The conflict would lead up to the so-called Kaohsiung incident in 1979.

As publisher of Yinxiang, Wang Hsiao-hsiang was daring at the time. In 1978, at the height of the conflict which had begun as a controversial debate over the Taiwanese literature movement that advocated Nativist literature, Wang okayed the publication of an article about a forbidden film. The film in question was Wim Umboh’s ‘Plastic Flowers.’ At the time, Wim Umboh's film was scheduled to be screened at the 1978 Taipei Film Festival. But when the festival had already commenced, the censors suddenly determined that ‘Plastic Flowers’ could not be shown. It focused too obviously on the ‘dark sides’ of society. The Yinxiang people, above all Lee Daw-ming (who was then the editor of the journal), managed however to organize a private screening for film journalists. A German film critic, who was invited by Lee Daw-ming to see the film, interviewed Wim Umboh and wrote the film review for Yinxiang. (Note: This film review has also been published in English. – Art in Society (ISSN 1618-2154) also republished the Chinese version that appeared in Yinxiang in 1978.)

== An abrupt end ==
- Yinxiang abruptly ceased operations in September 1979. Pressure exerted by the censors of the KMT's censorship and propaganda office, the G.I.O., or the voiding of its licence is a likely cause.
- In December 1979, the demonstrations in Kaohsiung led to the closing down of political magazines of the opposition, especially Meilidao (美麗島, Formosa Magazine), and to the arrest of their editors, among them the Formosa magazine editors Shih Ming-teh and Annette Lu. The opposition magazine Qia Chao (夏潮, China Tide Magazine, lit. 'Summer Tide') was closed down for good already in spring, 1979, after 35 of its issues had been banned since its inception in early 1976.
- 1979 was not a good year for courageous editors in Taiwan.

== A re-beginning ==
A new series of Yinxiang started to appear on November 20, 1989. Its publication was interrupted more than once. Martial law in Taiwan was lifted 1987. The film magazine closed permanently on December 1, 1998.
