= Bai Juyi =

Chinese poet of the Tang dynasty (772-846)

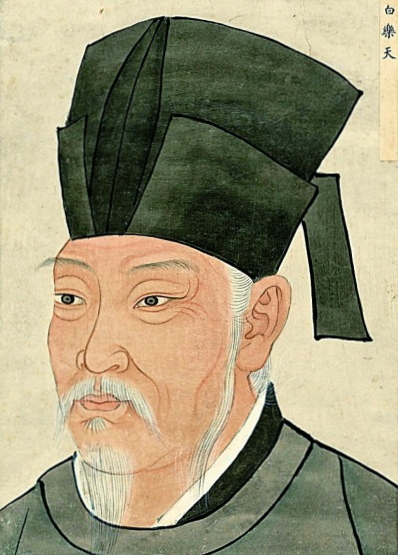
- Portrait of Bai Juyi by Chen Hongshou
- Born: 772; Xinzheng, Henan, China
- Died: 846 (aged 73–74); Xiangshan Temple, Longmen (Luoyang), Henan, China
- Occupations: Musician, poet, politician
- Children: Bai Acui (son)
- Relatives: Bai Huang (grandfather); Bai Jigeng

Chinese name
- Chinese: 白居易
Transcriptions
Standard Mandarin
- Hanyu Pinyin: Bái Jūyì (col.); Bó Jūyì (lit.)
- Wade–Giles: Pai^{2} Chü^{1}-i^{4} (col.); Po^{2} Chü^{1}-i^{4} (lit.)
- IPA: [pǎɪ tɕý.î] (col.) [pwǒ tɕý.î] (lit.)
Yue: Cantonese
- Yale Romanization: Baahk Gēui-yih
- Jyutping: Baak^{6} Geoi^{1}-ji^{6}
- IPA: [pak̚˨ kɵɥ˥.ji˨]
Southern Min
- Tâi-lô: Pe̍h Ku-ī (col.); Pi̍k Ku-ī (lit.)
Middle Chinese
- Middle Chinese: Bɐk Kjwo-jie^{C}

Letian
- Traditional Chinese: 樂天
- Simplified Chinese: 乐天
Transcriptions
Standard Mandarin
- Hanyu Pinyin: Lètiān
Yue: Cantonese
- Jyutping: Lok6 Tin1
Southern Min
- Hokkien POJ: Lo̍k-thian
- Tâi-lô: Lo̍k-thian

Xiangshan Jushi
- Chinese: 香山居士
- Literal meaning: Householder of Mount Xiang
Transcriptions
Standard Mandarin
- Hanyu Pinyin: Xiāngshān Jūshì
Yue: Cantonese
- Jyutping: Hoeng1 Saan1 Geoi1 Si6
Southern Min
- Hokkien POJ: Hiong-san Ku-sū
- Tâi-lô: Hiong-san Ku-sū

Korean name
- Hangul: 백거이
- Hanja: 白居易
Transcriptions
- McCune–Reischauer: Paek Kŏi

Japanese name
- Kanji: 白居易
- Hiragana: はく きょい
Transcriptions
- Romanization: Haku Kyo'i

Bai Juyi (also Bo Juyi or Po Chü-i; Chinese: 白居易, Mandarin pinyin Bái Jūyì; 772–846), courtesy name Letian (樂天), was a Chinese musician, poet, and politician during the Tang dynasty. Many of his poems concern his career or observations made about everyday life, including as governor of three different provinces. He achieved fame as a writer of verse in a low-key, near vernacular style that was popular throughout medieval East Asia.

Bai was also influential in the historical development of Japanese literature, where he is better known by the on'yomi reading of his courtesy name, Haku Rakuten (shinjitai: 白楽天). His younger brother Bai Xingjian was a short story writer.

Among his most famous works are the long narrative poems "Chang Hen Ge" ("Song of Everlasting Sorrow"), which tells the story of Yang Guifei, and "Pipa xing" ("Song of the Pipa").

== Life ==
Bai Juyi lived during the Middle Tang period. This was a period of rebuilding and recovery for the Tang Empire, following the An Lushan Rebellion, and following the poetically flourishing era famous for Li Bai (701－762), Wang Wei (701－761), and Du Fu (712－770). Bai Juyi lived through the reigns of eight or nine emperors, being born in the Dali regnal era (766-779) of Emperor Daizong of Tang. He had a long and successful career both as a government official and a poet, although these two facets of his career seemed to have come in conflict with each other at certain points. Bai Juyi was also a devoted Chan Buddhist.

=== Birth and childhood ===
Bai Juyi was born in 772 in Taiyuan, Shanxi, which was then located a few miles from the modern city, although he was in Zhengyang, Henan for most of his childhood. His family was poor but scholarly, his father being an Assistant Department Magistrate of the second-class. At the age of ten he was sent away from his family to avoid a war that broke out in the north of China. He went to live with relatives in the area known as Jiangnan, more specifically Xuzhou. His father's death in 794 led to a period of hard times for the family.

=== Early career ===
Bai Juyi's education was delayed by seven years due to his father's death. He passed the jinshi examinations in 800. Bai Juyi may have taken up residence in the western capital city of Chang'an in 801. Not long after this, he formed a long friendship with a scholar Yuan Zhen. 806, the first full year of the reign of Emperor Xianzong of Tang, was the year when Bai Juyi was appointed to a minor post as a government official, at Zhouzhi, which was not far from Chang'an (and also in Shaanxi province). He was made a member (scholar) of the Hanlin Academy, in 807, and Reminder of the Left from 807 until 815, except when in 811 his mother died, and he spent the traditional three-year mourning period again along the Wei River, before returning to court in the winter of 814, where he held the title of Assistant Secretary to the Prince's Tutor. It was not a high-ranking position, but nevertheless one which he was soon to lose.

=== Exile ===
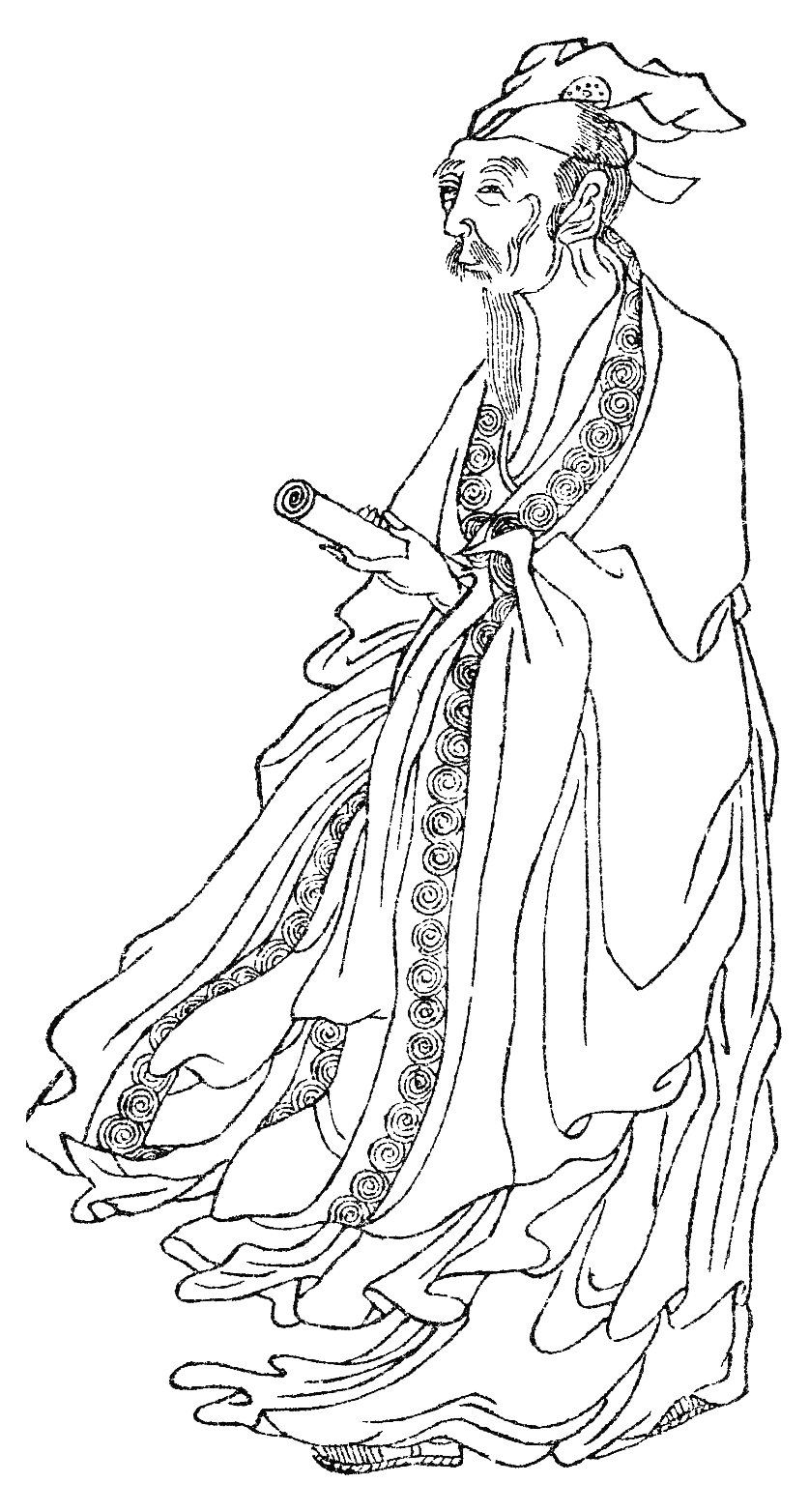
Picture of Bai Juyi from the book "Wan hsiao tang".

While serving as a minor palace official in 814, Bai managed to get himself in official trouble. He made enemies at court and with certain individuals in other positions. It was partly his written works which led him into trouble. He wrote two long memorials, translated by Arthur Waley as "On Stopping the War", regarding what he considered to be an overly lengthy campaign against a minor group of Tatars; and he wrote a series of poems, in which he satirized the actions of greedy officials and highlighting the sufferings of the common folk.

At this time, one of the post-An Lushan warlords (jiedushi), Wu Yuanji in Henan, had seized control of Zhangyi Circuit (centered in Zhumadian), an act for which he sought reconciliation with the imperial government, trying to get an imperial pardon as a necessary prerequisite. Despite the intercession of influential friends, Wu was denied, thus officially putting him in the position of rebellion. Still seeking a pardon, Wu turned to assassination, blaming the Prime Minister, Wu Yuanheng, and other officials: the imperial court generally began by dawn, requiring the ministers to rise early in order to attend in a timely manner; and, on July 13, 815, before dawn, the Tang Prime Minister Wu Yuanheng was set to go to the palace for a meeting with Emperor Xianzong. As he left his house, arrows were fired at his retinue. His servants all fled, and the assassins seized Wu Yuanheng and his horse, and then decapitated him, taking his head with them. The assassins also attacked another official who favored the campaign against the rebellious warlords, Pei Du, but was unable to kill him. The people at the capital were shocked and there was turmoil, with officials refusing to leave their personal residences until after dawn.

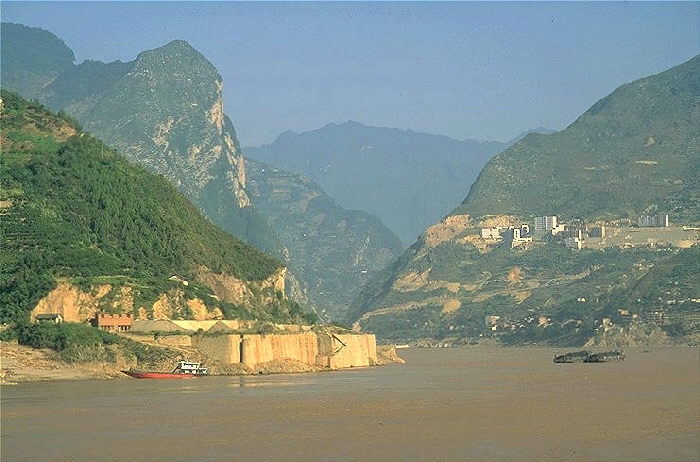
The Three Gorges of the Yangzi had to be traversed on the boat ride from Jiujiang to Sichuan.

In this context, Bai Juyi overstepped his minor position by memorializing the emperor. As Assistant Secretary to the Prince's Tutor, Bai's memorial was a breach of protocol — he should have waited for those of censorial authority to take the lead before offering his own criticism. This was not the only charge which his opponents used against him. His mother had died, apparently caused by falling into a well while looking at some flowers, and two poems written by Bai Juyi — the titles of which Waley translates as "In Praise of Flowers" and "The New Well" — were used against him as a sign of lack of Filial Piety, one of the Confucian ideals. The result was exile. Bai Juyi was demoted to the rank of Sub-Prefect and banished from the court and the capital city to Jiujiang, then known as Xun Yang, on the southern shores of the Yangtze River in northwest Jiangxi Province. After three years, he was sent as Governor of a remote place in Sichuan. At the time, the main travel route there was up the Yangzi River. This trip allowed Bai Juyi a few days to visit his friend Yuan Zhen, who was also in exile and with whom he explored the rock caves located at Yichang. Bai Juyi was delighted by the flowers and trees for which his new location was noted. In 819, he was recalled back to the capital, ending his exile.

=== Return to the capital and a new emperor ===
In 819, Bai Juyi was recalled to the capital and given the position of second-class Assistant Secretary. In 821, China got a new emperor, Muzong. After succeeding to the throne, Muzong spent his time feasting and heavily drinking and neglecting his duties as emperor. Meanwhile, the temporarily subdued regional military governors, jiedushi, began to challenge the central Tang government, leading to the new de facto independence of three circuits north of the Yellow River, which had been previously subdued by Emperor Xianzong. Furthermore, Muzong's administration was characterized by massive corruption. Again, Bai Juyi wrote a series of memorials in remonstrance.

=== As Governor of Hangzhou ===
Again, Bai Juyi was sent away from the court and the capital in 822, but this time to the important position of the thriving town of Hangzhou, which was at the southern terminus of the Grand Canal and located in the scenic neighborhood of West Lake. Fortunately for their friendship, Yuan Zhen at the time was serving an assignment in nearby Ningbo, also in what is today Zhejiang, so the two could occasionally get together, at least until Bai Juyi's term as Governor expired.

As governor of Hangzhou, Bai Juyi realized that the farmland nearby depended on the water of West Lake, but, due to the negligence of previous governors, the old dike had collapsed and the lake had dried out to the point that the local farmers were suffering from severe drought. He ordered the construction of a stronger and taller dike, with a dam to control the flow of water, thus providing water for irrigation, relieving the drought, and improving the livelihood of the local people over the following years. Bai Juyi used his leisure time to enjoy the beauty of West Lake, visiting the lake almost every day. He ordered the construction of a causeway to allow walking on foot, instead of requiring the services of a boat. A causeway in the West Lake (Baisha Causeway, 白沙堤) was later referred to as Bai Causeway in Bai Juyi's honor, but the original causeway built by Bai Juyi named Baigong Causeway (白公堤) no longer exists.

=== Life near Luoyang ===
In 824, Bai Juyi's commission as governor expired, and he received the nominal rank of Imperial Tutor, which provided more in the way of official salary than official duties, and he relocated his household to a suburb of the "eastern capital," Luoyang. At the time, Luoyang was known as the eastern capital of the empire and was a major metropolis with a population of around one million and a reputation as the "cultural capital," as opposed to the more politically oriented capital of Chang'an.

=== Governor of Suzhou ===
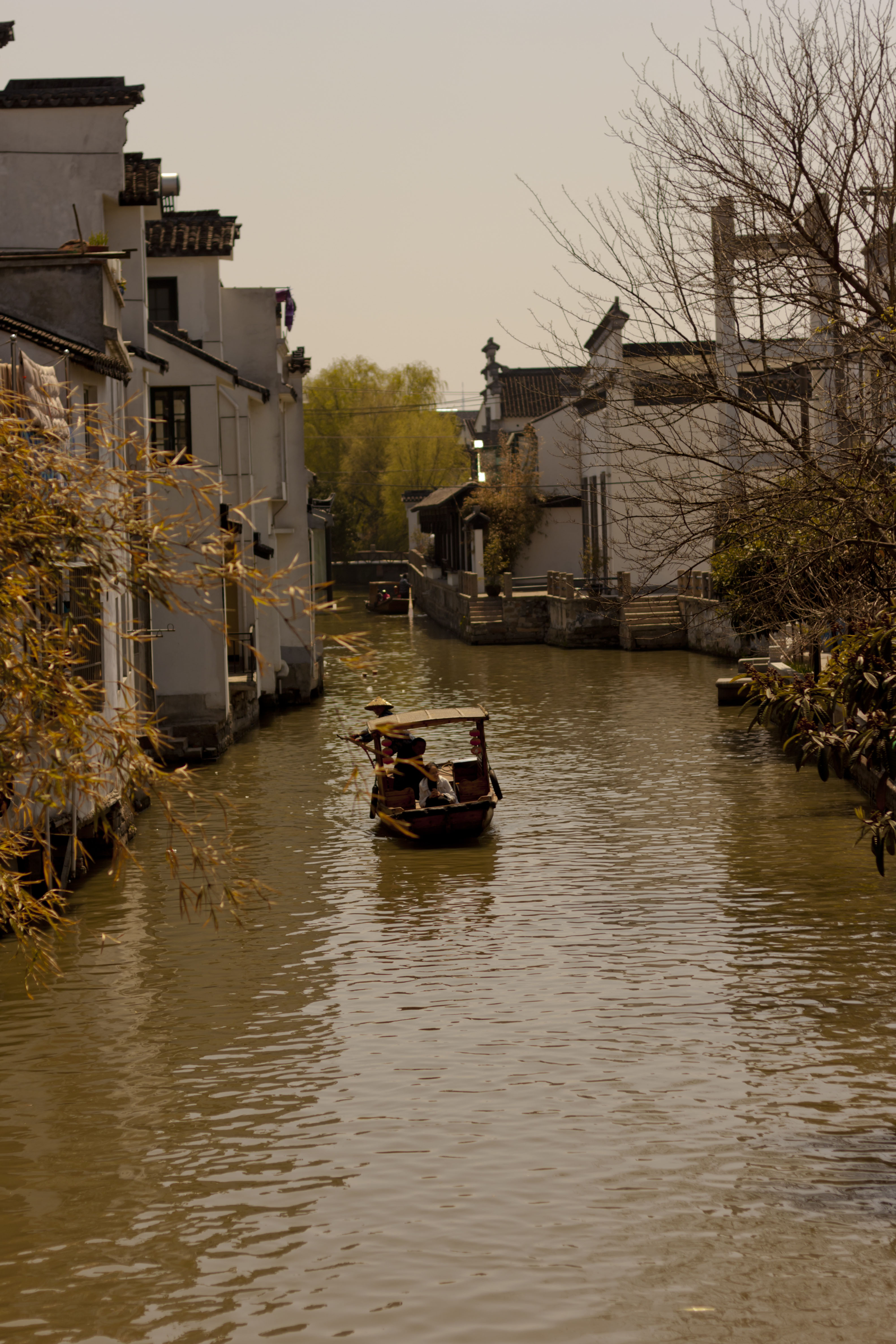
Suzhou

In 825, at age 53, Bai Juyi was given the position of Governor (Prefect) of Suzhou, situated on the lower reaches of the Yangtze River and on the shores of Lake Tai. For the first two years, he enjoyed himself with feasts and picnic outings, but after a couple years he became ill and was forced into a period of retirement.

=== Later career ===
After his time as Prefect of Hangzhou (822-824) and then Suzhou (825-827), Bai Juyi returned to the capital. He then served in various official posts in the capital, and then again as prefect/governor, this time in Henan, the province in which Luoyang was located. It was in Henan that his first son was born, though only to die prematurely the next year. In 831 Yuan Zhen died. For the next thirteen years, Bai Juyi continued to hold various nominal posts but actually lived in retirement.

=== Retirement ===
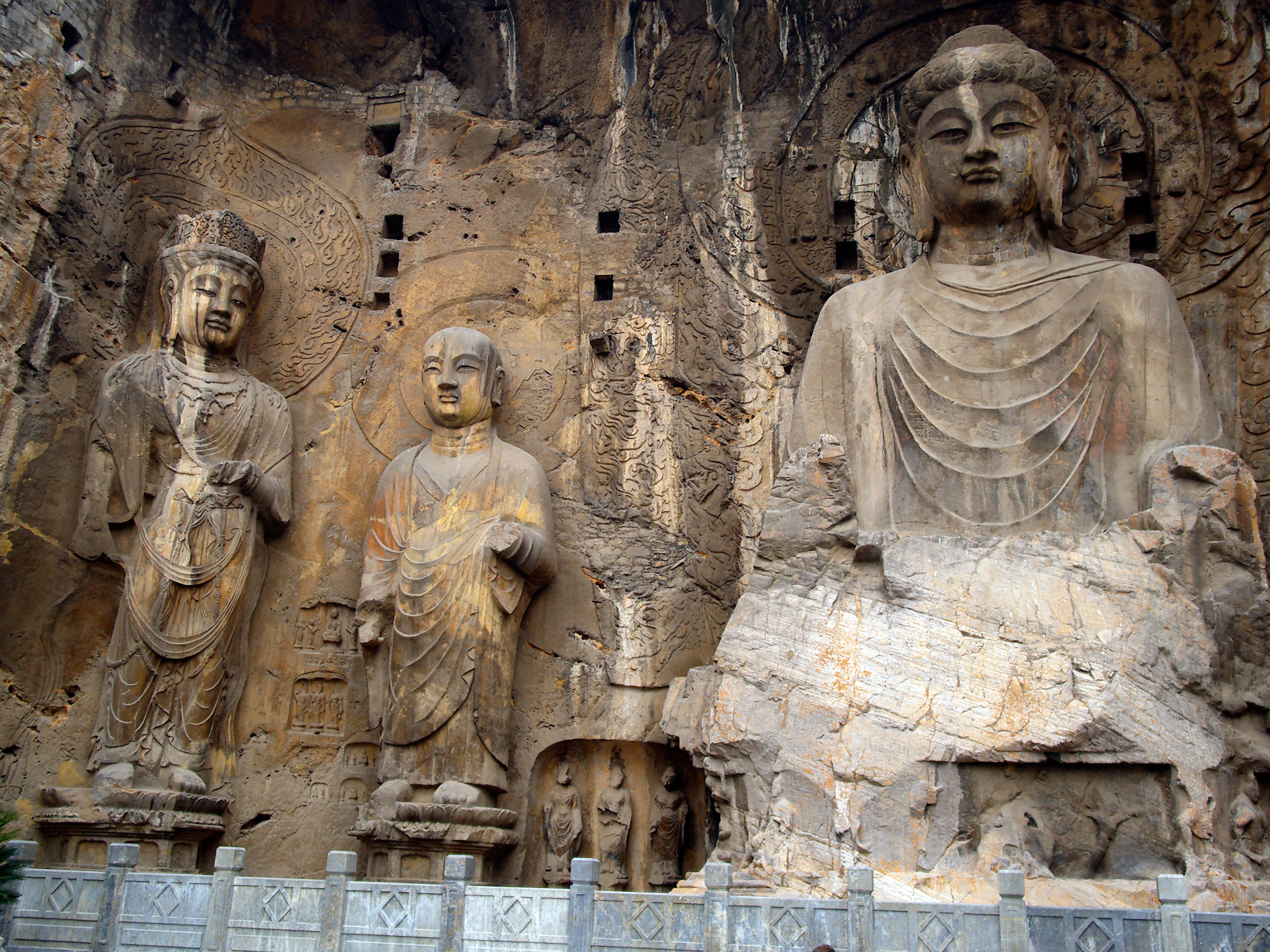
Buddha and Bodhisattva images carved out of rock, at Longmen

In 832, Bai Juyi repaired an unused part of the Xiangshan Monastery, at Longmen, about 7.5 miles south of Luoyang. Bai Juyi moved to this location, and began to refer to himself as the "Hermit of Xiangshan". This area, now a UNESCO World Heritage Site, is famous for its tens of thousands of statues of Buddha and his disciples carved out of the rock. In 839, he experienced a paralytic attack, losing the use of his left leg, and became a bedridden invalid for several months. After his partial recovery, he spent his final years arranging his Collected Works, which he presented to the main monasteries of those localities in which he had spent time.

=== Death ===
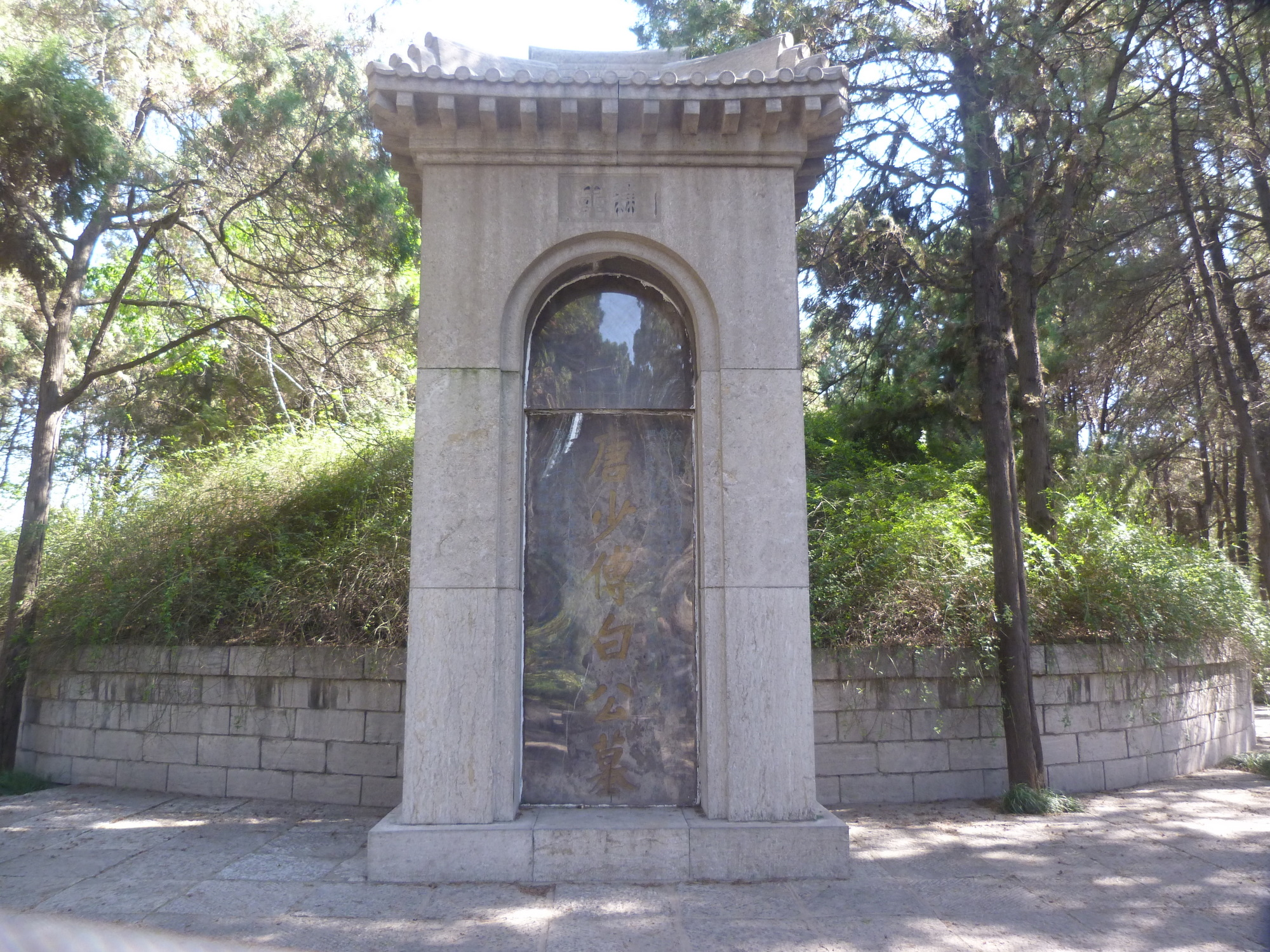
The Tomb of Bai Juyi.

In 846, Bai Juyi died, leaving instructions for a simple burial in a grave at the monastery, with a plain style funeral, and to not have a posthumous title conferred upon him. He has a tomb monument in Longmen, situated on Xiangshan across the Yi River from the Longmen cave temples in the vicinity of Luoyang, Henan. It is a circular mound of earth 4 metres (13 ft) high and 52 metres (171 ft) in circumference, with a 2.8-metre (9 ft 2 in) tall monument inscribed "Bai Juyi".

== Works ==
Bai Juyi has been known for his plain, direct, and easily comprehensible style of verse, as well as for his social and political criticism. Besides his surviving poems, several letters and essays are also extant.

He collected his writings in the anthology called the Bai Zhi Wen Ji.

=== History ===
One of the most prolific of the Tang poets, Bai Juyi wrote over 2,800 poems, which he had copied and distributed to ensure their survival. They are notable for their relative accessibility: it is said that he would rewrite any part of a poem if one of his servants was unable to understand it. The accessibility of Bai Juyi's poems made them extremely popular in his lifetime, in both China and Japan, and they continue to be read in these countries today. His writings are also popular in Korea and Vietnam.

=== Famous poems ===
One of Bai's most famous poems is "Chang hen ge" ("Song of Everlasting Sorrow"), a long narrative poem that tells the story of the famous Tang dynasty concubine Yang Guifei and her relationship with Emperor Xuanzong of Tang.

Han's sovereign prized the beauty of flesh, he longed for such as ruins domains;
For many years he ruled the Earth and sought for one in vain.
A daughter there was of the house of Yang, just grown to maturity,
Raised deep in the women's quarters where no man knew of her.
When Heaven begets beauteous things, it is loath to let them be wasted,
So one morning this maiden was chosen to be by the ruler's side.
When she turned around with smiling glance, she exuded every charm;
In the harem all who wore powder and paint of beauty then seemed barren.

In springtime's chill he let her bathe in Huaqing Palace's pools
Whose warm springs' glistening waters washed flecks of dried lotions away.
Those in attendance helped her rise, in helplessness so charming—
This was the moment when first she enjoyed the flood of royal favor.
Tresses like cloud, face like a flower, gold pins that swayed to her steps;
It was warm in the lotus-embroidered tents where they passed the nights of spring.
And the nights of spring seemed all too short, the sun would too soon rise,
From this point on our lord and king avoided daybreak court.

— "Song of Lasting Pain" (Chang hen ge 長恨歌), opening lines
(Stephen Owen, trans.)
Translation:

漢皇重色思傾國，
御宇多年求不得。
楊家有女初長成，
養在深閨人未識。
天生麗質難自棄，
一朝選在君王側。
回眸一笑百媚生，
六宮粉黛無顏色。

春寒賜浴華清池，
溫泉水滑洗凝脂。
侍兒扶起嬌無力，
始是新承恩澤時。
雲鬢花顏金步搖，
芙蓉帳暖度春宵。
春宵苦短日高起，
從此君王不早朝。

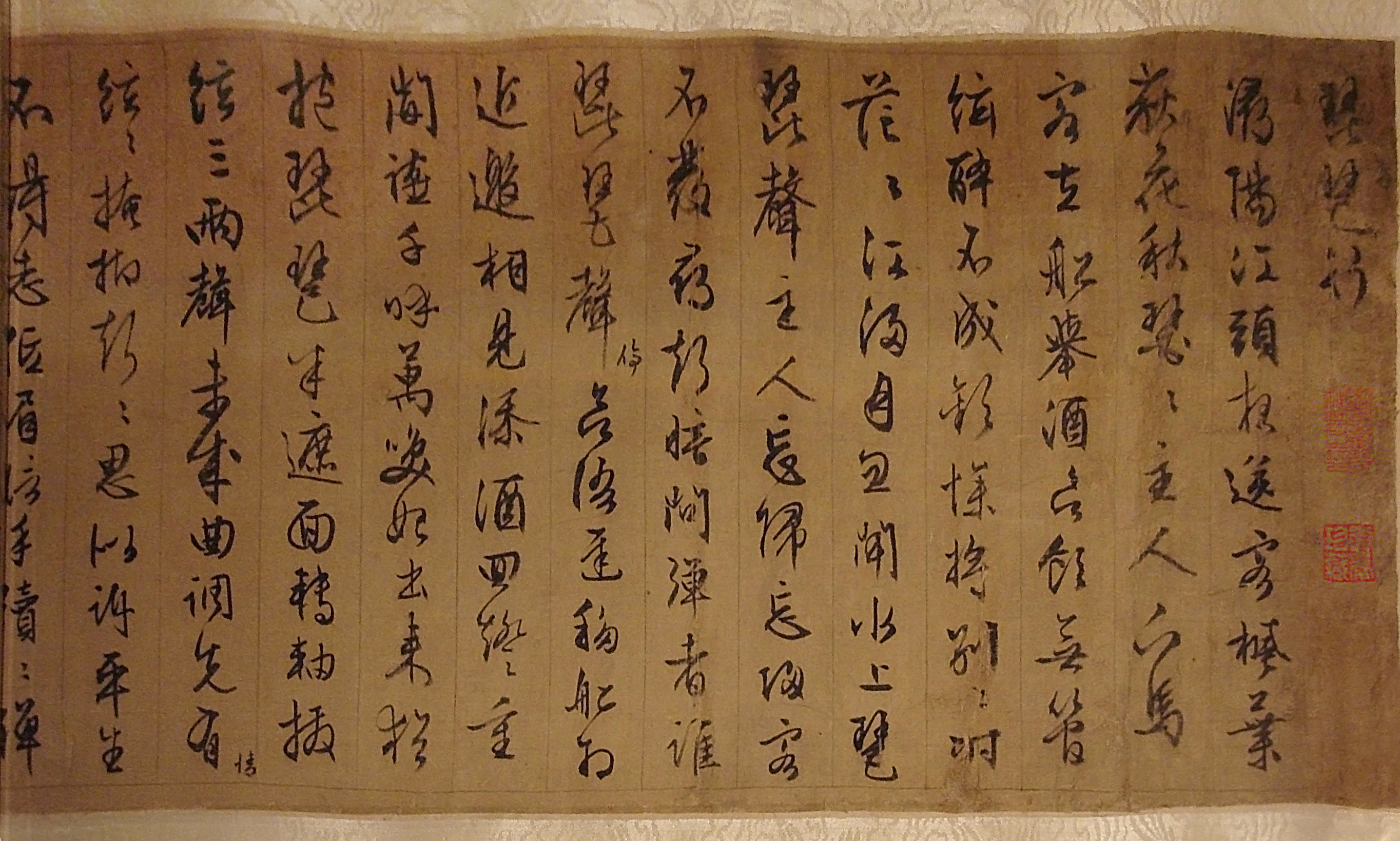
Bai Juyi's "Pi Pa Xing", in running script, calligraphy by Wen Zhengming, Ming dynasty.

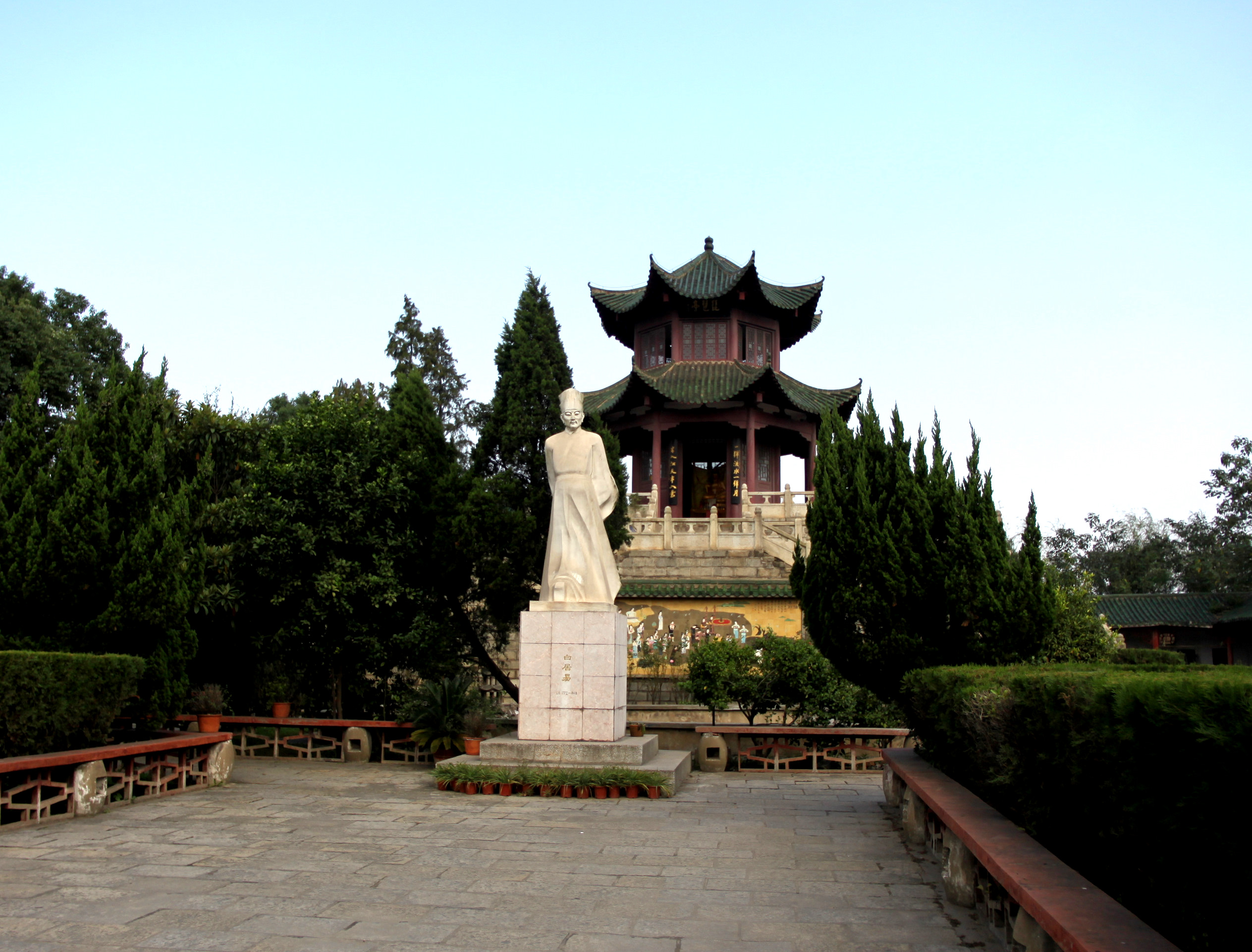
Bai Juyi statue in front of Pipa Pavilion on the Xunyang River at Jiujiang, where he wrote his "The Song of the Pipa Player" poem.

Another of Bai's famous poems is "The Song of the Pipa Player". Like Du Fu, Bai had a strong sense of social responsibility and is well known for his satirical poems, such as The Elderly Charcoal Seller. Also he wrote about military conflicts during the Tang dynasty. Poems like "Song of Everlasting Sorrow" were examples of the peril in China during the An Lushan rebellion.

Bai Juyi also wrote intensely romantic poems to fellow officials with whom he studied and traveled. These speak of sharing wine, sleeping together, and viewing the Moon and mountains. One friend, Yu Shunzhi, sent Bai a bolt of cloth as a gift from a far-off posting, and Bai Juyi debated on how best to use the precious material:

About to cut it to make a mattress,
pitying the breaking of the leaves;
about to cut it to make a bag,
pitying the dividing of the flowers.
It is better to sew it,
making a coverlet of joined delight;
I think of you as if I'm with you,
day or night.

Bai's works were also highly renowned in Japan, and many of his poems were quoted and referenced in The Tale of Genji by Murasaki Shikibu. Zeami Motokiyo also quoted from Bai, in his Noh plays, and even wrote one, Haku Rakuten, about the Japanese god of poetry repelling the Chinese poet from Japan, in opposition to Bai's (perceived) challenge to the country's poetic autonomy.

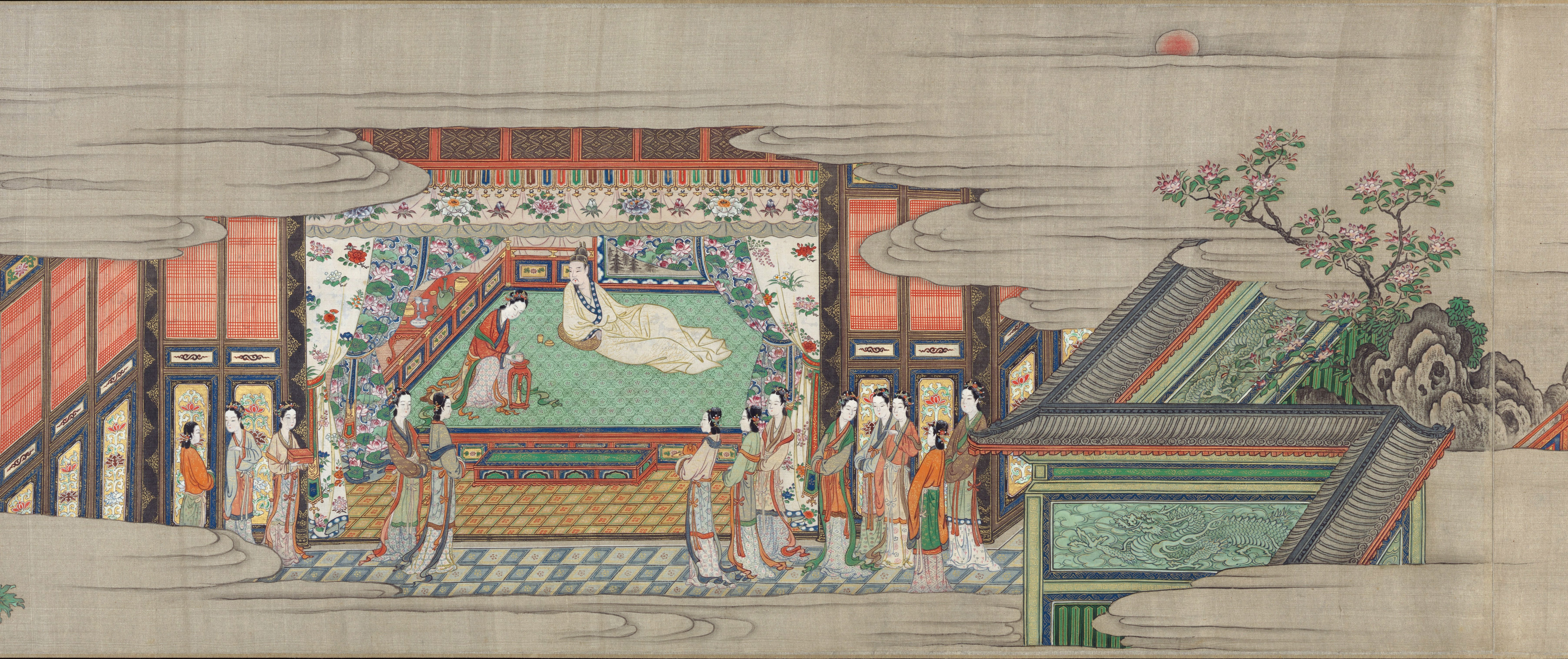
Scene from the poem Chang Hen Ge, depicting Emperor Xuanzong (center) and his concubines. Japanese painting by Kanō Sansetsu (1590-1651).

=== Poetic forms ===
Bai Juyi was known for his interest in the old yuefu form of poetry, which was a typical form of Han poetry, namely folk ballad verses, collected or written by the Music Bureau. These were often a form of social protest. And, in fact, writing poetry to promote social progress was explicitly one of his objectives. He is also known for his well-written poems in the regulated verse style.

=== Art criticism ===
Bai was a poet of the middle Tang dynasty. It was a period after the An Lushan Rebellion, the Tang Empire was in rebuilding and recovery. As a government official and a litterateur, Bai observed the court music performance that was seriously affected by Xiyu (西域, Western regions), and he made some articles with indignation to criticize that phenomenon. As an informal leader of a group of poets who rejected the courtly style of the time and emphasized the didactic function of literature, Bai believing that every literary work should contain a fitting moral and a well-defined social purpose. That makes him not satisfied with cultural performance styles of Tang court.

For instance, in his work of Faqu ge (法曲歌), translated as Model Music, is a poem regard to a kind of performing art, he made the following statement: "All the faqu's now are combined with songs from the barbarians; but the barbarian music sounds evil and disordered whereas Han music sounds harmonious!" (法曲法曲合夷歌，夷聲邪亂華聲和)

Faqu is a kind of performing style of Yanyue, a part of court music performance. In this poem, Bai Juyi strongly criticized Tang Daqu, which was itself heavily influenced by some nonnative musical elements absent in the Han Daqu-the original form of Daqu. Tang culture was an amalgamation of the culture of the ethnic Han majority, the culture of the "Western Region" (西域), and Buddhism. The conflict between the mainstream Han culture and minority culture exposed after the An Lushan Rebellion. The alien culture was so popular and it had seriously threatened the status of Han culture.

Musical performances at the Tang court are of two types: seated performances (坐部) and standing performances (立部). Seated performances were conducted in smaller halls with a limited number of dancers, and emphasized refined artistry. Standing performances involves numerous dancers, and were usually performed in courtyards or squares intended for grand presentations.

Bai's another poem, Libuji (立部伎), translated as Standing Section Players, reflected the phenomenon of "decline in imperial court music". In this poem, Bai mercilessly pointed out that music style of both seated performances and standing performances were deeply influenced by foreign culture.

Seated performances are more elegant than standing performances. Players in the Seating Section were the most qualified performers, while the performing level of the players in the Standing Section were a bit poor (立部賤，坐部貴). In Bai Juyi's time, those two performances were full of foreign music, the Yayue (雅樂, literally: "elegant music") was no longer be performed in those two sections. The Yayue music was only performed by the players who were eliminated from those two sections (立部又退何所任，始就樂懸操雅音). This poem shows the culture changing in the middle Tang dynasty and the decline of Yayue, a form of classical music and dance performed at the royal court and temples

In those two poems of Bai reflected the situation of political and culture in the middle Tang dynasty after the An Lushan Rebellion, and he was concerned that the popularity of foreign music could lead the Tang society into chaos.

The pipa in the poems of Bai Juyi represents the expression of love, the action of communicating, and especially the poet's feelings on listening to music.

== Appraisal ==
Bai Juyi is considered one of the greatest Chinese poets, but even during the ninth century, sharp divide in critical opinions of his poetry already existed. While some poets like Pi Rixiu only had the highest praise for Bai Juyi, others were hostile, like Sikong Tu (司空圖) who described Bai as "overbearing in force, yet feeble in energy (qi), like domineering merchants in the market place." Bai's poetry was immensely popular in his own lifetime, but his popularity, his use of vernacular, the sensual delicacy of some of his poetry, led to criticism of him being "common" or "vulgar". In a tomb inscription for Li Kan (李戡), a critic of Bai, poet Du Mu wrote, couched in the words of Li Kan: "...It has bothered me that ever since the Yuanhe Reign we have had poems by Bai Juyi and Yuan Zhen whose sensual delicacy has defied the norms. Excepting gentlemen of mature strength and classical decorum, many have been ruined by them. They have circulated among the common people and been inscribed on walls; mothers and fathers teach them to sons and daughters orally, through winter's cold and summer's heat their lascivious phrases and overly familiar words have entered people's flesh and bone and cannot be gotten out. I have no position and cannot use the law to bring this under control."

Bai was also criticized for his "carelessness and repetitiveness", especially his later works. He was nevertheless placed by Tang poet Zhang Wei (張爲) in his Schematic of Masters and Followers Among the Poets (詩人主客圖) at the head of his first category: "extensive and grand civilizing power".

=== Modern assessment ===
Burton Watson says of Bai Juyi: "he worked to develop a style that was simple and easy to understand, and posterity has requited his efforts by making him one of the most well-loved and widely read of all Chinese poets, both in his native land and in the other countries of the East that participate in the appreciation of Chinese culture. He is also, thanks to the translations and biographical studies by Arthur Waley, one of the most accessible to English readers".

== In popular culture ==
Bai Juyi is one of the main characters of the 2017 Chinese fantasy film Legend of the Demon Cat, where he is portrayed by Huang Xuan. It the movie, the poet is solving a murder mystery and struggles to finish his famous poem, "Song of Everlasting Regret."

The American poet, Allen Ginsberg, wrote "Reading Bai Juyi" during his 1984 trip to China. The poem was written in Shanghai over the course of one day and the final section is a "transformation" (Ginsberg's description) of a poem by Bai.

== See also ==
- Li Shidao
- List of emperors of the Tang dynasty
- Salt in Chinese history#The moral debate over salt and society
- West Lake

== Works cited ==
- Hinsch, Bret. (1990). Passions of the Cut Sleeve. University of California Press.
- Hinton, David (2008). Classical Chinese Poetry: An Anthology. New York: Farrar, Straus, and Giroux. ISBN 0-374-10536-7 / ISBN 978-0-374-10536-5.
- Owen, Stephen (1996). An Anthology of Chinese Literature: Beginnings to 1911. New York: W.W. Norton. ISBN 0-393-97106-6.
- Owen, Stephen (2006). The Late Tang: Chinese Poetry of the Mid-Ninth Century (827-860). Harvard University Asia Center. pp. 45–. ISBN 978-0-674-03328-3.
- Kubin, Wolfgang (=Wolfgang Kubin, book review ), Weigui Fang, 'Den Kranich fragen. 155 Gedichte von Bai Juyi, in: ORIENTIERUNGEN. Zeitschrift zur Kultur Asiens (Journal sur la culture de l'Asie), n ° 1/2007, pp. 129–130.
- Nienhauser, William H (ed.). The Indiana Companion to Traditional Chinese Literature. Indiana University Press 1986. ISBN 0-253-32983-3
- Ueki, Hisayuki; Uno, Naoto; Matsubara, Akira (1999). "Shijin to Shi no Shōgai (Haku Kyoi)". In Matsuura, Tomohisa (ed.). Kanshi no Jiten 漢詩の事典 (in Japanese). Tokyo: Taishūkan Shoten. pp. 123–127. OCLC 41025662.
- Arthur Waley, The Life and Times of Po Chü-I, 772-846 A.D (New York,: Macmillan, 1949). 238p.
- Waley, Arthur (1941). Translations from the Chinese. New York: Alfred A. Knopf. ISBN 978-0-394-40464-6
- Watson, Burton (1971). Chinese Lyricism: Shih Poetry from the Second to the Twelfth Century. (New York: Columbia University Press). ISBN 0-231-03464-4
