= List of archives in Poland =

This is a list of archives in Poland.

== Central archives in Poland ==
- Archives of Modern Records
- Central Archives of Historical Records
- National Digital Archives

== Regional archives in Poland ==
- State Archives in Białystok
- State Archives in Bydgoszcz
- State Archives in Częstochowa
- State Archives in Gdańsk
- State Archives in Gorzów Wielkopolski
- State Archives in Kalisz
- State Archives in Katowice
- State Archives in Kielce
- State Archives in Koszalin
- National Archives in Kraków
- State Archives in Leszno
- State Archives in Lublin
- State Archives in Łódź
- State Archives in Malbork
- State Archives in Olsztyn
- State Archives in Opole
- State Archives in Piotrków Trybunalski
- State Archives in Płock
- State Archives in Poznań
- State Archives in Przemyśl
- State Archives in Radom
- State Archives in Rzeszów
- State Archives in Siedlce
- State Archives in Suwałki
- State Archives in Szczecin
- State Archives in Toruń
- State Archives in Warsaw
- State Archives in Wrocław
- State Archives in Zielona Góra

== See also ==
- Lists of archives
- List of national archives
- List of museums in Poland
- Culture of Poland
