= Kotzebue (noble family) =

Baltic German noble family

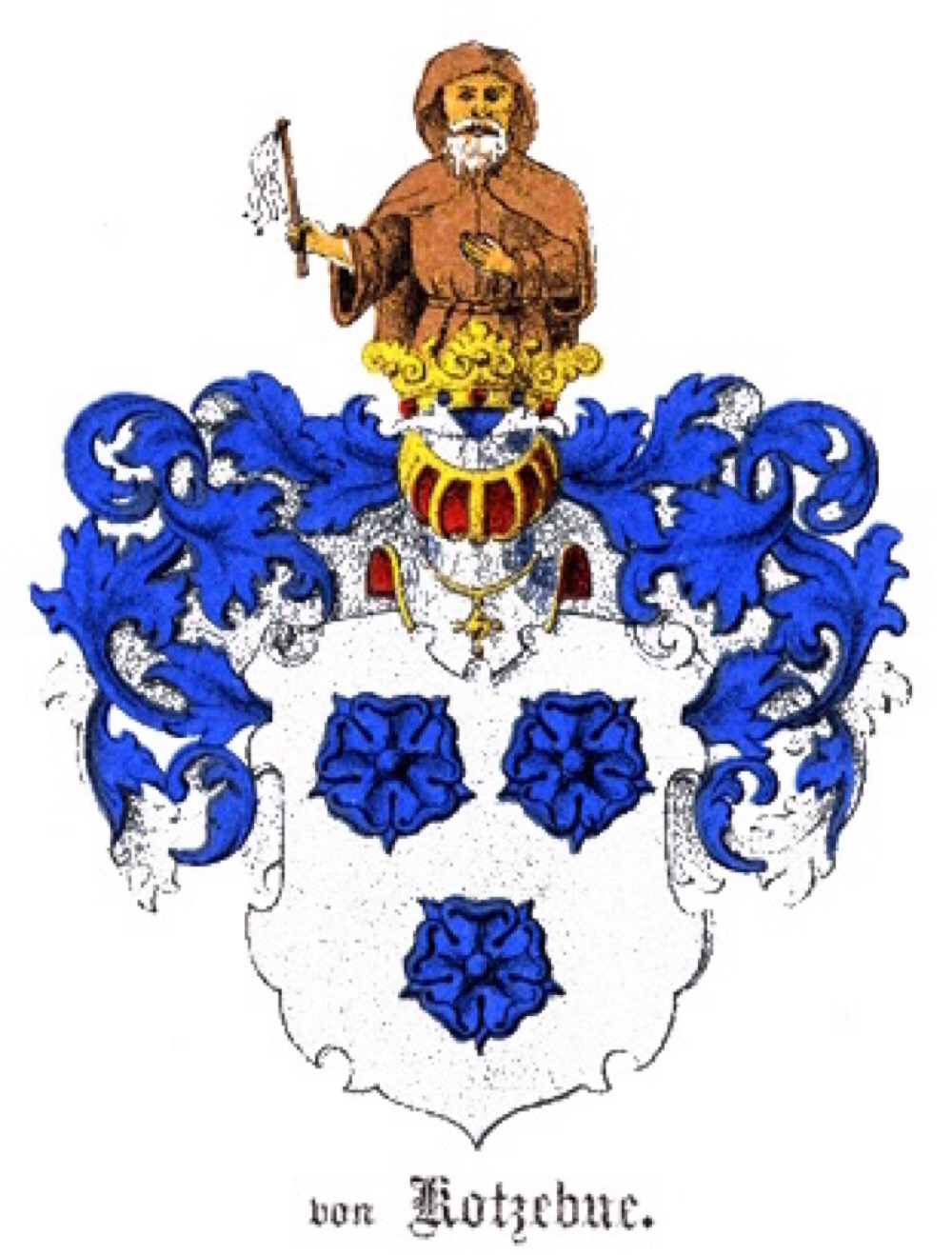
Coat of arms of the untitled Kotzebue family of 1786, in the Baltic Coat of arms book by Carl Arvid von Klingspor in 1882.

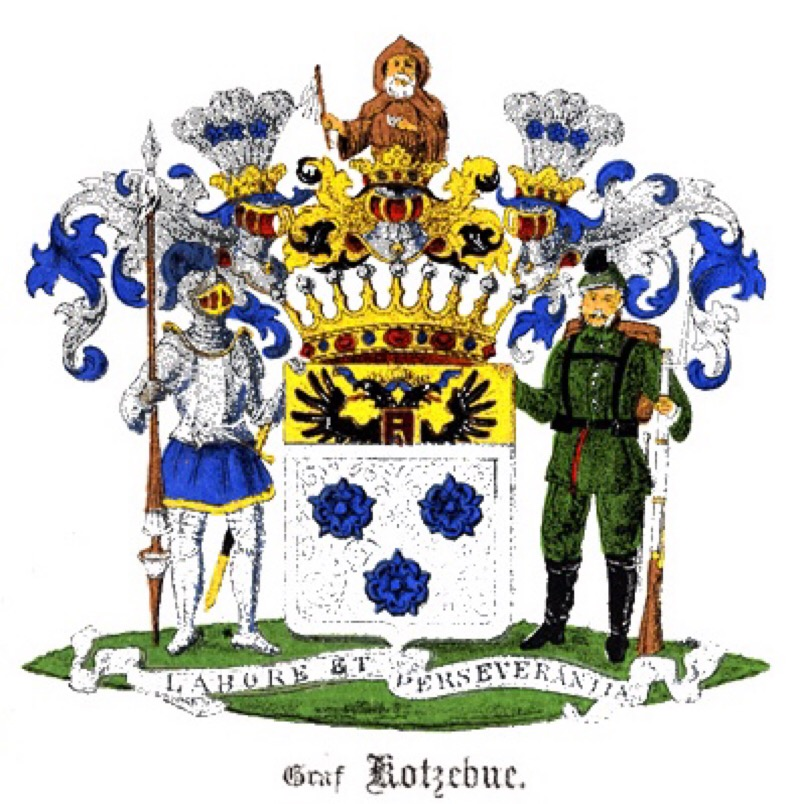
Coat of arms of the comital Kotzebue family of 1876, in the Baltic Coat of arms book by Carl Arvid von Klingspor in 1882.

The Kotzebue family (Note: The earlier spellings varies included Kossebu, Cassebu, Kotzebw and Kotzebuw. While the Russian spelling is Коцебу́, which is transliterated as Kotsebú.) is a German and Baltic German noble family of Brandenburgish descent, tracing its origin back to Kossebau in Altmark. They held nobility status in the Russian Empire and the Kingdom of Bavaria. The English name of the Alaskan Inuit city of Kotzebue, as well as the neighboring Kotzebue Sound, in the Alaskan Arctic take their names from Otto von Kotzebue, a Russian naval officer of this family.

== History ==
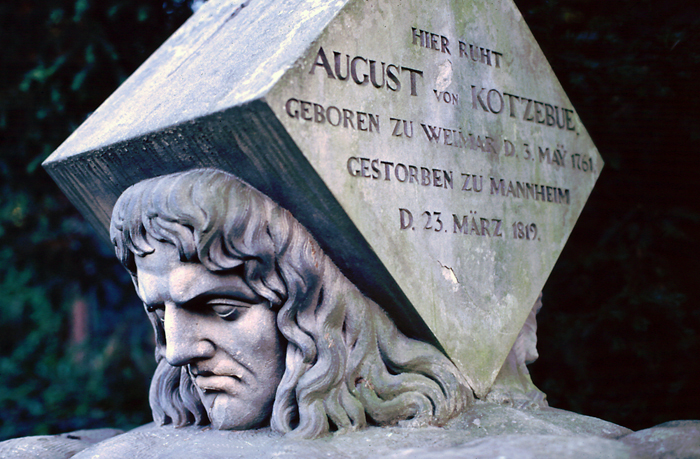
The grave of August von Kotzebue as of 2006

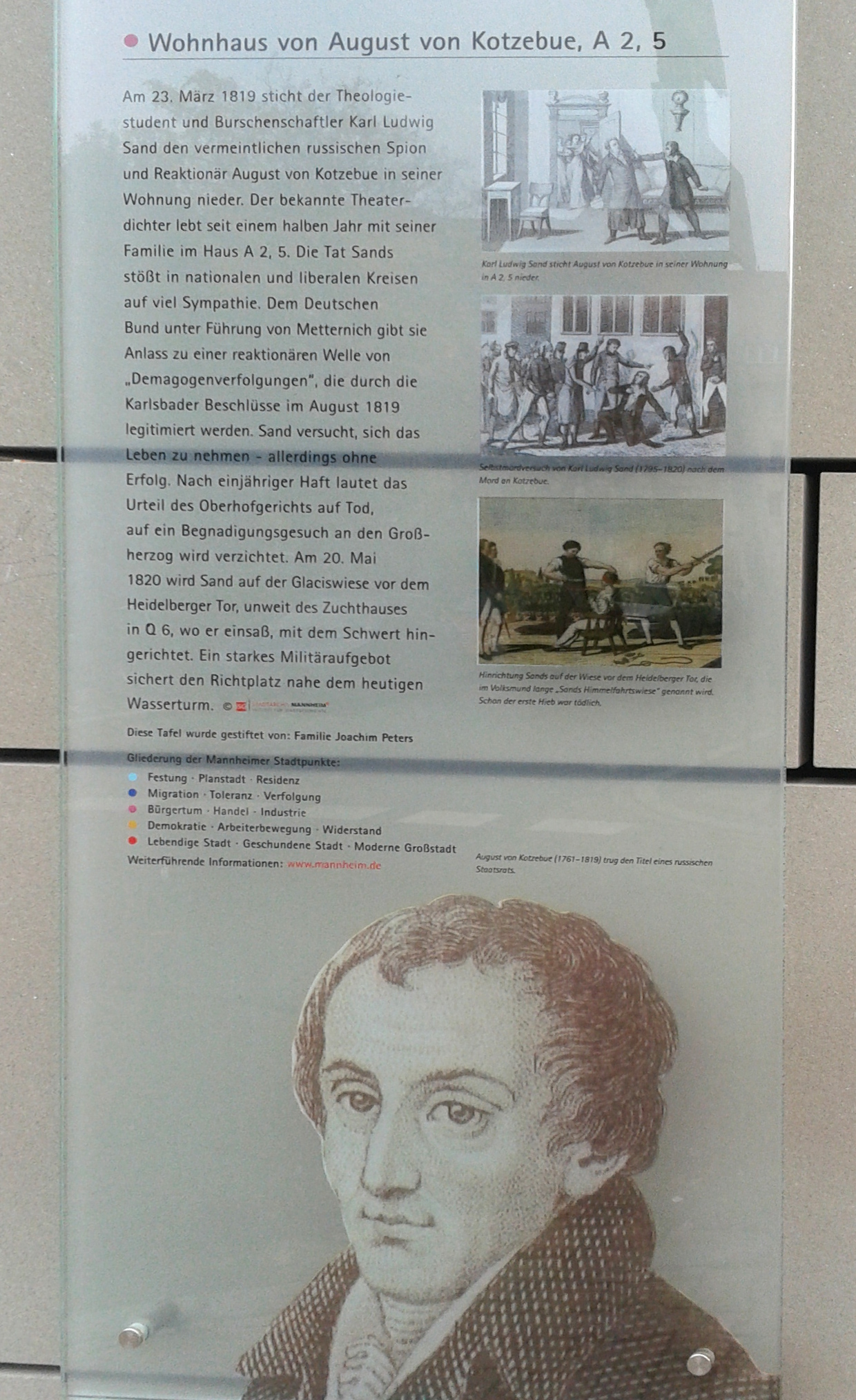
A plaque commemorates August von Kotzebue's residence in Mannheim

The Kotzebue family appears in historical documents as early as 1375. Early known members of the family include Henning Kossebu, a diplomat in Stendal in the Altmark, and Arnd Cassebu, a councillor in Salzwedel. The ancestor of the modern family was Jakob Kotzebue (died 1597), a citizen and council treasurer in Magdeburg. His son Johann (1591–1629) was a Lutheran theologian, rector in Quedlinburg and minister in St. Jakob's church de in Magdeburg. Johann's son of the same name was also a Lutheran theologian and an abbot in the Loccum Abbey.

The most famous and prominent member of the family, the world-famous playwright, writer and librettist August von Kotzebue (1761–1819), became renowned for his dramatic works; their politics drew the attention of many, including famous figures such as Beethoven and Goethe. He was ennobled into the hereditary Russian nobility in 1786. However, he also made a lot of enemies and became a much-hated man in the eyes of many Germans, with many seeing him as a reactionary and a spy. Karl Ludwig Sand assassinated August von Kotzebue in 1819; the murder gave Prince von Metternich the opportunity to issue the Carlsbad Decrees which imposed political restrictions in universities all over Germany.

August von Kotzebue worked as a consul general in Russia and Germany, and almost all his descendants entered Russian service. Some embarked on military careers, including the famous explorer Otto von Kotzebue (1787–1846), others included Moritz von Kotzebue (1789–1861)et and Paul Demetrius von Kotzebue (1801–1884), who became a Russian count in 1874. In 1878, Paul Demetrius's daughter, Countess Alexandrine Mathilde, married Theodor Kotzebue-Pilar von Pilchau; because Paul Demetrius did not have any male descendants, he chose Pilar von Pilchau to inherit the primogeniture, thus creating the joint family of Graf Kotzebue-Pilar von Pilchau.

Other family members also achieved prominence, such as the painter Alexander von Kotzebue (1815–1889), whose son Wilhelm (1864–1952) also painted; he became a member of the Bavarian nobility in 1906. Wilhelm Basilius von Kotzebue (1813–1887) became a Russian diplomat and writer.

== Genealogy ==
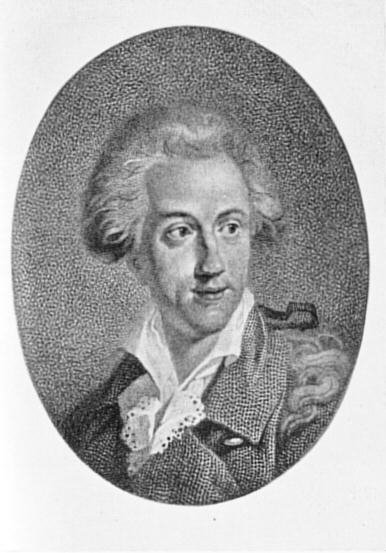
Portrait of August von Kotzbue in Weimar, c. 1802.

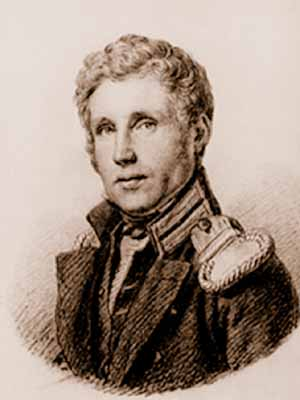
Portrait of Otto von Kotzebue, c. 1830.

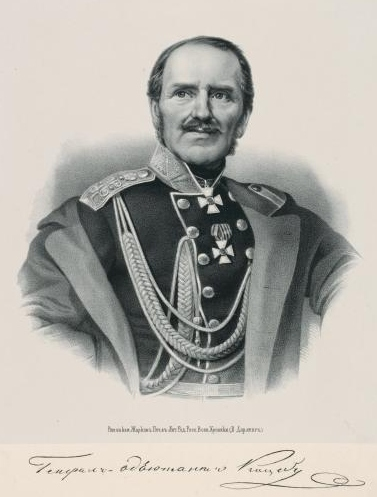
Paul Demetrius von Kotzebue, from the "Portraits of persons distinguished by their merits and commanding active units in the war of 1853-1856.", c. 1860.

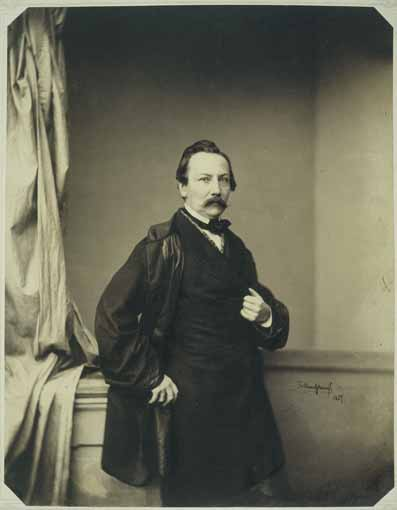
Alexander von Kotzebue, 1857.

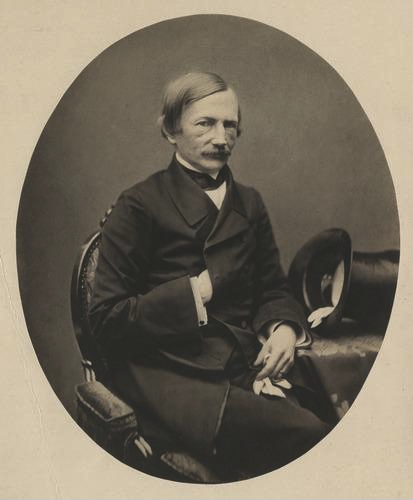
Wilhelm von Kotzebue, from the National Archives of Estonia, c. 1870.

=== Born before August von Kotzebue ===
- Jakob Kotzebue (died 1597), council treasurer in Stendal.
  - Johann Kotzebue (1591–1629), Lutheran theologian, rector in Quedlinburg and minister in St. Jakob's Church in Magdeburg.
    - Johann Kotzebue (1616–1677), Lutheran theologian, abbot in the Loccum Abbey.
      - Georg Carl Kotzebue (1668–1730), abbot in the Bursfelde Abbey from 1700 until his death in 1730.
    - Jakob Franz Kotzebue (1621–1685), physician, personal doctor in Sweden.
      - Christian Ludwig Kotzebue (1661–1706), historian and genealogist, personal of Elector Ernest Augustus of Hanover.
        - Johann Ludwig Kotzebue (1694–1730), businessman, Hanoverian commission councilor.
          - Lewin Karl Christian Kotzebue (1727–1761), legation council in the service of Duchess Anna Amalia of Brunswick-Wolfenbüttel.
            - August Ferdinand Friedrich von Kotzebue (1761–1819)
            - Johanne Karoline Amalie Kudecus (née Kotzebue; 1757–1844), author.

=== Descendants of August von Kotzebue ===
August von Kotzebue married three times and had a total of 18 children, of whom 1 son and 3 daughters died during childhood.

First in 1785, he married Friederike Julie Dorothea von Essen, the daughter of the commandant of the Reval Castle Lieutenant-General Reinhold Wilhelm von Essen, and his wife Baroness Anna Eleonora von von Saß. They had 4 children together:

- Wilhelm Friedrich "Fritz" (1785–1813), adjutant to Emperor Alexander I and chief of staff under Prince Peter zu Sayn-Wittgenstein during the First Battle of Polotsk, died during the battle.
- Otto (1787–1846), ⚭ Amalie Zoege von Manteuffel in 1818, naval captain, landowner, explorer, and scientist, famous for his participation in the First Russian circumnavigation under Adam Johann von Krusenstern and the exploration of Oceania.
- Moritz (1789–1861), ⚭ Helene von der Howen in 1817, lieutenant-general, author, and senator, along with his brother Otto, took part in the circumnavigation under Admiral von Krusenstern.
  - Dorothea (1824–1891), married to General Eduard Alexander von Brümmer.
- Karoline Friederike Helene (1790-?)

After Essen's death in 1790, Kotzebue's second marriage was with Christine Gertrude von Krusenstern, daughter of Karl Adolf von Krusenstiern and Anna Magdalena von Brümmer, the cousin of the famous explorer Adam Johann von Krusenstern, they had children together:

- Amalie "Emmy" Sophie Friedrike (1795-?)
- Elisabette "Betty" Emilie (1797–1866)
- August Julius (1799–1876), ⚭ Baroness Emma Charlotte von Stempel, major-general.
- Paul Demetrius (1801–1884), ⚭ Countess Wilhelmine Elisabeth "Elisa" von Manteuffel, General of the Infantry, participant of the Crimean War, Governor-General of Novorossiysk-Bessarabia, commander of the Odessa Military District from 1862 to 1874, Governor-General of Warsaw and commander of the Warsaw Military District from 1874 to 1880, granted the title of Count in 1876.
  - Alexandra Mathilde (1849–1884), ⚭ Theodor Pilar von Pilchau in 1878, Pilar von Pilchau inherited the comital title and created the Graf Kotzebue-Pilar von Pilchau family due to Paul Demetrius not having any male descendants.

In 1805, August von Kotzebue was married for the third time to Wilhelmine Friederike von Krusenstiern. After his second wife's death in 1804, Krusenstiern was the daughter of officer Otto Wilhelm von Krusenstiern and Friederike Marie Ulrich, she was another cousin of Adam Johann von Krusenstern. She and Kotzebue had 8 children, of whom 2 died during childhood:

- Karl "Charles" Ferdinand Konstantin Woldemar (1805–1896), ⚭ Baroness Molly Friedrike Elisabeth von Koskull in 1833, diplomat, director of the Special Chancellery during the Siege of Sevastopol.
  - Ernst Paul (1838–1914), ⚭ Pauline Mavros, second ⚭ Alexandra Konstantinovna Ilyinskaya, diplomat, Russian ambassador to the Baden, Saxe-Coburg and Gotha from 1892 to 1895, and to the United States from 1895 to 1897.
    - Paul (1865–1947), ⚭ Maria Rallis in 1895, second ⚭ Lydia Nikolayevna Sukhanova, major-general.
- Friedrich Wilhelm (1808–1880), advisor to the state.
- Georg (1810–1875), ⚭ Hedwig Charlotte Eveline Staël von Holstein in 1843, major-general.
- Wilhelmine Friederike (1812–1851), ⚭ cousin and son of Adam Johann von Krusenstern Paul Theodor in 1832.
- Wilhelm (1813–1887), ⚭ Princess Aspasie Cantacuzino, diplomat, Russian ambassador to Saxony and Saxe-Altenburg from 1869 to 1878 and to Switzerland from 1878 to 1879.
- Alexander Friedrich Wilhelm Franz (1815–1889), ⚭ Charlotte Emilie Johanna von Krusenstern in 1845, war and history painter, cousin and niece of Adam Johann von Krusenstern, member of Krusenstern noble family
  - Wilhelm Johannes Adolph (1864–1952), ⚭ Elise Weber (1869-1954), painter, incorporated into Bavarian nobility in 1906.
- Eduard (1819–1852), ⚭ Margarethe Haenschel (1822-1885), worked in the Russian Ministry of National Education.

== Properties ==
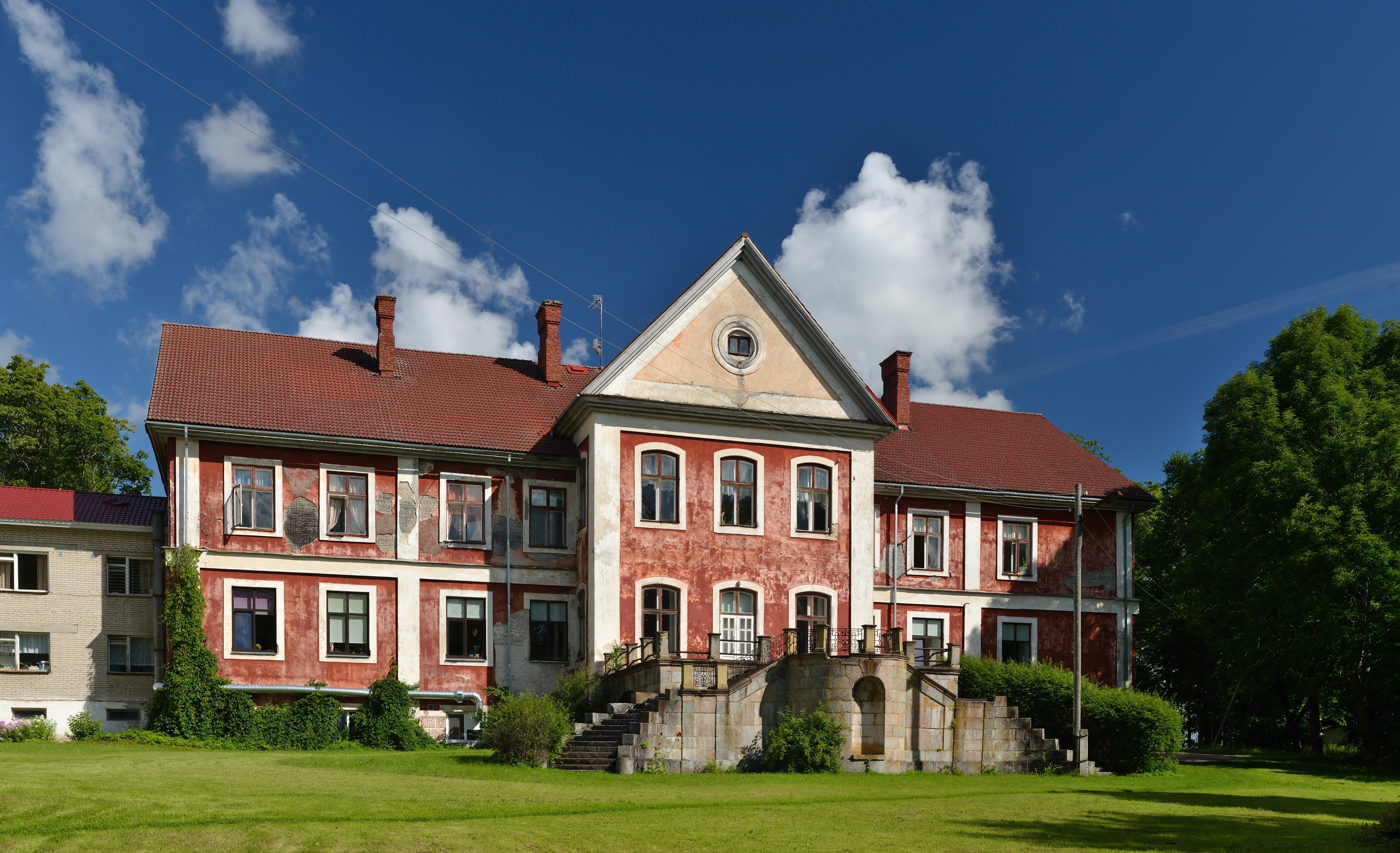
The Meks Manor in 2012.

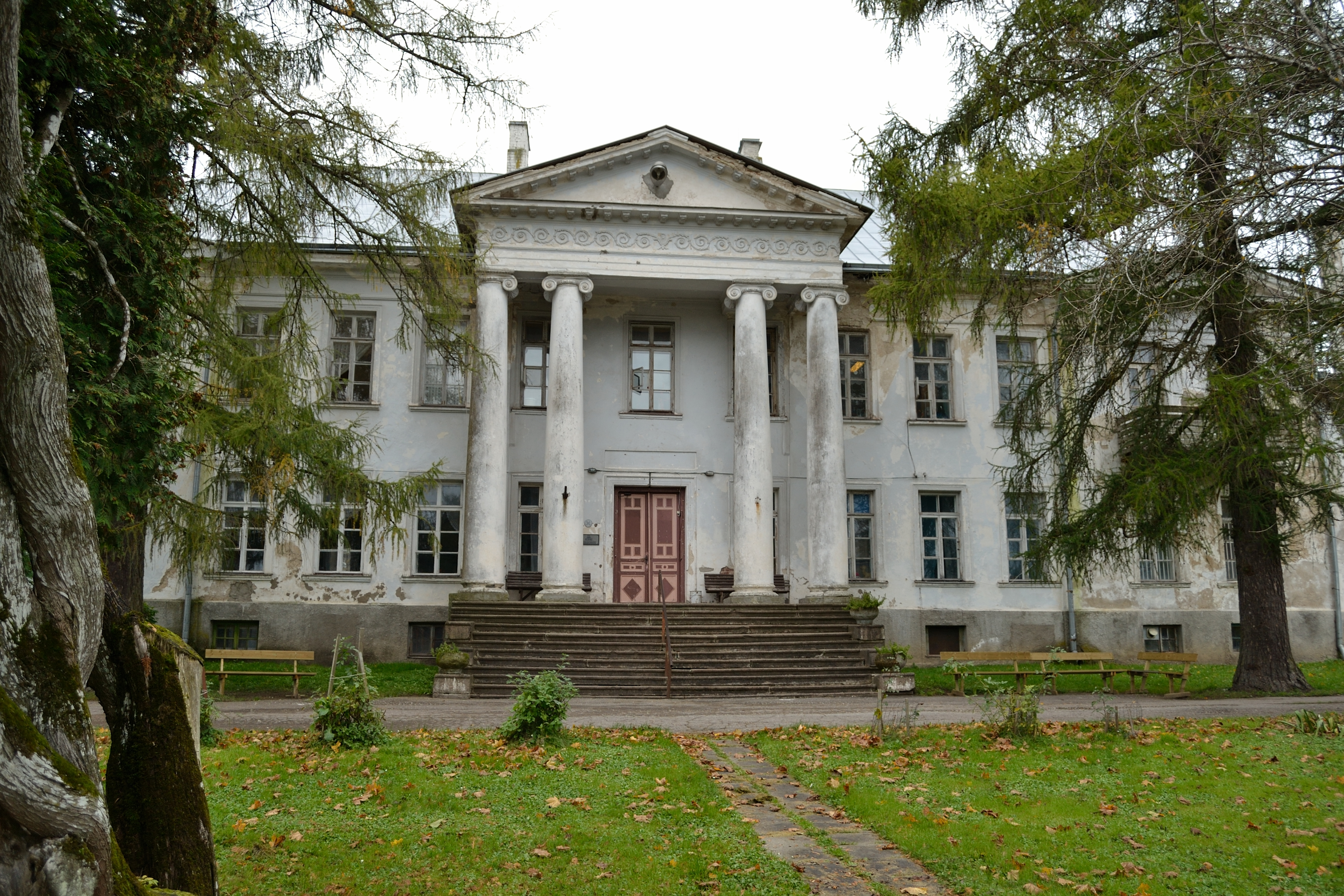
The Kirna Manor in 2011.

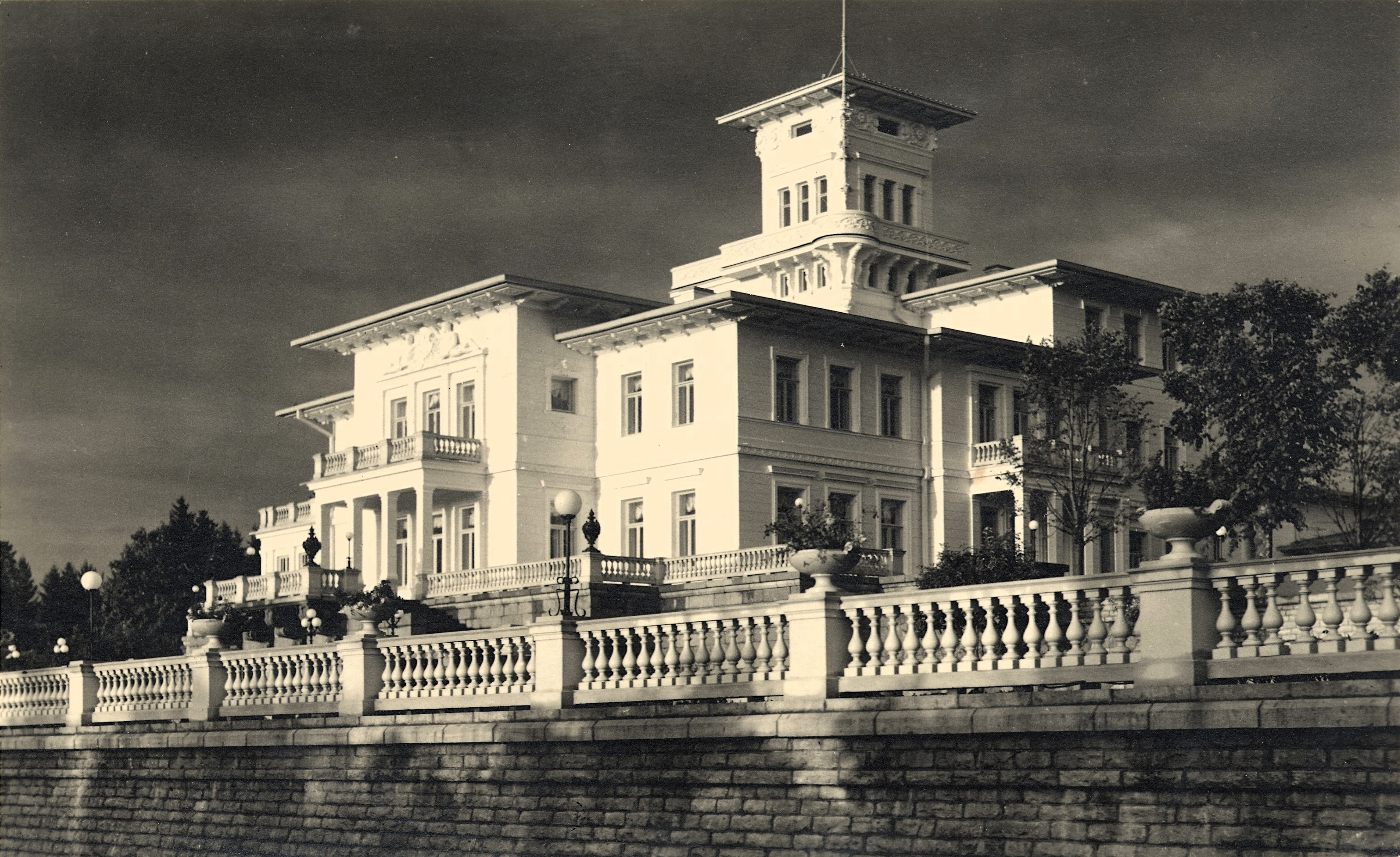
The Orrenhof Manor during the 1930s, now destroyed.

The Kotzebues were not as big landowners as other Baltic families like the Wrangels and the Rennenkampffs, but they did own several manor houses in the Baltics, mostly located in the Governorate of Estonia:

- Kau Manor (Kõue)
- Kirna Manor (Kernu)
- Meks Manor (Ravila)
- Schwarzen Manor (Vardi)
- Orrenhof Manor (Oru)
- Parkhof Manor (Pargi)
- Pallfer Manor (Palvere)

== Coat of arms ==
The coat of arms of the untitled Kotzebue family of 1786, according to the Genealogical Handbook of the Baltic Knighthoods, Part Estonia by Baron Otto Magnus von Stackelberg:

The shield showed 3 roses. Crest: over the crown a white-bearded monk standing in a brown robe, holding a scourge in his raised right hand. Mantling: blue-silver.

== Sources ==
- Stackelberg, Otto Magnus (1930). "Genealogische Handbuch der baltischen Ritterschaften, Teil Estland, Band I, seite 147–154 (Genealogical Handbook of the Baltic Knighthood, Part Estonia, Band III, page 147-154)". personen.digitale-sammlungen.de. Starke Verlag, Görlitz.
- Hohenlohe-Schillingsfürst, Franz Josef (1982). "Genealogisches Handbuch des in Bayern immatrikulierten Adels, Band XIV, seite 666 (Genealogical handbook of the nobility enrolled in Bavaria, Band XIV, page 666)". Starke Verlag, Görlitz.
- Klingspor, Carl Arvid (1882). "Baltisches Wappenbuch Wappen sämmtlicher, den Ritterschaften von Livland, Estland, Kurland und Oesel zugehörigen Adelsgeschlechter, seite 87 und 164 (The coat of arms of the coat of arms is the coat of arms belonging to the knighthoods of Livonia, Estonia, Courland and Oesel, page 87 and 164)". personen.digitale-sammlungen.de. Stockholm.
- "Deutschbaltisches Biographisches Lexikon, seite 409–411 (Baltic German Biographical Dictionary, page 409-411)". bbld.de. Buchhandlung v. Hirschheydt, Wedemark. 1998.
