= National Archives in Kraków =

State archive in Krakow, Poland

- Polish: Archiwum Narodowe w Krakowie

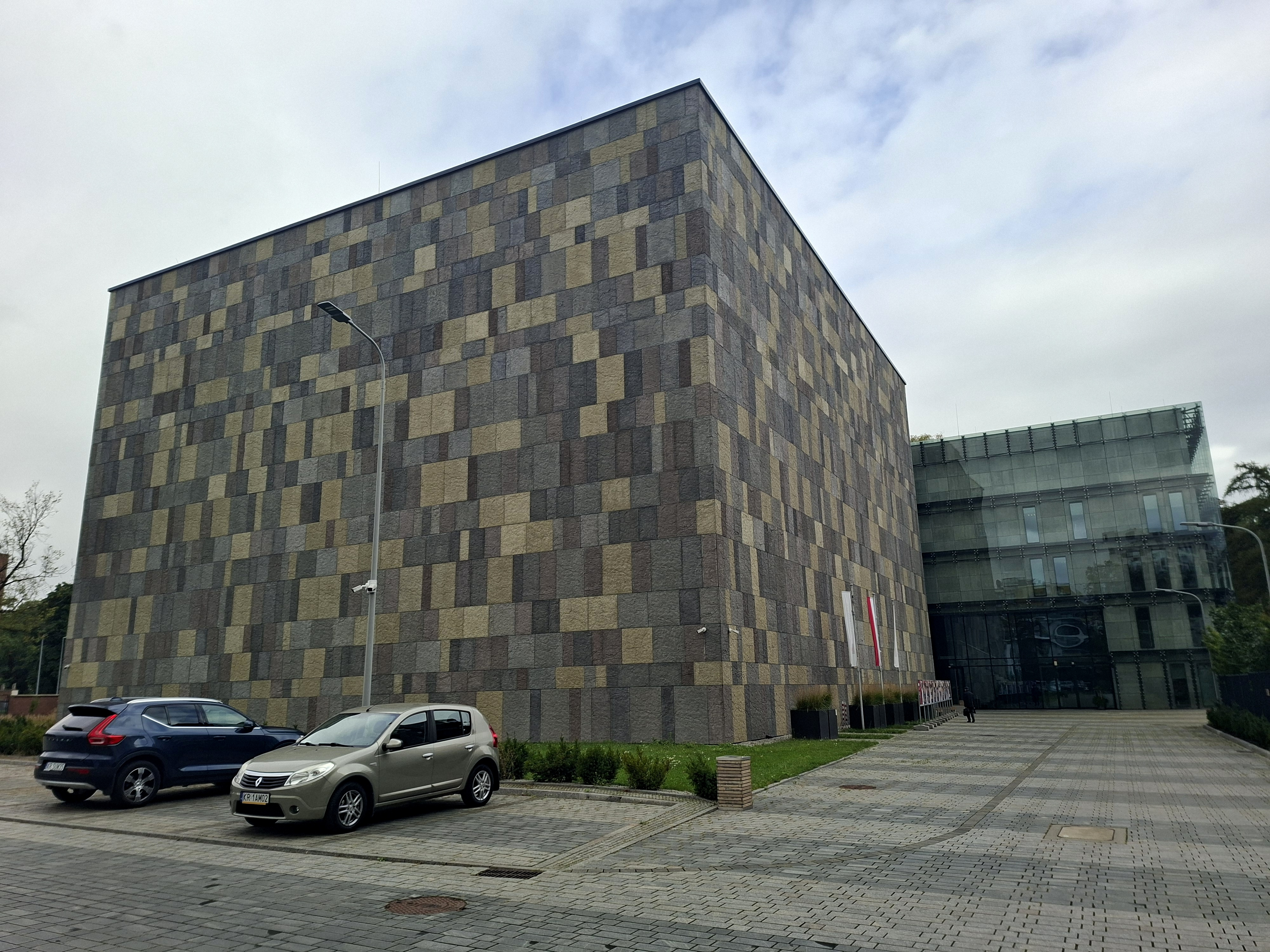
- Headquarters of the National Archives at 22E Rakowicka Street

State Archive overview
- Formed: September 2, 1878
- Type: Central Government Agency
- Jurisdiction: Poland
- Headquarters: Rakowicka 22E, 31-510 Kraków, Poland; 50°04′20″N 19°57′08.5″E
- State Archive executive: Wojciech Krawczuk, Director
- Website: https://ank.gov.pl

The National Archives in Krakow (Polish: Archiwum Narodowe w Krakowie, ANK) is a state archive in Krakow established in 1878; it has used its current name since 2012.

== History ==
The National Archives in Krakow began its institutional history on September 2, 1878 with the establishment of the National Archives of Municipal and Land Records in Krakow. The Archives is organized not only with the protection of records remaining from civil offices and courts from previous centuries in mind, but also for their use in science and to make them more accessible for a wider audience.

There was also the idea of creating town archives, finalized by a resolution of the Krakow Town Council on June 2, 1887 to establish the Krakow Town Archives of Former Records with its headquarters.

In 1951, as a result of a reorganization of the network of archives, supervision of the town archives was taken over by the General Director of the State Archives who then joined it, on 1 February 1952, to The State Archives in Krakow.

For the following decades, the Archives worked as: from 1952 the Regional State Archives in Krakow, from 1957 the State Archives of the Town of Krakow and Krakow Region, from 1976 the Regional State Archives in Krakow and from 1984 as The State Archives in Krakow.

In appreciation of the collected archival resources and the work of a few generations of archival workers, the Minister of Culture and National Heritage on 29th of December 2012 raised the level of the Krakow institution and changed it into the National Archives in Krakow.

== See also ==
- Central Archives of Historical Records
- Archives of Modern Records
- National Digital Archives
