= Manteuffel =

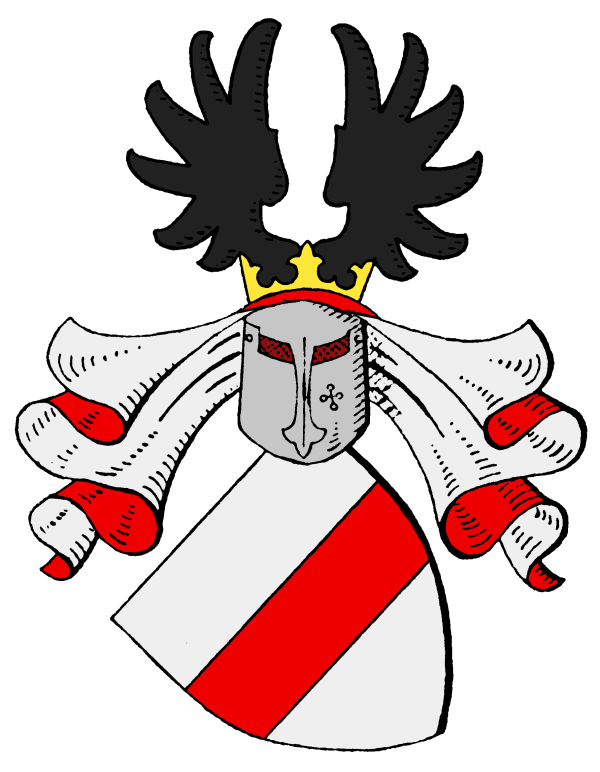
Coat of arms of Manteuffel

The Manteuffel family is an old and influential German noble family, originating in the Duchy of Pomerania, which later also resided in Brandenburg, Prussia, Silesia, Mecklenburg, Poland, the Baltics and in Russia.

== Name of the family ==
The surname Manteuffel is a combination of the German words for a man of knightly condition (man) and devil (teufel). Originally it was a surname denoting a person inclined to violent and criminal acts.

== History ==
The Manteuffel family was first mentioned in 1256 in the person of John I Manteuffel, who was a landed lord of Taglim (Anklam) in the service of Duke Barnim I. His son Henricus Manduvel, who is first mentioned on November 14, 1287, started the German line of the family, which was one of the oldest and most distinguished in the region of Westphalia. On March 10, 1709, the family was raised to the title of Baron, then in 1719 they were raised to the hereditary title of Count. On August 25, 1790, the family received the title of Imperial Count from Charles Theodore, Elector of Bavaria as an Imperial vicar.

His second son, unknown by name, started the second Pomeranian line of the family, which divided into more than a dozen lines. Another line moved as late as the 13th century to what is now Estonia, then a Danish province. By the 17th century, they bore the surname Soie, Soye, Zoege, Zoge, Szoege or, in a polonized form, Sey. At the beginning of the 17th century, there was a realization of common ancestry with the Pomeranian Manteuffels and the adoption of the surname in the form of Manteuffel-Szoege. During the Polish-Swedish War, a representative of the family, Andrew Manteuffel-Szoege, entered Polish service, as a result of which he lost his estates in Estonia and settled in Courland. His descendants belonged to the Polish-Livonian nobility and by the 19th century had become completely Polonized.

== Notable family members ==
- Edwin Freiherr von Manteuffel (1809–1885), Prussian Generalfeldmarschall in the Franco-Prussian War.
- Fritz Manteuffel (1875–1941), German gymnast
- Hans Manteuffel (1879-1963), architect
- Hans-Wilhelm Doering-Manteuffel (1898–1963), general in the Luftwaffe of Nazi Germany during World War II
- Hasso von Manteuffel (1897–1978), German general and politician
- Heinrich von Manteuffel (1696–1798), Prussian Lieutenant General in Wars of Frederick the Great
- Karl Otto von Manteuffel (1806-1879), German politician, prussian agriculture minister
- Otto Karl Gottlob von Manteuffel (1844-1913), German politician, member of German Reichstag
- Count Ernst Andreas Ernestovich von Manteuffel (1873-1953), Russian nobleman who had an affair with Aurora Demidova and caused her divorce from Prince Arsen of Yugoslavia.
- Count Arvid Victor Clemens Ernestovich von Manteuffel (1879-1930), Russian nobleman who famously killed Nicholas Yusupov in a dispute over his wife in 1908
- Otto Theodor von Manteuffel (1805–1882), Prussian Prime Minister
- Sabine Doering-Manteuffel (born 1957), German ethnologist
- Wanda Zawidzka-Manteuffel (1906–1994), Polish graphic artist

== Members of the family Zoege von Manteuffel or Manteuffel-Szoege ==
- Edward Manteuffel-Szoege (1908-1940), Polish artist
- Felix von Manteuffel or Friedrich Karl Baron von Manteuffel-Szoege (born 1945), German actor
- Georg von Manteuffel-Szoege (1889–1962), politician
- Gustaw Manteuffel (1831 – 1916), historian
- Kurt Zoege von Manteuffel (1881–1941), Baltic German art historian
- Leon Manteuffel-Szoege (1904–1973), Polish surgeon
- Tadeusz Manteuffel or Tadeusz Manteuffel-Szoege (1902–1970), Polish historian
- Werner Zoege von Manteuffel (1857–1926), medical surgeon

== Bibliography ==
- Manteuffel-Szoege, Ryszard (1989). "Szkica autobiograficzny" (PDF). Kwartalnik Historii Nauki i Techniki. 34 (4): 745–776.
- Świrko, Andrzej (2008). Szlakiem dawnych rodów pomorskich (in Polish). ISBN 978-83-751802-3-7.
