= State Archives in Gdańsk =

State archive in Gdańsk, Poland

Coordinates: 54.357806°N 18.648222°E

- Archiwum Państwowe w Gdańsku

Non-ministerial government department overview
- Formed: April 1, 1901
- Jurisdiction: Poland
- Headquarters: Gdańsk, Poland
- Non-ministerial government department executive: Piotr Wierzbicki, director
- Website: gdansk.ap.gov.pl

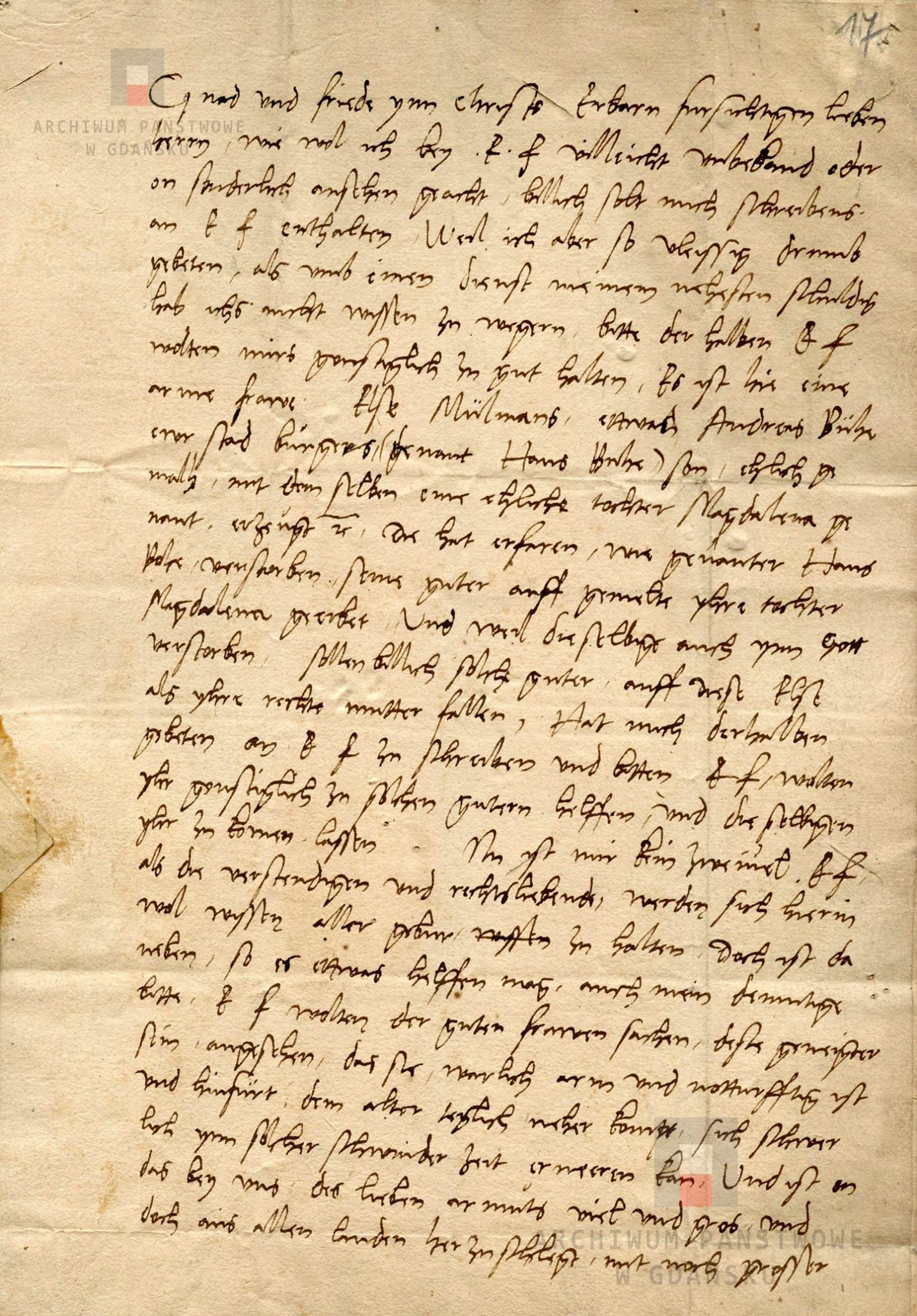
An example document from the archive: Martin Luther writes to city council in Gdańsk (1532)

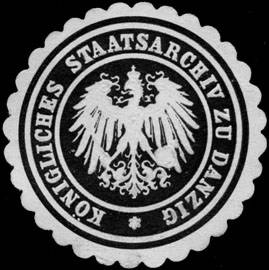
Seal of the archive (stamp, 1910)

State Archives in Gdańsk (Polish: Archiwum Państwowe w Gdańsku, AP) is one of Poland's regional state archives. The archive in the city of Gdańsk (German: Danzig) was founded under Prussian jurisdiction in 1901. The headquarters is located at Wałowa 5 Street in Gdańsk. The office in Gdynia is located at Handlowa 11 Street.

From 1920 to 1939, it has been the National Archives of the Free City of Danzig (German: Staatsarchiv der Freien Stadt Danzig).

== History ==
The archive was created in the years 1899 to 1901. The archives of the city of Danzig had been taken over. Records concerning West Prussia had been transferred from the state archives in Königsberg, East Prussia. The archives opened on April 1, 1901 and on February 14, 1903 in an own building. In October 1901 Max Bär became director, who introduced "Bär's Principle". Adolf Warschauer (1855–1930) took over the lead from Bär in 1912, he became the first jew who was director of a Prussian state archive.

A portion of 20 percent of the records was destroyed during World War II in 1945, 30 percent had been damaged. A larger portion of the remaining records had been transferred from Germany and Soviet Union in the years 1947 to 1965. A branch was opened in Gdynia in 1997.

=== Official names ===
The archive went through several name changes under different jurisdictions:

- Royal State Archives for West Prussia in Danzig (German: Königliches Staatsarchiv für Westpreußen in Danzig) (1901–1918, German Empire)
- National Archives of the Free City of Danzig (German: Staatsarchiv der Freien Stadt Danzig (1920–1939, Free City of Danzig)
- Imperial Archives Danzig (German: Reichsarchiv Danzig) (1940–1945, German Reich)
- State Archives (Polish: Archiwum Państwowe) (1945–1952, Republic of Poland)
- Voivodeship State Archives in Gdańsk (Polish: Wojewódzkie Archiwum Państwowe w Gdańsku (1952–1983, Polish People's Republic)
- State Archives in Gdańsk (Polish: Archiwum Państwowe w Gdańsku (1983–1989, Polish People's Republic)
- State Archives in Gdańsk (Polish: Archiwum Państwowe w Gdańsku (from 1989, Third Republic of Poland)

=== Archive Directors ===
- Otto Meinardus (1901, acting)
- Max Bär (1901–1912)
- Adolf Warschauer (1912–1919)
- Karl Joseph Kaufmann (1919–1929)
- Walther Recke (1929–1941)
- Ulrich Wendland (1941–1945)
- Marcin Dragan (1945–1961)
- Roch Morcinek (1961–1968)
- Maria Sławoszewska (1968–1969)
- Czesław Biernat (1969–1991)
- Aniela Przywuska (1991–2003)
- Piotr Wierzbicki (from 2003)

== See also ==
- National Archives of Poland
