= Marienehe Charterhouse =

Carthusian monastery

Coordinates: 54°06′40″N 12°05′15″E

Marienehe Charterhouse, also sometimes referred to as Rostock Charterhouse (German: Kartause Marienehe, Kartause Himmelszinnen or Kartause Rostock), was a Carthusian monastery, or charterhouse, in Marienehe, now a suburb of Rostock in Mecklenburg-Vorpommern, Germany.

The estate of Marienehe was bought in 1393 by the Rostock merchant and statesman Winold Baggel or Baggele, who in 1396 (629 years ago), when he was Bürgermeister of Rostock, together with his father-in-law, Matthias von Borken, founded the charterhouse here. The monastery was noted for the extent to which it favoured university education for its monks and the mystical writings the community produced, particularly under the priors Heinrich Eler, Vicco Dessin and Heinrich von Ribnitz.

The community, under the leadership of Marquardt or Markwart (von) Behr, the last prior, vehemently resisted the imposition of Lutheranism during the Reformation and the monastery had to be dissolved forcibly by 300 armed men on 15 March 1552 (473 years ago), after which it was demolished and used as a quarry. The stone was mostly put to use in the construction of Schloss Güstrow.

There are no visible remains. The site was later used for the construction of the Heinkel works, and after the war for the Rostock Fischkombinat ("fishery centre"). A block of flats now stands here.

== Sources and external links ==
- Lorenz, Sönke, Potkowski, Edward, Schlegel, Gerhard et al., 2002: Bücher, Bibliotheken und Schriftkultur der Kartäuser: Festgabe zum 65. Geburtstag von Edward Potkowski. Franz Steiner Verlag ISBN 3-515-08093-7 available at googlebooks.co.uk (in German)
- Schlegel, Gerhard: Die vergessene Kartause Marienehe bei Rostock (1396–1552). Analecta Cartusiana 116/4, 1989, pp. 119–151 (in German)
- Nordisk tidskrift för bok- och biblioteksväsen / Årg. XXII. 1935 /151 Projekt Runeberg (in Norwegian)
