= Józef Siemieński =

Polish historian (1882–1941)

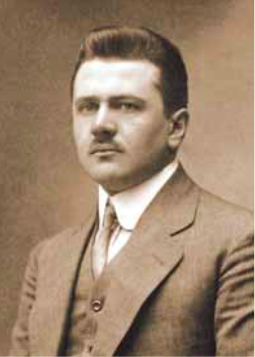
Józef Siemieński

Józef Siemieński (born 2 March 1882 in Skrzydłów near Radomsko – 14 October 1941 in Auschwitz) was a Polish archivist, historian of law.

Siemieński was from 1925 until 1939 director of the Central Archives of Historical Records (AGAD) in Warsaw and professor at the Jagiellonian University since 1938.

He was arrested by the Gestapo and murdered in the German concentration camp Auschwitz.

== Works ==
- Ustrój Rzeczypospolitej Polskiej (1915)
- Polska kultura polityczna wieku XVI w. (Kultura staropolska) (1932)
- Polskie zbiory rękopiśmienne przed wojną, podczas wojny i po wojnie (1941)
