= State Archives in Bydgoszcz =

Regional branch of the State Archives of Poland

Coordinates: 53.1241°N 18.0257°E

State Archive in Bydgoszcz

General information
- Location: 17 Mieczysława Karłowicza Street, Bydgoszcz
- Owner: State Archives of Poland

Website
- bydgoszcz.ap.gov.pl

The State Archive in Bydgoszcz (Polish: Archiwum Państwowe w Bydgoszczy) is a regional branch of the State Archives of Poland. It serves the Kuyavian‑Pomeranian Voivodeship and formerly covered the Bydgoszcz Voivodeship (1975–1998). Its current headquarters is located at 17 Mieczysława Karłowicza Street in Bydgoszcz.

== History ==
The archive was founded in early 1906, following the dissolution of the Prussian General Commission for the Provinces of Posen and West Prussia (Königliche Ansiedlungskommission) in Bydgoszcz, assuming custody of land‑reform and administrative records from West and East Prussia and the Province of Posen.

From 1920 to 1923, the records were administered by the Land Office in Poznań. In 1924, the Bydgoszcz branch officially became part of the State Archive in Poznań. In 1938, it was elevated to regional archive status with jurisdiction over the Pomeranian Voivodeship.

During World War II, German authorities converted it into a branch of the Reichsarchiv in Gdańsk, extending its holdings to include pre‑war Polish institutions such as the Voivodeship Office, Curatorium of Pomeranian School District, and the Provincial Police Command.

From 1945 until 1947, the branch returned under Poznań's administration; from 1950, it served the Bydgoszcz Voivodeship. Following the 1998 reform, it has jurisdiction over the current Kuyavian‑Pomeranian administrative region.

=== Directors ===
- 1918–1927 – Mieczysław Białynia‑Rzepecki
- 1927–1939 & 1945–1952 – Tadeusz Esman
- 1952–1953 – Czesław Skopowski
- 1953–1967 – Józef Augustyn
- 1967–1980 – Franciszek Fedorowicz
- 1980–1982 – Anna Perlińska
- 1982–2004 – Janusz Kutta
- 2005–present – Eugeniusz Borodij

== Collections ==
The archive holds over 10 km of documents (over 1.2 million archival units), including records from:

- War‑Domain Chamber of Bydgoszcz (1772–1806)
- Bydgoszcz Department records (1808–1815)
- Regency offices of Bydgoszcz and Inowrocław (1815–1919, 1939–1945)
- Pomeranian Voivodeship Offices in Toruń and Bydgoszcz (1920–1950)
- Presidium of the Provincial National Council (1950–1973)
- Municipal and county administration archives across Bydgoszcz, Chojnice, Sępólno, Szubin, Świecie, Tuchola, Wyrzysk, and other towns

The earliest preserved document dates from 18 June 1179—a papal bull by Alexander III concerning the monastery in Mogilno. The cartographic collection includes nearly 11,000 maps, the oldest being a 1774 city plan by Julius Greth.

== Headquarters ==
Until 2023 the archive operated from an eclectic 19th-century tenement at Dworcowa 65, built for the Wulff shipyard owners and later used by the Prussian General Commission. A commemorative plaque honors archivist Zygmunt Malewski (1875–1937).

Construction of the new headquarters at Karłowicza 17 began in 2021; the ceremonial cornerstone was laid on 4 July 2022. The modern facility opened on 25 September 2023.

The postmodern four-storey building has approximately 8,478 m^{2} of gross area (7,525 m^{2} usable, 3,854 m^{2} storage, 23,500 m^{2} volume). It accommodates about 30 km of records (up from ~11 km) and features a ventilated concrete façade, photovoltaic shading, rainwater retention, energy-efficient lighting, climate‑controlled vaults, fumigation chamber, mobile shelving, digitization and conservation labs, conferencing and exhibition spaces (50 seats), and full accessibility. The investment was fully financed by the Ministry of Culture, with a budget around 80 million PLN. Contractors included Skala Sp. z o.o. (architect), Proj‑Przem‑Projekt (design), and Budimex S.A. (general contractor).

== Publications and outreach ==
Staff of the archive have led local publishing initiatives, such as Bydgoski Słownik Biograficzny (multiple volumes, over 700 biographies) and research on urban chancelleries in Greater Poland. These were promoted through exhibitions, symposia, and community outreach.

In November 2024, the archive celebrated its 100-year anniversary with events attended by national archival leadership, regional officials, and archive staff. The archive was awarded both the Medal Unitas Durat Cuiaviano‑Pomeraniensis and a medal from the city president of Bydgoszcz. It maintains over 1.2 million archival units (12 km of records).
