= Tadeusz Manteuffel =

Polish historian

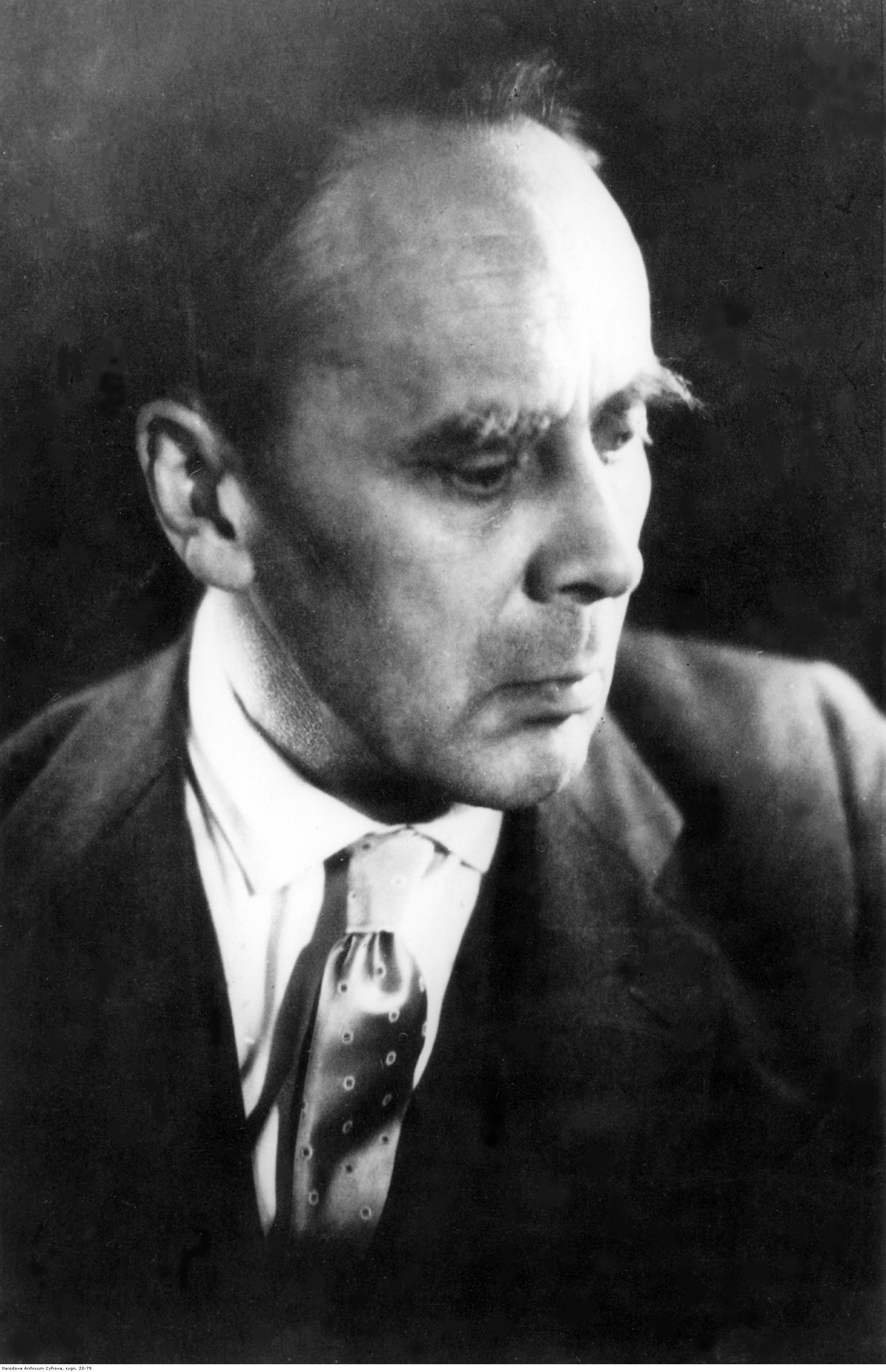
- Born: Tadeusz Manteuffel; March 5, 1902; Rezhitsa, Vitebsk Governorate, Russian Empire
- Died: September 22, 1970 (aged 68); Warsaw, Warsaw Voivodeship, Polish People's Republic
- Other name: Tadeusz Manteuffel-Szoege
- Occupation: historian

Tadeusz Manteuffel or Tadeusz Manteuffel-Szoege (1902–1970) was a Polish historian of Baltic German origin, specializing in the medieval history of Europe.

Manteuffel was born in what was then Rezhitsa, Vitebsk Governorate, Russian Empire. His brothers were Leon Manteuffel-Szoege and Edward Manteuffel-Szoege. He lost his right hand in the Polish-Soviet War in 1920 when he took part in the defence of Warsaw. Manteuffel studied medieval history in Poland, France, and Italy and later taught at Warsaw University, becoming a known medievalist before 1939.

During the Second World War, Manteuffel was an activist in the education and information section (Biuro Informacji i Propagandy Armii Krajowej) of the Polish Secret State in German-occupied Poland, where he contributed to and edited underground newspapers and leaflets (Wiadomości Polskie) and from 1940 to 1944 he organized underground history seminars in the then-outlawed Warsaw University.

After the war, Manteuffel was active in rebuilding Warsaw University, where he organized the History Institute and its library. In 1950-53 he directed the Polish Historical Society, and he co-founded the Polish Academy of Sciences, creating and directing its Institute of History, later named for him.

== Works ==
A student and friend of Marceli Handelsman, Manteuffel dedicated his life to history as a student, teacher, scholar and activist. He advocated the creation and clarification of historian code of ethics, warned about the dangers of misinterpreting and falsifications of history. He specialized in the Medieval history of Europe, political history, history of social movements and cultural structures.

Manteuffel authored many articles and books, including Narodziny herezji (The Birth of Heresy) and Historia Powszechna. Średniowiecze (Universal History: The Medieval Period), Polska w okresie prawa książęcego 963-1194 (The Formation of the Polish State: The Period of Ducal Rule, 963–1194).

Among his students were Edward Potkowski, and Jerzy Kolendo.

== See also ==
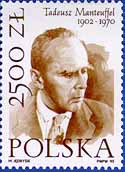
Polish 2,500-złoty postage stamp issued 1992, commemorating the 90th anniversary of Tadeusz Manteuffel's birth.

- List of Poles
