= Friedrich Philippi (historian) =

German historian and archivist

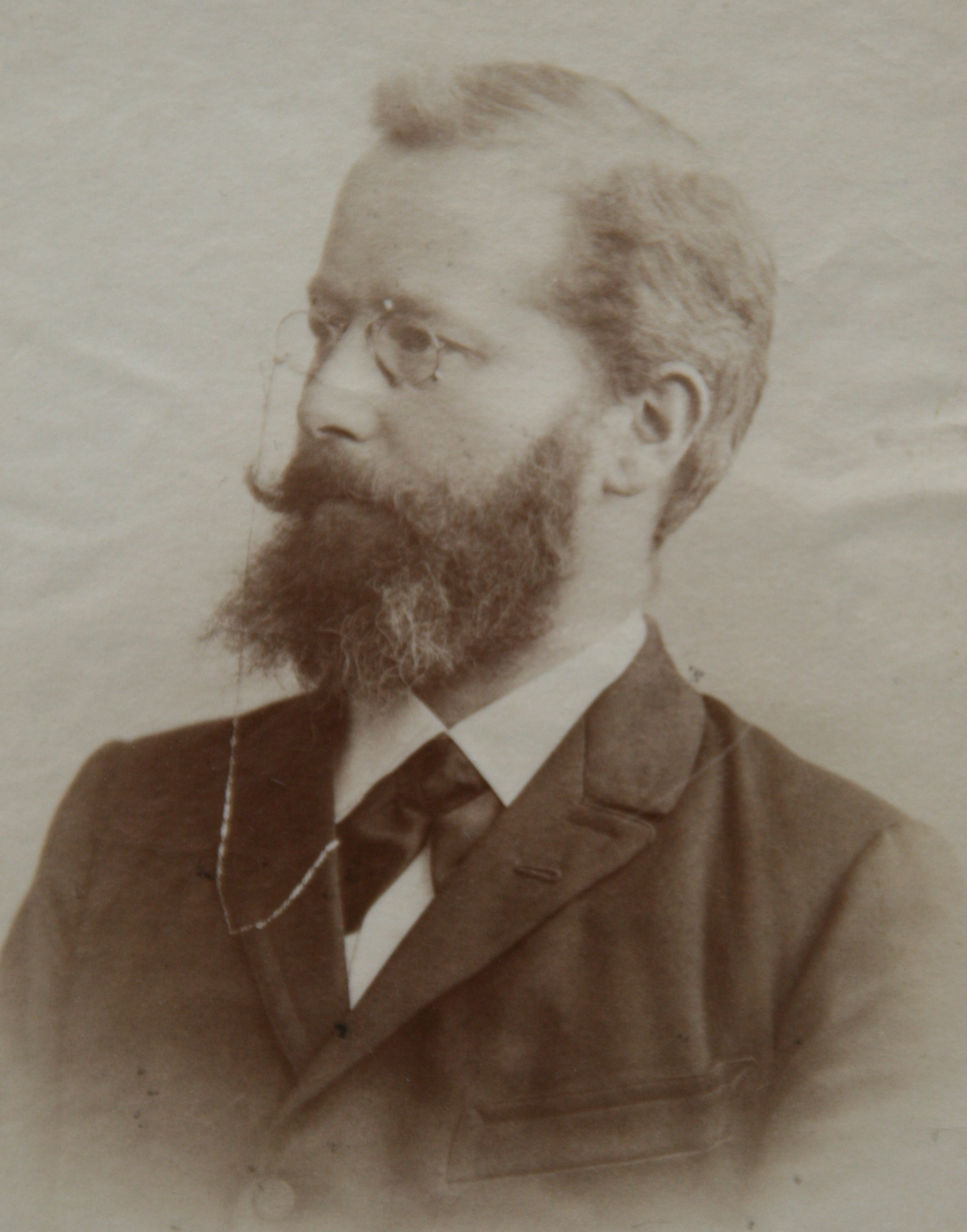
Friedrich Philippi

Gustav Friedrich Dettmar Philippi (14 July 1853, in Elberfeld – 26 April 1930, in Münster) was a German archivist and historian.

He studied philology at the University of Bonn, receiving his doctorate in 1876 with a dissertation on the Tabula Peutingeriana. Following graduation, he worked as an archivist at the state archives in Münster. In 1888, he was appointed head of the state archives in Osnabrück and, in 1897, returned to Münster as director of the archives.

He served as chairman of the Historical Commission for Westphalia and was an honorary professor at the University of Münster. He was also in charge of the archaeological excavation at Haltern.

== Selected works ==
- Das westfälische Vemegericht und seine Stellung in der deutschen Rechtsgeschichte, 1888 – The Westphalian Vehmic court and its position in German legal history.
- Die Chroniken des Mittelalters (with Hermann Forst, 1891) – The chronicles of the Middle Ages.
- Zur Verfassungsgeschichte der Westfälischen Bischofsstädte, 1894 – On the constitutional history of the Westphalian bishop cities.
- Osnabrücker Urkundenbuch (with Max Bär; 1896–1902) – Osnabrück register.
- Zur Osnabrücker Verfassungsgeschichte, 1897 – Osnabrück constitutional history.
- Der westfälische Friede, 1898 – The Peace of Westphalia.
- Historisches und Topographisches über die Umgebung Halterns (with Theodor Ilgen, 1901) – History and topography concerning the environs of Haltern.
- 100 Jahre Preußischer Herrschaft im Münsterlande, 1904 – 100 years of Prussian rule in Münsterland.
- Siegel, 1914 (documents and seals)
- Einführung in die Urkundenlehre des deutschen Mittelalters, 1920 – Introduction to the German Middle Ages.
- Geschichte Westfalens, 1926 – History of Westphalia.

He was also the author of several biographies in the Allgemeine Deutsche Biographie.
