= Leon Manteuffel-Szoege =

Polish surgeon

Leon Edward Manteuffel-Szoege
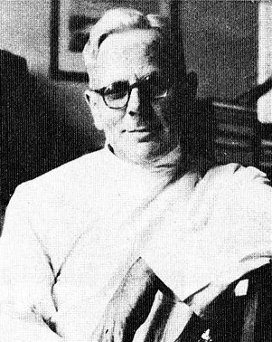
- Born: May 5, 1904; Rezhitsa, Vitebsk Governorate, Russian Empire
- Died: March 26, 1973 (aged 68); Warsaw, Polish People's Republic
- Education: University of Warsaw
- Occupation: Surgeon
- Known for: Pioneer of thoracic and cardiac surgery in Poland
- Relatives: Tadeusz Manteuffel (brother); Edward Manteuffel-Szoege (brother)
- Medical career
- Profession: Doctor of Medicine
- Field: Surgery
- Institutions: University of Warsaw
- Sub-specialties: Thoracic surgery; cardiac surgery
- Awards: Doctorate Honoris Causa (Jagiellonian University, 1964)

Leon Edward Manteuffel-Szoege (born 5 May 1904 in Rezhitsa, d. 1973 in Warsaw) was a Polish surgeon.

His brothers were Tadeusz Manteuffel and Edward Manteuffel-Szoege. He graduated from the Warsaw University under the supervision of Zygmunt Radliński. During the II World War he worked in conspiracy under the pseudonym "Krab" (literally Crab). For the whole German occupation he worked in clinic. Manteuffel-Szoege was one of three physicians who survived the Wola massacre.

After World War II, he continued his medical practice. In 1947, he performed a successful operation, the first in Poland, to resect a lung due to cancer. In 1953, he performed Poland's first operation for left venous stenosis. In 1964, he received a Doctorate Honoris Causa from the Jagiellonian University. He was a member of many foreign scientific societies, including the French National Academy of Surgery.

== Publications ==
- Reflections on the mechanical function of the heart, Manteuffel-Szoege L., Kardiol. Pol. 1973;16(5):391-8 (pl), PMID 4764019
- Some hemodynamic problems of extracorporeal circulation perfusion in relation to the hemodynamics of physiological circulation, Manteuffel-Szoege L., Kardiol Pol. 1973;16(5):385–90 (pl), PMID 4764018
- Paradoxes of hemodynamics (II), Manteuffel-Szoege L., Kardiol. Pol. 1971;14(1):39–48 (pl) PMID 5552710
- Paradoxes in hemodynamics (I), Manteuffel-Szoege L., Kardiol. Pol. 1971;14(1):33–8 (pl) PMID 5552709
- The Chalubiński legend? Manteuffel-Szoege L., Arch. Hist. Med. (Warszawa). 1971;34(1):33–9 (pl), PMID 4928614
- Mitral commissurotomy. Results in 1700 cases, Manteuffel-Szoege L., Nowicki J, Wasniewska M, Sitkowski W, Turski C., J. Cardiovasc. Surg. (Torino), 1970 Sep-Oct;11(5):350–4, PMID 5493249
- In memoriam: Docent Dr. med. Zbigniew Woźniewski (1914–1969), Manteuffel-Szoege L., Gruźlica 1970 Sep;38(9):945–9 (pl), PMID 4919665
- Morphology of blood flow in blood vessels. Preliminary report, Manteuffel-Szoege L., Pol. Med. J. 1970;9(2):315–21, PMID 5422800
- Zbigniew Woźniewski (1914–1969), Manteuffel-Szoege L., Arch. Hist. Med. (Warszawa), 1970;33(2):247–60, Polish. PMID 4925431
- Professor dr med. Stefania Chodkowska (4.8.1897–16.9.1969), Manteuffel-Szoege L., Gruźlica, 1970;38(8):860–3 (pl), PMID 4918140
- Morphology of the blood flowin the blood vessels. First research results, Manteuffel-Szoege L., Thoraxchir. Vask. Chir. 1969 Dec;17(6):557–63 (de), PMID 5275433
- Morphology of blood circulation in blood vessels. Preliminary studies, Manteuffel-Szoege L., Pol. Arch. Med. Wewn. 1969 Jun;42(6):845–52 (pl), PMID 5806670
- Remarks on blood flow. (The problem of the specific haemodynamic properties of blood, Manteuffel-Szoege L., J Cardiovasc Surg (Torino) 1969 Jan-Feb;10(1):22–30, PMID 5775106
- Surgical treatment of tetralogy of fallot. Diagnosis, indications, surgery selection and results of operative treatment, Manteuffel-Szoege L., Waśniewska M., Kardiol. Pol. 1967;10(2):69–79 (pl), PMID 6078241
- On the possibility of blood circulation continuing after stopping the heart, Manteuffel-Szoege L., Michałowski J., Grundman J., Pacocha W., J Cardiovasc Surg (Torino). 1966 May-Jun;7(3):201–8, PMID 5938806
- Dr Edward Zieliński (1861–1921), Manteuffel-Szoege L., Arch. Hist. Med. (Warszawa), 1966;29(1):43–66 (pl), PMID 5330459
- An attempt to analyze hemodynamic changes during the use of extracorporeal circulation, Michałowski J., Manteuffel-Szoege L., Pol. Tyg. Lek. 1965 Jul 19;20(29):1094–5 (pl), PMID 5843165
- Paradoxical hemodynemic phenomena, Manteuffel-Szoege L., Pol. Tyg. Lek. 1965 Jun 28;20(26):948–50 (pl), PMID 5839362
- On mechanisms for circulatory arrest and restoration under various clinical and experimental conditions, Manteuffel-Szoege L., Pol. Przegl. Chir. 1964 Mar;36:325–33 (pl), PMID 14178220
- Clinical thought and clinical thinking (attempted characterization of the problem from the surgical point of view, Manteuffel-Szoege L., Pol. Przegl. Chir. 1964 Mar;36:261–6 (pl), PMID 14178213
- On stopping and restarting of circulation in deep hypothermia, Manteuffel-Szoege L., J. Cardiovasc Surg (Torino), 1964 Jan-Feb;5:76–80, PMID 14109836
- Haemodynamic disturbances in normo and hypothermia with excluded heart and during acute heart muscle failure, Manteuffel-Szoege L., J. Cardiovasc. Surg. (Torino), 1963 Aug;4:551–5, PMID 14058369
- The problem of blood circulation in normo- and hypothermia, Manteuffel-Szoege L., Cas. Lek. Cesk. 1962 Jun 8;101:718-21, (pl), PMID 14058369
- Some new aspects about the haemodynamics of deep hypothermia, Manteuffel-Szoege L., Ann. Chir. Thorac. Cardiovasc. 1962 Apr;1:571, PMID 14469461
- Observations On Hemodynamics In Moderate And Deep Hypothermia, Manteuffel-Szoege L., Nowicki J., Michalowski J., Grundman J., Turski C., Pacocha W., Sitkowski W., Szaginski W., Pol. Przegl. Chir. 1961 Nov;33:1273–83 (pl), PMID 14469460
- A new view on the hemodynamics of deep hypothermia (role and significance of the "supplementary circulatory energy factor"), Manteuffel-Szoege L., Pol. Tyg. Lek. 1961 Sep 4;16:1412–3 (pl), PMID 14469462
- Sources of motor energy of the blood (contribution to the problem of blood circulation in hypothermia), Manteuffel-Szoege L., Cas. Lek. Cesk. 1961 Jun 23;100:740–2 (cs), PMID 13766329
- Surgical therapy of aortic stenosis co-existing with mitral stenosis, Manteuffel-Szoege L., Waśniewska-Zielinska M., Pol. Tyg. Lek. 1961 Feb 27;16:321–5 (pl), PMID 13766327
- Clinical use of Crafoord-Senning's apparatus for extra-corporeal circulation, Nowicki J., Justyna M., Michałowski J., Sitkowski W. Jr, Serafin R., Szagiński W., Pacocha W., Turski C., Manteuffel-Szoege L., Pol. Przegl. Chir. 1961;33:1040–3 (pl), PMID 14480650
- Experience with heart surgery with the use of extracorporeal circulation, Sitkowski W. Jr, Justyna M., Michałowski J., Waśniewska M., Warda B., Grundman J., Nowicki J., Manteuffel-Szoege L., Pol. Przegl. Chir. 1961;33:1044–7 (pl), PMID 13913500
- Problem of the source of energy in blood circulation, Manteuffel-Szoege L., Pol. Przegl. Chir. 1960 Aug-Sep;32:835–45 (pl), PMID 13766328
- Remarks on energy sources of blood circulation, Manteuffel-Szoege L., Turski C., Grundman J., Bull. Soc. Int. Chir. 1960 Aug;19:371–4, PMID 13766326
- Energy sources of blood circulation and the mechanical action of the heart, Manteuffel-Szoege L., Thorax. 1960 Mar;15:47–53, PMID 14420776
- Influence of the lowering of temperature on blood viscosity and on the work of the circulatory system, Manteuffel-Szoege L., Sitkowski W. Jr, Maczeński S., Minerva Cardioangiol. Eur. 1959 Jul-Sep;7:256–61 (fr), PMID 14420775
- Manteuffel-Szoege L., Sitkowski W. Jr, Minerva Med. 1958 Jul 4;49(53):2617–20 (it), PMID 13577539
- Nature of mechanical functions of the heart; The heart works like a hydraulic ram, Manteuffel-Szoege L., Gonta T., Minerva Cardioangiol. 1958 Apr-Jun;4(2):261–7 (fr), PMID 13565460
- Essay on the clarification of mechanical function of the heart; Battering ram-like function of the heart, Manteuffel-Szoege L., Gonta T., Pol. Tyg. Lek. (Warszawa). 1957 Jul 1;12(27):1048–52 (pl), PMID 13465433
- Resection of the lung tissue in the treatment of pulmonary tuberculosis; Surgical technic and results, Manteuffel-Szoege L., Gruźlica 1956 Aug;24(8):775–84 (pl), PMID 13397812
- Colostomy of the upper stomach, Manteuffel-Szoege L., Sitkowski W., Zentralbl. Chir.1956;81(33a):1463–7 (de), PMID 13393425
- Plastic surgery of the upper part of the stomach with a portion of the large intestine, Manteuffel-Szoege L., Sitkowski W Jr, Pol. Tyg. Lek. (Warszawa), 1955 Dec 19;10(51):1653–5 (pl), PMID 13310309
- Surgical treatment of constrictive pericarditis; Ten case reports, Manteuffel-Szoege L., Waśniewska M., Kardiol. Pol. 1954;1(1-2):7–17 (pl), PMID 13272284
- Results of surgical treatment of diseases of esophagus and gastric cardia, Manteuffel-Szoege L., Koszarowski T., Wiechno W., Pol. Tyg. Lek. (Warszawa), 1952 Aug 25;7(33–34):1008-14, PMID 13026540
- 100 Cases of pulmonary resection, Manteuffel-Szoege L., Koszarowski T., Justyna M., Nowicki J., Wiechno W., Gruźlica 1952 Mar-Apr;20(2):202–6, PMID 14937412
- Bronchial adenomas and their treatment, Manteuffel-Szoege L., Gruźlica. 1952 Jan-Feb;20(1): 37–46, PMID 14937396
- Mechanism of healing of tuberculous cavity, Manteuffel-Szoege L., Gruźlica. 1951, Mar-Apr;19(2):153–63, PMID 14880004
- Surgical diathermy in the treatment of maxillary cancer, Manteuffel-Szoege L., Koszarowski T., Pol. Tyg. Lek. (Warszawa), 1951 Feb 12;6(7):193–202, PMID 14864132
