= Edward Potkowski =

Polish historian

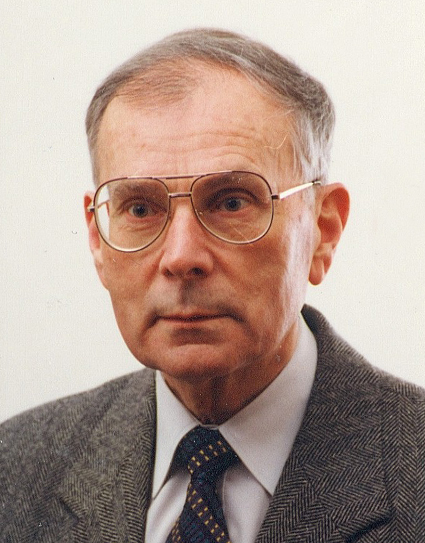
- Portrait of Potkowski, 2012
- Born: May 10, 1934 (age 92); Rybnik, Silesian Voivodeship, Second Polish Republic
- Died: July 31, 2017 (aged 83); Warsaw, Masovian Voivodeship, Third Polish Republic
- Resting place: Powązki Military Cemetery
- Occupation: Historian
- Board member of: Central Archives of Historical Records
- Spouse: Zofia Cep

Academic background
- Education: University of Warsaw
- Thesis: (1967)
- Doctoral advisor: Tadeusz Manteuffel

Academic work
- Discipline: History
- Sub-discipline: Medievalist
- Main interests: Codicology and palaeography

Edward Potkowski (10 May 1934 in Rybnik - 31 July 2017) was a Polish historian. His specialization includes history of the medieval period and paleography.

Edward Potkowski was born on 10 May 1934 in Rybnik. In 1954 he enrolled at the Uniwersytet Wrocławski, but since 1955 he had been studied on the Warsaw University. He graduated in 1960. Potkowski gained PhD in 1967. His supervisor was Tadeusz Manteuffel. In 1979 he passed his habilitation. From 1981 to 1986 he was a director of Central Archives of Historical Records.

In 1989 he gained the title of professor.

In 1960 he married Zofia Cep.

== Publications ==
- Książka rękopiśmienna w kulturze Polski średniowiecznej (1984).
- Le Livre manuscrit – la société – la culture dans la Pologne du bas moyen âge (XIVe-XVe s.) (1997).
- Książka i pismo w średniowieczu. Studia z dziejów kultury piśmiennej i komunikacji społecznej (2006).
- Dziedzictwo wierzeń pogańskich w średniowiecznych Niemczech. Defuncti vivi (1973).
- Crécy - Orlean 1346-1429 (1986)
- Warna 1444 (1990)
- Grunwald 1410 (1994)
- Zakony rycerskie (1995, 2005).
- Heretycy i inkwizytorzy (2012).
