= Max Bär =

German archivist and historian

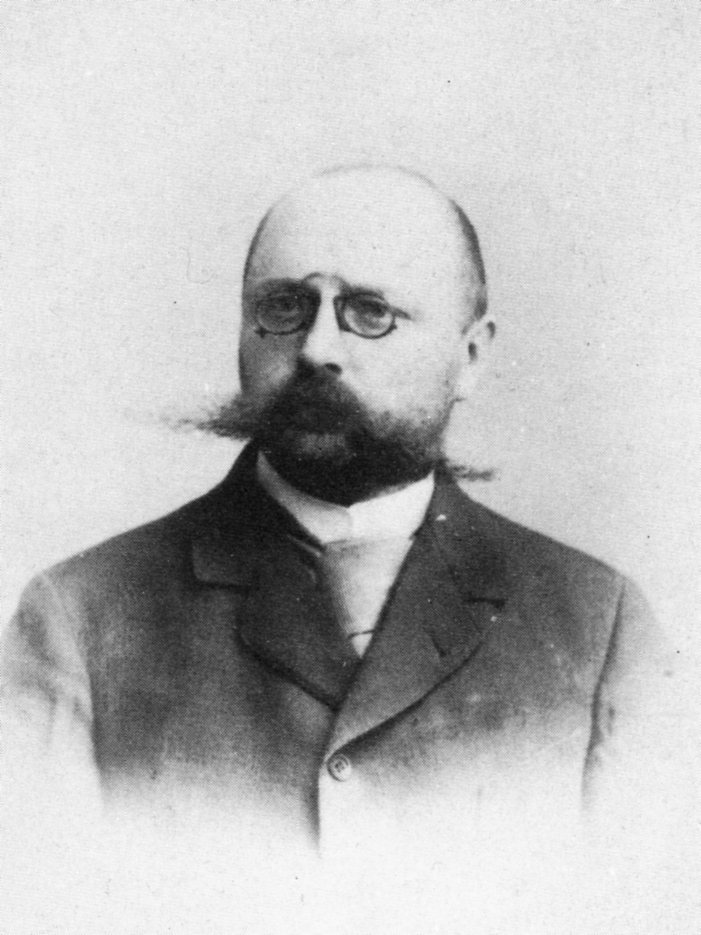

Max Bär (21 October 1855, in Groß-Tzschacksdorf – 16 May 1928, in Koblenz) was a German archivist and historian.

He studied history and philology at the University of Leipzig, and received his doctorate in 1880 at the University of Jena. Afterward graduation, he worked for the Prussian archive administration in Posen, Koblenz, Stettin and Hanover. In 1897 he was named acting director at the state archives in Osnabrück, and later on, served as head of the state archives in Danzig (from 1901) and Koblenz (from 1912).

He is credited with introducing an archival method known as Bär'sches Prinzip ("Bär's Principle"). He was the author of several biographies in the Allgemeine Deutsche Biographie.

== Selected works ==
- Der Koblenzer Mauerbau. Rechnungen 1276–1289, (as editor, 1888).
- Osnabrücker Urkundenbuch (with Friedrich Philippi, 1892–1902) – Osnabrück register.
- Leitfaden für Archivbenutzer, (1896) – Guide for archive users.
- Die Politik Pommerns während des Dreissigjährigen Krieges, (1896) – The politics of Pomerania during the Thirty Years' War.
- Urkunden und Akten zur Geschichte der Verfassung und Verwaltung der Stadt Koblenz bis zum Jahre 1500, (1898) – Documents and files on the history of the constitution and administration of the city of Koblenz up until the year 1500.
- Die Behördenverfassung der Rheinprovinz seit 1815, (1898) – The administrative constitution of the Rhine Province since 1815.
- Geschichte des Königlichen Staatsarchivs zu Hannover, (1900) – History of the Royal State Archives in Hanover.
- Westpreussen unter Friedrich dem Grossen, (1909) – West Prussia under Friedrich the Great.
- Bücherkunde zur Geschichte der Rheinlande, (1920) – Bibliography on the history of the Rhineland.
