= Mavros =

Greek islet in the Aegean Sea

Native name: Μαύρος
- Interactive map of Mavros

Geography
- Coordinates: 35°16′02″N 26°13′19″E
- Archipelago: Cretan Islands

Administration
- Greece
- Region: Crete
- Regional unit: Lasithi

Demographics
- Population: 0 (2001)

Mavros (Greek: Μαύρος, "black"), is an uninhabited Greek islet, in the Aegean Sea, close to the eastern coast of Crete. Administratively it lies within the Itanos municipality of Lasithi. It is also known as Mavronisi, "black island".

== See also ==
- List of islands of Greece
