= The Special Chancellery =

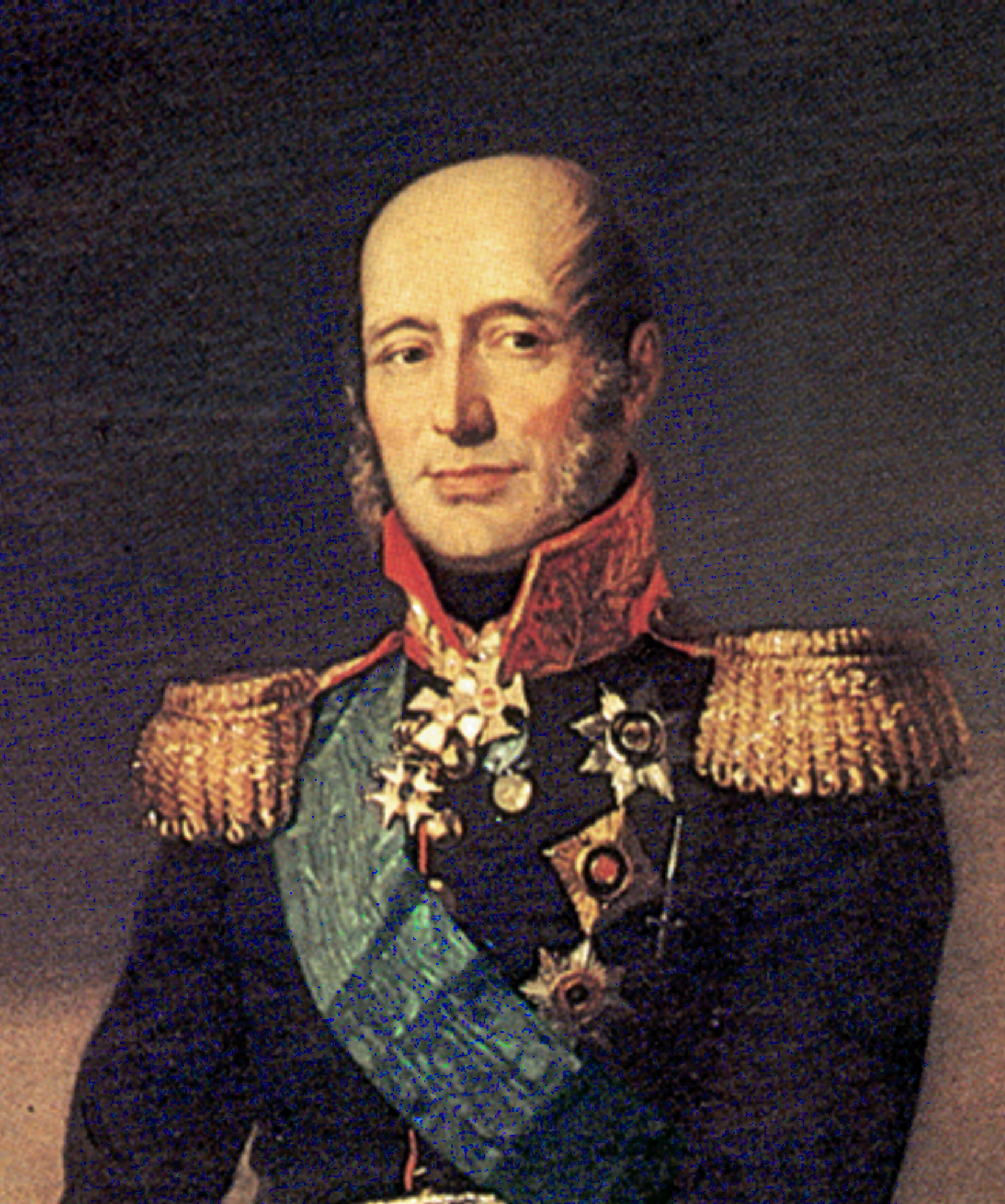
Barclay1828.jpg

The Special Chancellery was a unit of Russian foreign intelligence in the beginning of the 19th century, serving the reign of Alexander I of Russia during the Napoleonic wars. The Special Chancellery participated in the two years prior to and during the French invasion of Russia in 1812. The Special Chancellery operated under the Minister of War. The Minister of War at the time, Michael Andreas Barclay de Tolly, created the Special Chancellery in 1812. The Special Chancellery's mission was to gather intelligence on the political activity, military activity, and economy of European states that were a potential enemy of Russia, particularly France. Its operations focused on strategic intelligence, operational and tactical intelligence, and counterintelligence. The Special Chancellery is known to be the birth of counterespionage in Russia.

== History ==
Barclay de Tolly began organizing the program for the Special Chancellery in 1810 when he received the appointment of Minister of War. He had served for years in the Russian army and Alexander deemed him a more experienced and tactical military strategist than his predecessor, General Alexander Arakcheev. As a result, Tsar Alexander appointed him as the Minister of War on 18 January 1810, when relations between Russia and France began to increase in tension. Through Barclay de Tolly's experience as a Field Marshal on the battlefield, he identified the need for Russia's military to have timely and accurate intelligence on the enemy's intentions, movements, and capabilities. The same month Barclay de Tolly was appointed the Minister of War, he sent Alexander an outlined proposal for an intelligence program that would consist of high ranking Russian military officers to be sent to Russian embassies in Europe under the guise of military attaches to collect and send intelligence back to headquarters in St. Petersburg. Tsar Alexander accepted the proposal, and the organization for the group that came to be known as the Special Chancellery began.

== Organization ==
As a covert organization with classified missions, the Special Chancellery was a small group. The entire organization consisted of Barclay de Tolly as the Minister of Defense, a director of the Special Chancellery or aide-de-camp, three expeditors, a translator, and seven intelligence agents.

When Barclay first began organizing the Special Chancellery in 1810, he appointed Colonel Alexei Voyeikov to be his aide-de-camp. During the war of 1812, Barclay de Tolly became the supreme Commander of the 1st Army of the West, the major army that was Napoleon in Russia. He appointed Voyeikov, who had been in the Russian military since 1799, to handle the intelligence coming in from the agents in Europe. However, in 1812, he was dismissed and Colonel Arseny Zakrevsky took his position.

== Special Chancellery Intelligence Officers ==
Barclay de Tolly sent military officers to various Russian embassies in Europe with the official status of being attaches. Barclay de Tolly had seven officers operating under his command: Lieutenant Alexander Chernyshyov, Lieutenant G.F. Orlov, Colonel F.V. Teil Von Seraskerken, Colonel R.E. Renin, Lieutenant P.I. Brozin, Lieutenant P.H. Grabbe, and Major Victor von Prendel. Chernyshev had the most responsibility as he headed the Russian intelligence operations in Paris, Orlov and Renin were both stationed in Berlin, and Brozin was in Madrid. Teil Von Seraskerken was in Vienna, Grabbe collected intelligence in Munich, while Prendel was stationed in Dresden.

== Special Chancellery Operations in France ==
As a Russian military officer who had gained recognition for his military exploits, Alexander Chernyshyov seemed to be the most qualified officer to represent the Special Chancellery in Paris, France. In Paris, Chernyshyov created an extensive network within French nobility, maintain relationships with nobles such as Carolina, the Queen of Naples and Napoleon's own sister. Chernyshyov himself had a network of spies in the French government and military that provided him with bi-weekly reports on topics such as troop activities, locations, and strengths. His most famous informant was a French soldier named Michele, who had been an informant for Russia since 1804. Michele and the other informants would give Chernyshyov a report every 2 weeks for a lump sum, which Chernyshyov would translate and send to St. Petersburg for Barclay de Tolly to brief Tsar Alexander. Chernyshyov would also provide profiles of Napoleon's top generals in the reports in addition to the intelligence on the French troops.
