= National Digital Archives =

National archives of Poland

- Interactive map of National Digital Archives
- 52°12′31″N 20°58′40″E
- Alternative name: Polish: Narodowe Archiwum Cyfrowe
- Location: ul. Stefana Hankiewicza 1
- Type: State archive
- Established: March 8, 2008
- Director: Piotr Zawilski
- Website: www.nac.gov.pl

National Digital Archives (Polish: Narodowe Archiwum Cyfrowe, NAC) are the national archives of Poland, collecting and digitising audiovisual materials.

The NAC is one of three central State Archives (Archiwa Państwowe), other two being Central Archives of Historical Records, and the Archives of Modern Records. The National Digital Archives were established on 28 March 2008 by transforming the Archives of Audiovisual Records (Archiwum Dokumentacji Mechanicznej 'Mechanical Documentation Archives') created in 1955.

== Collection ==
The NAC's collections include:

- over 15 million photographs taken since the 1940s;
- over 40 thousand sound recordings produced between 1889 and 2008;
- about 2.4 thousand motion picture recordings made between 1928 and 1993;

which are all divided into 159 groups. The whole collection is available for the public through the Archives' reading room, while digitised records are made accessible through the website Szukaj w Archiwach (transl. Search in Archives) run by the NAC.

== See also ==
- Central Archives of Historical Records
- Archives of Modern Records
- List of libraries in Poland
