= Central Archives of Historical Records =

Archive in Poland

Coordinates: 52.250078°N 21.00841°E

Central Archives of Historical Records in Warsaw
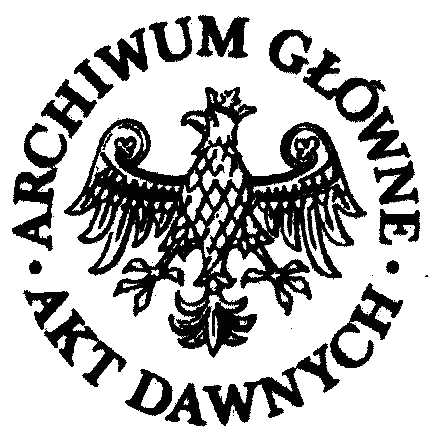

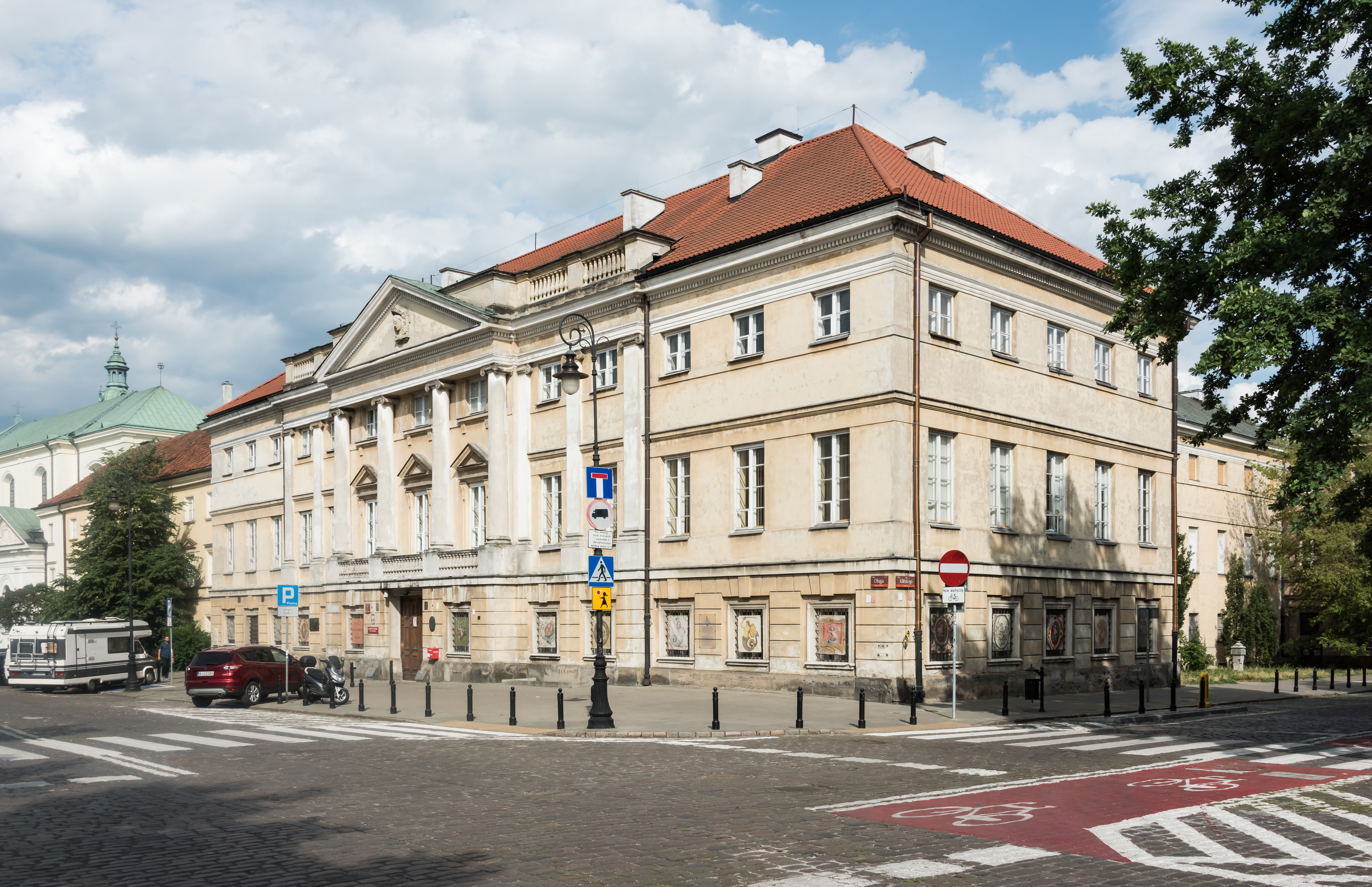
- Archive headquarters at Długa 7 Street in Warsaw
- Interactive map of Central Archives of Historical Records in Warsaw
- Alternative name: Polish: Archiwum Główne Akt Dawnych
- Location: 7 Długa Street, Śródmieście, Warsaw, Poland
- Established: September 2, 1808
- Website: agad.gov.pl

Central Archives of Historical Records in Warsaw (Polish: Archiwum Główne Akt Dawnych w Warszawie, AGAD) is one of Poland's three national archives. It holds records ranging from 12th century until World War I. The current headquarters are located in the Raczyński Palace at 7 Długa Street in Warsaw.

== History ==
The AGAD was founded in 1808.

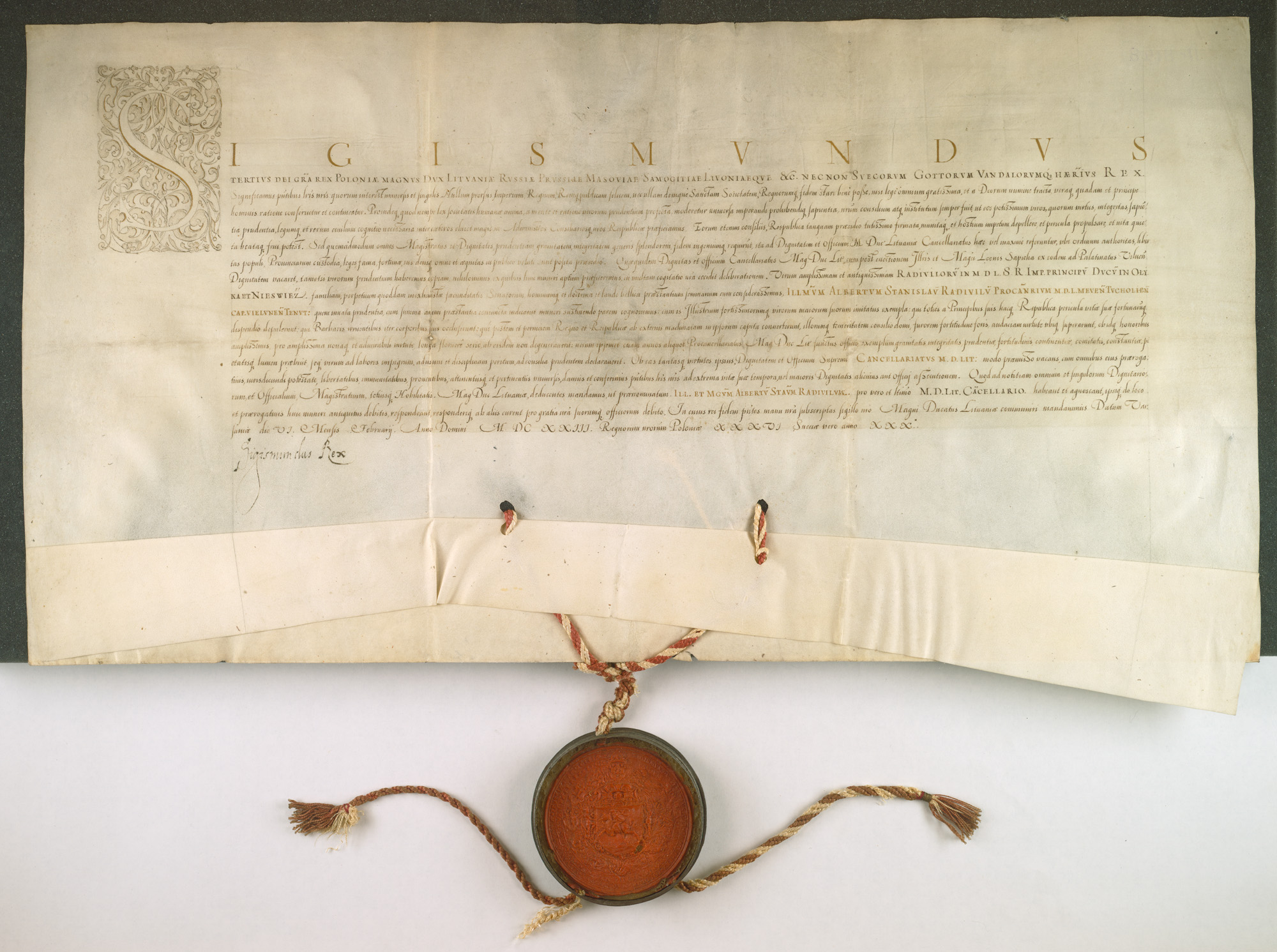
An example document from the archive: Act by Sigismund III Vasa granting to Albrycht Stanisław Radziwiłł the title of Lithuanian Chancellor

A large portion of the AGAD's holdings were intentionally destroyed by Nazi Germany during World War II in 1939 and in 1944. In the aftermath of the suppression of the Warsaw Uprising of 1944, the archives were not only deliberately set ablaze, but the Nazi German troops also entered each of the nine accessible fire-proof vaults in the underground shelter and meticulously burned one after another (the entrance to the 10th was blocked by rubble, thus saving its contents).

=== Official names ===
The archive went through several name changes:

- National General Archive (Polish: Archiwum Ogólne Krajowe) (1808-1816)
- Central Archives of the Polish Kingdom (Polish: Archiwum Główne Królestwa Polskiego) (1816-1889)
- Warsaw Central Archive of Historical Records of the Polish Kingdom (Polish: Warszawskie Archiwum Główne Akt Dawnych Królestwa Polskiego) (1889-1918)
- Central Archives of Historical Records (Polish: Archiwum Główne Akt Dawnych) (since 1918)

=== Archive Directors ===
- Walenty Skorochód Majewski (1808–1835)
- Feliks Bentkowski (1838–1852)
- Walenty Hubert (1853–1875)
- Adolf Pawiński (1875–1896)
- Teodor Wierzbowski (1897–1919)
- Stanisław Kętrzyński (1919–1920)
- Józef Siemieński (1920–1939)
- Adam Stebelski (1939–1953)
- Michał Wąsowicz (1954–1976)
- Kazimierz Krzos (1976–1979)
- Mieczysław Motas (1979–1981)
- Edward Potkowski (1981–1986)
- Władysław Stępniak (1986–1997)
- Hubert Wajs (from 1997)

== See also ==
- National Digital Archives
- Archives of Modern Records
