= Archives of Modern Records =

Archive in Poland

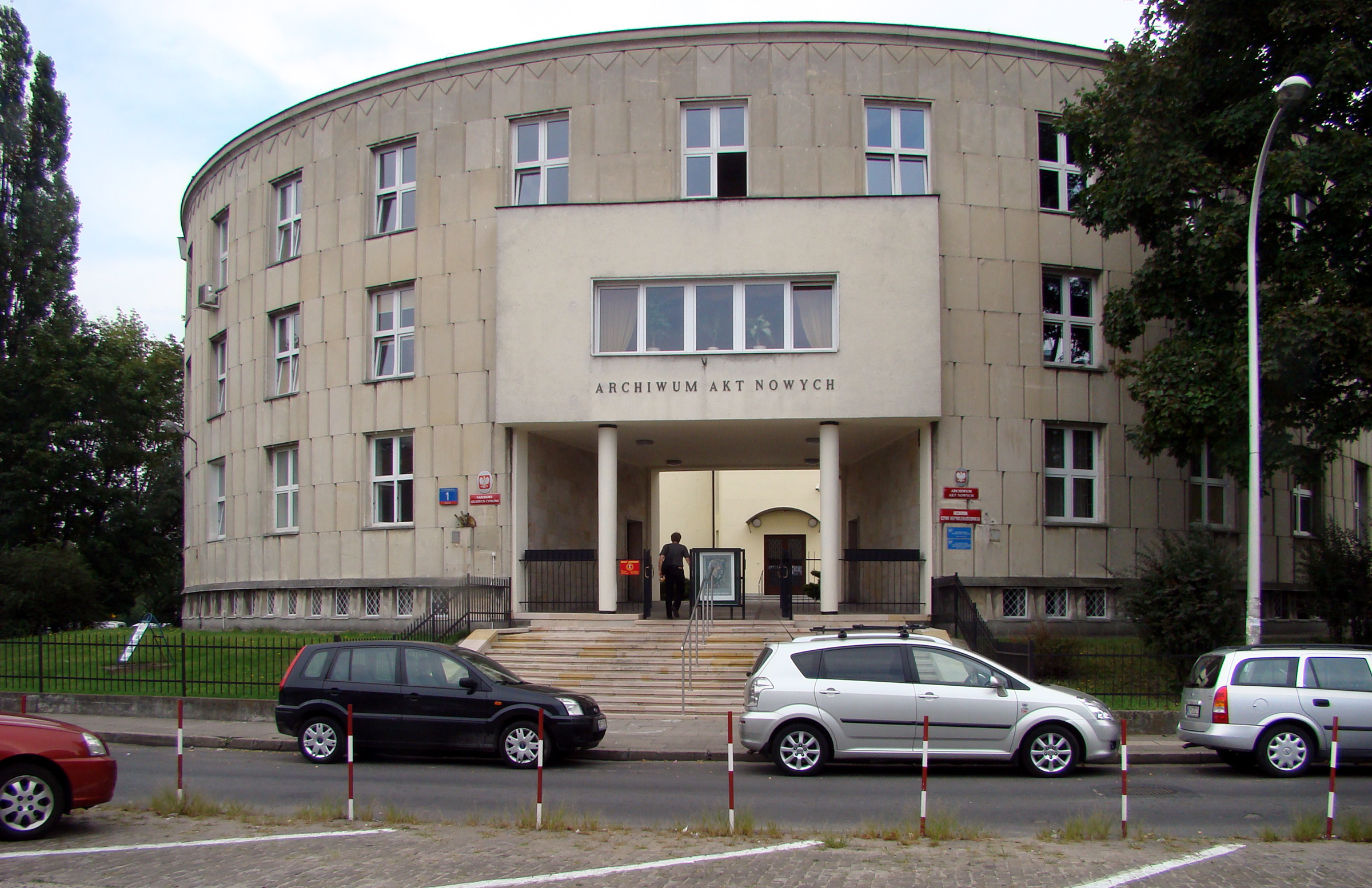
- Interactive map of Archives of Modern Records
- 52°12′31″N 20°58′40″E
- Alternative name: Polish: Archiwum Akt Nowych
- Location: Stefana Kazimierza Hankiewicza 1, 02-103, Warsaw, Poland
- Type: State archive
- Established: February 7, 1919
- Director: Mariusz Olczak
- Employees: 150
- Website: aan.gov.pl

The Archives of Modern Records (Polish: Archiwum Akt Nowych, AAN) is a central state archive located in Warsaw. It was established in 1919 as the Military Archive by Chief of State Józef Piłsudski; it has functioned under its current name since 1930. The first director of the archive was Andrzej Wojtkowski.

== History ==
The AAN was established under the decree of Chief of State Józef Piłsudski on February 7, 1919, on the organization of state archives and the care of archival materials. The governing body it was subordinate to was the Ministry of Religious Affairs and Public Enlightenment. The tasks of the archives included securing documentation from the German and Austrian military occupation authorities from the years 1915-1918.

Initially, the archives were headed by Andrzej Wojtkowski, seconded from the State Archives Department of the Ministry of Religious Affairs and Public Enlightenment. At the end of 1919, Dr. Juliusz Rencki took over the leadership of the Archive, who in turn was replaced by Dr. Wincenty Łopaciński in 1922. In October 1924, Dr. Józef Stojanowski became the head. Due to the existence of a second Military Archive subordinate to military authorities, he applied for a change in the institution's statute and name.

On July 1, 1930, the civilian Military Archives was transformed into the Archives of Modern Records, with Stojanowski remaining as director. The archives began collecting and storing archival materials resulting from the activities of central Polish offices and institutions.

== See also ==
- Central Archives of Historical Records
- National Digital Archives
