= Edward Manteuffel-Szoege =

Polish artist

- Born: Edward Antoni Manteuffel; 5 July 1908; Rezhitsa, Vitebsk Governorate, Russian Empire
- Died: 1940 (aged 31–32); Kharkov, Ukrainian SSR, USSR

Edward Manteuffel-Szoege (born Edward Antoni Manteuffel, 5 July 1908 – 1940) was a Polish artist. He competed in the art competitions at the 1936 Summer Olympics. After the outbreak of the Second World War, Manteuffel-Szoege was arrested by the NKVD. In 1940, he was murdered by the Soviets.
