= Monique =

Name list

- Pronunciation: /moʊˈniːk/ moh-NEEK
- Gender: Female
- Language: French

Origin
- Meaning: Advisor
- Region of origin: France

Other names
- Related names: Monica; Monika; Moonika; Mona

Monique is a female given name. It is the French form of the name Monica. The name has enjoyed some popularity in the United States since about 1955, and is less common in other English-speaking countries except for Canada although mostly used by French speakers in Quebec and is rare in the English parts of Canada.

== Notable people named Monique ==
=== Acting ===
- Monique Alves Frankenhuis (1962–1994), Brazilian actress
- Monique Alfradique (born 1986), Brazilian actress
- Monique Chaumette (born 1927), French actress
- Monique Coleman (born 1980), American actress, singer, and dancer
- Monique Curi (born 1969), Brazilian actress
- Monique Gabriela Curnen (born 1970), American actress
- Monique Dupree (born 1974), American actress
- Monique Evans (born 1956), Brazilian television personality
- Monique Evans (born 1992), American beauty pageant titleholder
- Monique Gabrielle (born 1963), American actress
- Mo'Nique Hicks (born 1967), American actress and comedian
- Monique Joyce (1912–1994), French actress
- Monique Kirsanoff (1913–2008), French film editor
- Monique Leyrac (1928–2019), Canadian singer and actress
- Monique Loudières (born 1956), French ballet dancer and teacher
- Monique Luiz (born 1961), American former child model
- Monique Mélinand (1916–2012), French actress
- Monique Mercure (1930–2020), Canadian actress
- Monique L. Midgette, American actress
- Monique Miller (born 1933), French Canadian actress
- Monique Mojica, Canadian playwright, director, and actor
- Monique Noel (born 1967), American glamour model and actress
- Monique Riley, Australian model and actress
- Monique Rolland (1913–1999), French film actress
- Monique Rutler (born 1941), French-Portuguese film editor
- Monique Samuels, American television personality
- Monique Sand, French ballet dancer
- Monique Spaziani (born 1957), Canadian actress
- Monique Thierry (1940–2021), French actress
- Monique van de Ven (born 1952), Dutch actress and film director
- Monique van Vooren (1927–2020), American actress
- Monique Williams, Australian actress
- Monique Wilson (born 1970), Filipina actress
- Monique Heart (born 1986), the stage name of American drag queen Kevin Richardson
- Monique Williams, actress in Australian television series The Sleepover Club

=== Music ===
- Monique Brumby (born 1974), Australian singer-songwriter, guitarist, and producer
- Monique Brynnel, Swedish-Australian operatic soprano
- Monique Buzzarté (born 1960), American composer, trombonist, and activist
- Monique Desroches (born 1948), Québécois ethnomusicologist
- Monique Gendron, Canadian organist
- Monique Haas (1909–1987), French pianist
- Monique de La Bruchollerie (1915–1972), French pianist
- Monique diMattina (born 1971), Australian jazz pianist, singer and composer
- Monique Melsen (born 1951), Luxembourgian singer
- Monique Mund-Dopchie (born 1943), Belgian classicist
- Monique Powell, singer for American ska band Save Ferris
- Monique Rhodes, New Zealand singer, songwriter, and producer
- Monique Zanetti (born 1961), French soprano
- Tamia Monique Carter, given name of rapper Flo Milli

=== Politics ===
- Monique Andréas Esoavelomandroso (1945–2025), Malagasy politician
- Monique Barbut (born 1956), French politician
- Monique Bauer-Lagier (1922–2006), Swiss politician
- Monique Boulestin (born 1951), French politician
- Monique Bozizé, Central African politician
- Monique Cerisier-ben Guiga (1942–2021), French politician
- Monique Chandler-Waterman, American politician
- Monique van Daalen, Dutch diplomat
- Monique D. Davis (born 1936), American politician
- Monique Gagnon-Tremblay (born 1940), Canadian politician
- Monique Griseti (born 1960), French politician
- Monique Guay (born 1959), Quebec politician
- Monique Holsey-Hyman, American politician
- Monique Iborra (born 1945), French politician
- Monique Jérôme-Forget (born 1940), Canadian politician
- Monique Koeyers-Felida (1967–2016), Curaçaoan politician
- Monique Lagdameo (born 1975), Filipino politician
- Monique Landry (born 1937), Canadian politician
- Monique LeBlanc, Canadian politician
- Monique Limon (born 1953), French politician
- Monique Limón (born 1979), American politician
- Monique Lubin (born 1963), French politician
- Monique Mukaruliza, Rwandan politician
- Monique Mukuna Mutombo (born 1974), Congolese politician
- Monique Ouli Ndongo (born 1958), Cameroonian politician
- Monique Nsanzabaganwa, Rwandan politician
- Monique Ohsan Bellepeau, former Vice President of Mauritius
- Monique Orphé (born 1964), French politician
- Monique Owens (born 1984), American politician
- Monique Papon (1934–2018), French politician
- Monique Pauzé, Quebec politician
- Monique Priestley, Vermont politician
- Monique Rabin (born 1954), French politician
- Monique Richard (born 1947), Quebec politician
- Monique Roy Verville (born 1961), Canadian politician
- Monique Sauvé (born 1960), Canadian politician
- Monique Scott, American politician
- Monique Smith (Canadian politician) (born c. 1965), Ontario politician
- Monique Smith (Ohio politician), American politician
- Monique Taitt, Barbadian politician
- Monique Tardif (1936–2016), Canadian politician
- Monique Taylor (born 1972), Canadian politician
- Monique Vézina (1935–2024), Canadian politician
- Monique de Vries (born 1947), Dutch politician
- Monique Willocq (born 1949), Belgian politician
- Monique Wilson (politician), Saban politician
- Monique Worrell, American prosecutor and politician

=== Sports ===
- Monique Adamczak (born 1983), Australian professional tennis player
- Monique Adams (born 1970), American volleyball player
- Monique Akoa Makani (born 2001), Cameroonian basketball player
- Monique Albuquerque (born 1991), Brazilian tennis player
- Monique Allen (born 1971), Australian gymnast
- Monique Ambers (born 1970), American basketball player and coach
- Monique Angermüller (born 1984), German speed skater
- Monique Baelden (1938–2015), French gymnast
- Monique Bantégny (born 1940), French pentathlete
- Monique Barry, New Zealand tennis player
- Monique Berlioux (1923–2015), French swimmer
- Monique Billings (born 1996), American basketball player
- Monique Bolleboom (born 1962), Dutch artistic gymnast
- Monique Bosga (born 1960), Dutch swimmer
- Monique de Bruin (born 1965), Dutch cyclist
- Monique de Bruin (born 1977), American fencer
- Monique Burkland (born 1989), American Paralympic volleyball player
- Monique Cabral (born 1986), Trinidadian sprinter
- Monique Cilione (born 1994), Australian javelin thrower
- Monique Conti (born 1999), Australian basketball player
- Monique Coupat (born 1955), French rower
- Monique Currie (born 1983), American basketball player
- Monique Drilhon (1922–2019), French sprinter
- Monique Drost (born 1964), Dutch swimmer
- Monique van de Elzen (born 1976), New Zealand footballer
- Monique Éwanjé-Épée (born 1967), French track and field athlete
- Monique Ferreira (born 1980), Brazilian freestyle swimmer
- Monique Fischer (born 1991), Samoan footballer
- Monique Freres (born 1957), Belgian gymnast
- Monique Garbrecht-Enfeldt (born 1968), German speed skater
- Monique Gladding (born 1981), British diver
- Monique Heinke (born 1973), Australian rower
- Monique Henderson (born 1983), American track and field athlete
- Monique Hennagan (born 1976), American track and field athlete
- Monique Hirovanaa (born 1966), New Zealand rugby player
- Monique Hollick (born 1989), Australian rules footballer
- Monique Hoogland (born 1967), Dutch badminton player
- Monique Iannella (born 1996), Australian professional footballer
- Monique Jansen (born 1978), Dutch discus thrower
- Monique Javer (born 1967), American-born British professional tennis player
- Monique Jenkinson (born 1971) also known as Fauxnique, is an American artist, choreographer, drag performer and author
- Monique Jones (born 1979), American bodybuilder
- Monique Kalkman-Van Den Bosch (born 1964), Dutch wheelchair tennis player
- Monique Kauffmann (born 1963), Dutch road cyclist and speed skater
- Monique Kavelaars (born 1971), Canadian fencer
- Monique Kengné (born 1965), Cameroonian sprinter
- Monique Kerschowski (born 1988), German footballer
- Monique Kiene (born 1974), Dutch tennis player
- Monique Knol (born 1964), Dutch racing cyclist
- Monique Lamoureux (born 1989), American ice hockey player
- Monique van der Lee (born 1973), Dutch Olympic judoka
- Monique Leroux (1938–1985), French fencer
- Monique Lessmeister (born 1987), German darts player
- Monique Mathys (born 1945), Swiss figure skater
- Monique Merrill (born 1969), American ski mountaineer and mountain biker
- Monique Murphy (born 1994), Australian swimmer
- Monique Ngock (born 2004), Cameroonian footballer
- Monique Noirot (born 1941), French sprinter
- Monique Olivier (born 1998), Luxembourgian swimmer
- Monique Pavão (born 1986), Brazilian volleyball player
- Monique Pelletier (born 1969), American alpine skier
- Monique Piétri (1945–1993), French swimmer
- Monique Pronk (born 1958), Dutch rower
- Monique Proulx (1947–2012), Canadian racing driver
- Monique Prud'homme (born 1957), Canadian handball player
- Monique van de Ree (born 1988), Dutch cyclist
- Monique Richard, Canadian mountain climber
- Monique Riekewald (born 1979), German skeleton racer
- Monique Riesterer (born 1971), German weightlifter
- Monique Robins (born 1983), New Zealand swimmer
- Monique Rodahl (born 1960), New Zealand swimmer
- Monique Rossi (1937–2018), French gymnast
- Monique Ruck-Petit (born 1942), French chess player
- Monique Salfati (born 1945), French former professional tennis player
- Monique Scheier-Schneider (born 1954), Luxembourg ice hockey administrator
- Monique Smit (born 1991), South African professional golfer
- Monique Stojanovic (born 1992), Australian volleyball player
- Monique Sullivan (born 1989), Canadian cyclist
- Monique Tijsterman (born 1969), Dutch handball coach
- Monique Van Haver (born 1948), Belgian tennis player
- Monique van der Velden, Dutch figure skater
- Monique Velzeboer, Dutch speed skater
- Monique Viele (born 1984), American tennis player
- Monique van der Vorst (born 1984), Dutch racing cyclist
- Monique de Vries (born 1947), Australian sailor
- Monique Williams (born 1985), New Zealand sprinter
- Monique de Wilt (born 1976), Dutch pole vaulter
- Monique Yvinou (1928–2021), French gymnast

=== Other fields ===
- Monique Adolphe (1932–2022), French cell biologist
- Monique Agazarian (1920–1993) British pilot in Air Transport Auxiliary, later a pioneer of flight simulators.
- Monique Alexander (born 1982), American pornographic actress
- Monique Barbeau, Canadian executive chef
- Monique Bégin (1936–2023), Canadian academic and former politician
- Monique de Bissy (1923–2009), French-Belgian World War II resistance member
- Monique Boekaerts (born 1946), Belgian educationalist
- Monique Bosco (1927–2007), Austrian-born Canadian journalist and writer
- Monique Breteler, Dutch neuro epidemiologist
- Monique Canto-Sperber (born 1954), French philosopher
- Monique Charbonneau (1928–2014), Canadian artist
- Monique Marie Chouraeshkenazi (born 1983), American professor
- Monique Chyba, control theorist
- Monique Combescure (born 1950), French mathematical physicist
- Monique Corriveau (1927–1976), Canadian writer
- Monique Cossard, French-American educator
- Monique Dauge, French mathematician
- Monique Deland (born 1958), Quebecer poet
- Monique Deveaux, Canadian philosopher
- Monique Fiso (born 1987), New Zealand-Samoan chef and author
- Monique Ganderton (born 1980), Canadian stuntwoman
- Monique Gray Smith, Canadian writer
- Monique Hanotte (1920–2022), Belgian resistance member
- Monique Harvey (1950–2001), Canadian painter
- Monique van Heist (born 1972), Dutch fashion designer
- Monique Ilboudo, Burkinabé author and human rights activist
- Monique Jacot (1934–2024), Swiss photographer and photojournalist
- Monique Jeanblanc, French mathematician and economist
- Monique Journod (1935–2024), French painter and lithographer
- Monique Keraudren (1928–1981), French botanist
- Monique Laederach (1938–2004), Swiss writer and translator
- Monique LaRue (born 1948), Canadian writer
- Monique Laurent, French computer scientist and mathematician
- Monique Lhuillier (born 1971), Filipino-American fashion designer
- Monique Mayère, French artist
- Monique Morrow, Swiss-American tech executive
- Monique Mujawamariya (born 1955), Rwandan activist
- Monique Borgerhoff Mulder, American evolutionary anthropologist
- Monique Nemni (1935/1936–2022), Canadian linguist and writer
- Monique Pantel (1932–2021), French film critic and journalist
- Monique Péan (born c. 1981), American fine jewelry designer
- Monique Philippart, Luxembourg German-language children’s writer
- Monique Pinçon-Charlot (born 1946), French sociologist
- Monique Polak (born 1960), Canadian writer
- Monique Prieto (born 1962), American artist
- Monique Proulx (born 1952), Canadian author and screenwriter
- Monique Raphel High (1949–2017), American novelist
- Monique Régimbald-Zeiber (born 1947), Canadian painter
- Monique Rodriguez, American entrepreneur and the founder of Mielle Organics
- Monique Roffey (born 1965), Trinidadian-born British writer
- Monique de Roux (born 1946), French painter and engraver
- Monique Ryan, Australian pediatric neurologist
- Monique Saint-Hélier, Swiss writer
- Monique de Saint-Martin, French sociologist
- Monique Scheer, American-German historical and cultural anthropologist
- Monique Schwitter (born 1972), Swiss writer and actress
- Monique Sené, French nuclear physicist
- Monique Simmonds, English botanist
- Monique Skidmore (born 1968), Australian medical and political anthropologist
- Monique Smit (born 1989), Dutch singer and television presenter
- Monique Teillaud (born 1961), French researcher
- Monique Thomas, murdered black trans woman from Dorchester, Massachusetts
- Monique Truong (born 1968), Vietnamese-American writer
- Monique Viner (1926–2006), British judge
- Monique Vinh Thuy (1946–2021), widow of Vietnamese emperor Bảo Đại
- Monique Wadsted (born 1957), Swedish lawyer
- Monique Wilson (1928–1982), Wiccan priestess
- Monique Wittig (1935–2003), French writer and feminist theorist
- Monique Wright (born 1973), Australian journalist and television personality
- Monique Zaahl (born 1975), South African geneticist
- Norodom Monineath (born 1936), queen mother of Cambodia, sometimes referred to as Queen Monique

=== Fictional characters ===
- Monique, friend of the title character in the Disney cartoon series, Kim Possible
- Monique, a cat villager from the video game series Animal Crossing
- Monique Jeffries, character in American crime drama television series Law & Order: Special Victims Unit
- Monique Pollier, Orson Hodge's deceased mistress in Desperate Housewives

== See also ==
- Monica (given name)
