= Dauge =

Dauge and Daugé are French surnames. Notable people with these surnames include:

- August Dauge, consul for the Belgian concession of Tianjin
- Catherine Daugé (born 1956), French Olympic gymnast
- Enoch Dauge (died 1842), American owner of Dozier Farm in Tennessee
- Felix Dauge (1829–1899), Belgian mathematician and politician
- Louis Dauge (1918–2016), French diplomat, president of French Red Cross
- Lucas Dauge, French cyclist for Team Novo Nordisk
- Maurice Daugé, French competitor in Golf at the Inter-Allied Games
- Monique Dauge (born 1956), French mathematician
- Pauls Dauge (1869–1946), Latvian dentist and revolutionary
- Peter Dauge, American revolutionary officer in Wilmington District Brigade
- Valérie Dauge, French politician in Departmental Council of Vienne
- Walter Dauge (1907–1944), Belgian Trotskyist politician
- Yves Dauge (born 1935), French politician

== See also ==
- Daegu, city in South Korea
- Daugai, city in Lithuania
