= Cossard =

Cossard is a French surname. It may refer to:

- Gisèle Cossard (1923–2016), French-Brazilian anthropologist
- Monique Cossard (1921–2023), French-American educator, writer
- 4993 Cossard, a minor planet named for Guido Cossard, an Italian astronomer (born 1958)

== See also ==
- Gossard
- Cossar
- Cossart
