= Cossar =

Cossar is a surname. Notable people with the surname include:

- George Payne Cossar (1907–1992), American lawyer and politician
- James Cossar Ewart (1851–1933), Scottish zoologist
- John Cossar (1858–1935), English actor
- Rose Cossar (born 1991), Canadian gymnast

This surname is being researched by a member of The Guild of One-Name Studies. https://one-name.org/

== See also ==
- Cossart
- Cossard
