= Alison Des Forges =

American historian and human rights activist

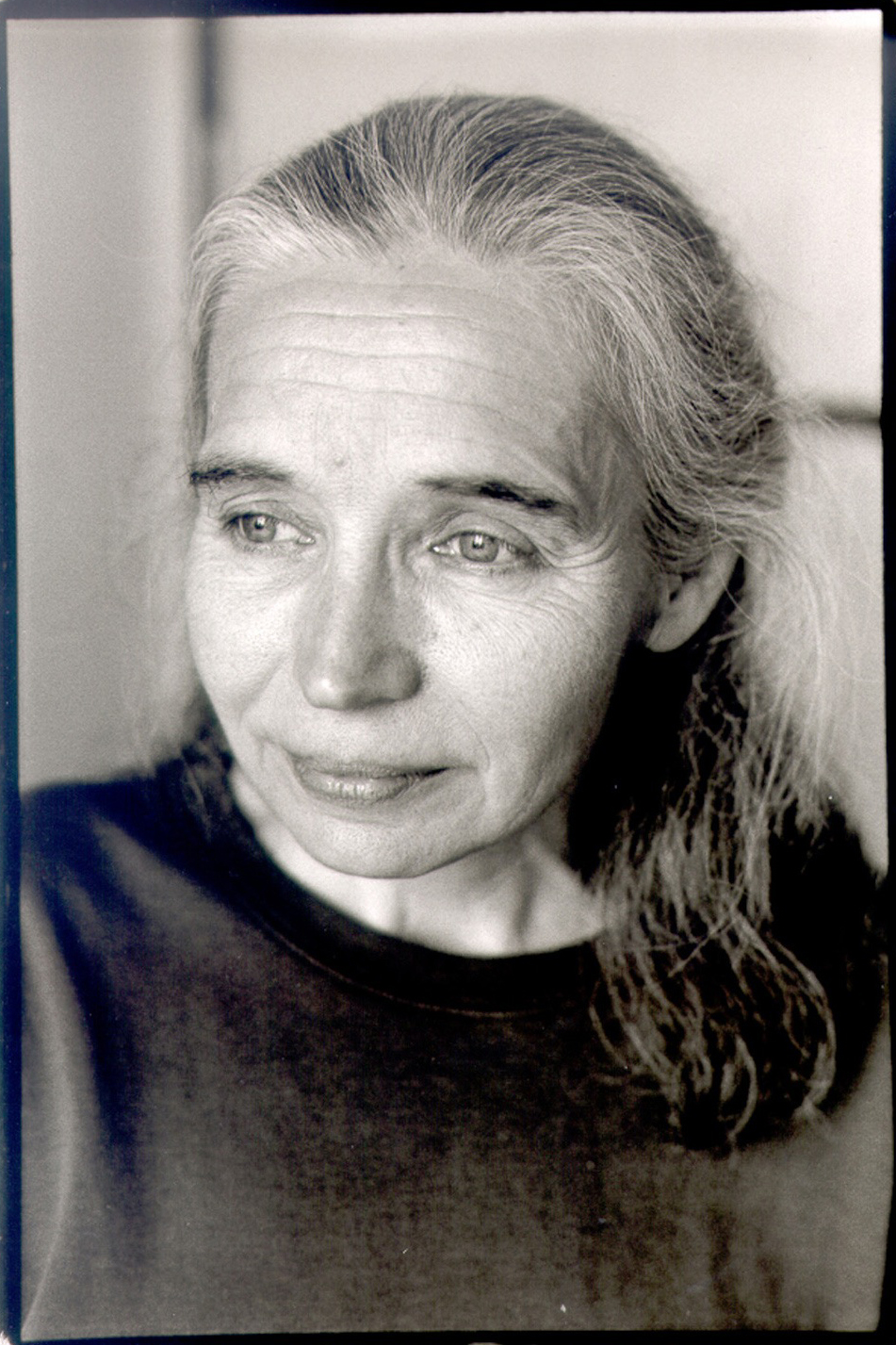
- Alison Des Forges, 2005
- Born: Alison B. Liebhafsky; August 20, 1942; Schenectady, New York, U.S.
- Died: February 12, 2009 (aged 66); Clarence Center, New York, U.S.
- Education: Radcliffe College; Yale University
- Known for: Human rights activism
- Spouse: Roger V. Des Forges (m. 1964)
- Children: 2

Alison Des Forges (née Liebhafsky; August 20, 1942 – February 12, 2009) was an American historian and human rights activist who specialized in the African Great Lakes region, particularly the 1994 Rwandan genocide. At the time of her death, she was a senior advisor for the African continent at Human Rights Watch. She died in a plane crash on February 12, 2009.

== Life ==
Alison Des Forges was born Alison B. Liebhafsky on August 20, 1942, to Sybil Small and Herman A. Liebhafsky. In 1964, she married Roger Des Forges, a historian at the State University of New York at Buffalo who specializes in China. Des Forges earned her BA in history from Radcliffe College in 1964, and her MA and a PhD in the same discipline from Yale University in 1966 and 1972. Her master's thesis and doctoral dissertation both addressed the impact of European colonialism on Rwanda. Her dissertation Defeat Is the Only Bad News: Rwanda under Musinga, 1896–1931 was published posthumously in 2011. Describing the politics of the court during the reign of Yuhi Musinga, it shows how divisions among different groups in Rwanda shaped their responses to colonial governments, missionaries and traders.

She specialized in the African Great Lakes region and studied the Rwandan genocide. She was also an authority on human rights violations in the Democratic Republic of Congo and in Burundi.

Des Forges left academia in 1994 in response to the Rwandan genocide to work full-time on human rights.

In 1999, she was named a MacArthur Fellow in recognition of her work as a "human rights leader." She became the senior advisor at Human Rights Watch for the African continent.

She died on February 12, 2009, in the air crash of Continental Connection Flight 3407, en route from Newark, New Jersey, to her home in Buffalo, New York.

== Witness to Rwandan genocide ==
Des Forges is thought to have been the most knowledgeable American about the genocide as it was unfolding. Aside from her education, she had been visiting Rwanda since 1963. In April 1994, she began calling fellow activist Monique Mujawamariya in Rwanda every half-hour, and could hear the gunfire approaching steadily closer with each conversation. She was on the phone with Mujawmariya, when Mujawmariya apologized for putting the receiver down, as she did not want Des Forges to hear her die. She also asked Des Forges to care for her children. Mujawmariya lived, but her reports meant that Des Forges was one of the first outsiders to observe that a full-blown genocide was underway in Rwanda, and afterwards led a team of researchers to establish the facts. She testified 11 times before the International Criminal Tribunal for Rwanda, and gave evidence about the Rwandan genocide to panels of the French National Assembly, the Belgian Senate, the US Congress, the Organisation of African Unity, and the United Nations.

She was the primary author of the 1999 book Leave None to Tell the Story, which The Economist and The New York Times both describe as the definitive account of the Rwandan genocide. In the book, she argued that the genocide was organized by the Hutu-dominated Rwandan government at the time, rather than being a spontaneous outbreak of tribal conflicts.

== Legacy ==
Africanist René Lemarchand states, "That the story of Rwanda is at all known in the United States today owes much to the work of Philip Gourevitch and Alison Des Forges."

The Alison Des Forges Award for Extraordinary Activism is named after her; until 2009, it was known as the Human Rights Defenders Award. It was given out by Human Rights Watch.

== Bibliography ==
- Des Forges, Alison. Defeat Is the Only Bad News: Rwanda under Musiinga, 1896–1931 (1972; 2011).
- Des Forges, Alison. Leave None to Tell the Story: Genocide in Rwanda – Human Rights Watch et FIDH – 1999 – ISBN 1-56432-171-1.
- Roth, Kenneth; DesForges, Alison (Summer 2002). "Justice or Therapy?". Boston Review.
