= Christine Bernardi =

French mathematician

- Born: 18 May 1955; Paris, France
- Died: 10 March 2018 (aged 62); Paris, France
- Education: École normale supérieure
- Scientific career
- Fields: Mathematics
- Thesis: Contribution à l'analyse numérique de problèmes non linéaires (1986)
- Doctoral advisor: Pierre-Arnaud Raviart

Christine Bernardi (18 May 1955 – 10 March 2018) was a French mathematician known for her research on numerical analysis of partial differential equations.

== Life ==
Bernardi was born in Paris, and entered the École normale supérieure de jeunes filles in 1974. She earned a master's degree in 1975, a diplôme d'études approfondies in numerical analysis in 1978, a doctorat de troisième cycle in 1979, and a doctorat d'état in 1986. Her 1986 dissertation, Contribution à l'analyse numérique de problèmes non linéaires, was supervised by Pierre-Arnaud Raviart. She became a researcher for the CNRS in 1979, becoming a director of research in 1992. She worked for CNRS at the Laboratoire Jacques-Louis Lions of Pierre and Marie Curie University, and retired for health reasons roughly a year before her death.

== Books ==
Bernardi is the author of:

- Approximations spectrales de problèmes aux limites elliptiques [Spectral approximations of elliptic boundary value problems] (with Yvon Maday, Springer, 1992)
- Spectral methods for axisymmetric domains (with Monique Dauge and Yvon Maday, North-Holland, 1999)
- Discrétisations variationnelles de problèmes aux limites elliptiques [Variational discretizations of elliptic boundary value problems] (with Yvon Maday and Francesca Rapetti, Springer, 2004).

== Recognition ==
In 1995, Bernardi was the winner of the Blaise Pascal Prize, awarded annually for outstanding research in numerical analysis by a young researcher by the French Academy of Sciences in consultation with the Groupe thématique pour l'Avancement des Méthodes Numériques de l'Ingénieur of the Société de Mathématiques Appliquées et Industrielles. She was the first woman to win the prize since its origin in 1985, and until Valérie Perrier won in 2003 she was the only woman to win it.

In 2018, the International Conference on Spectral and High Order Methods initiated the Christine Bernardi Award, for outstanding research by a young woman in "high-order approximations for the solution of PDE’s".
