= Monique Sand =

French ballet dancer (born 1944)

- Born: June 24, 1944; Dakar
- Occupation: Ballet dancer
- Spouse(s): Francis Sinceretti

Monique Sand (born June 24, 1944) is a French ballet dancer, best known for her work as a principal dancer with the Dutch National Ballet from 1971 to 1982.

Monique Sand was born on June 24, 1944 in Dakar, Senegal. She studied at the Ecole de Danse Tanëeff in Toulon, France. She made her debut at the Opera Ballet in Toulon. After performing with the Ballet of the Grand Théâtre de Genève and Hamburg State Opera, she joined the Dutch National Ballet, where she was a principal dancer from 1971 to 1982 and a highlight of what was known as the "golden years" of the Dutch National Ballet.

Among her notable performances were leading roles in the premieres of Peter Van Dyk's Pinocchio (1969), Glen Tetley's Chronochromie (1971), Hans Van Manen's Adagio Hammerklavier (1973) and Sacre du Printemps (1974), and Rudi van Dantzig's Ramifications (1973) and Four Last Songs (1977).

After retirement, she was a dance teacher at the Royal Conservatory of The Hague.
