= Monique L. Midgette =

American actress

Monique L. Midgette is a singer and actress. She has thrice been nominated for a Helen Hayes Award and she has had roles in the Broadway plays The Civil War, Marie Christine, Seussical the Musical, and House of Flowers.

== Awards and commendations ==
- nominated for a Helen Hayes Award in 1996 for Beehive
- nominated for a Helen Hayes Award in 2008 for The Women of Brewster Place

== Discography ==
- Willy Wonka (Original Cast Recording by Cast of Roald Dahl's Willy Wonka, 2004)
- Eagle Song (Cast Recording)
