= Dozier Farm =

Historic house in Tennessee, United States

- U.S. National Register of Historic Places
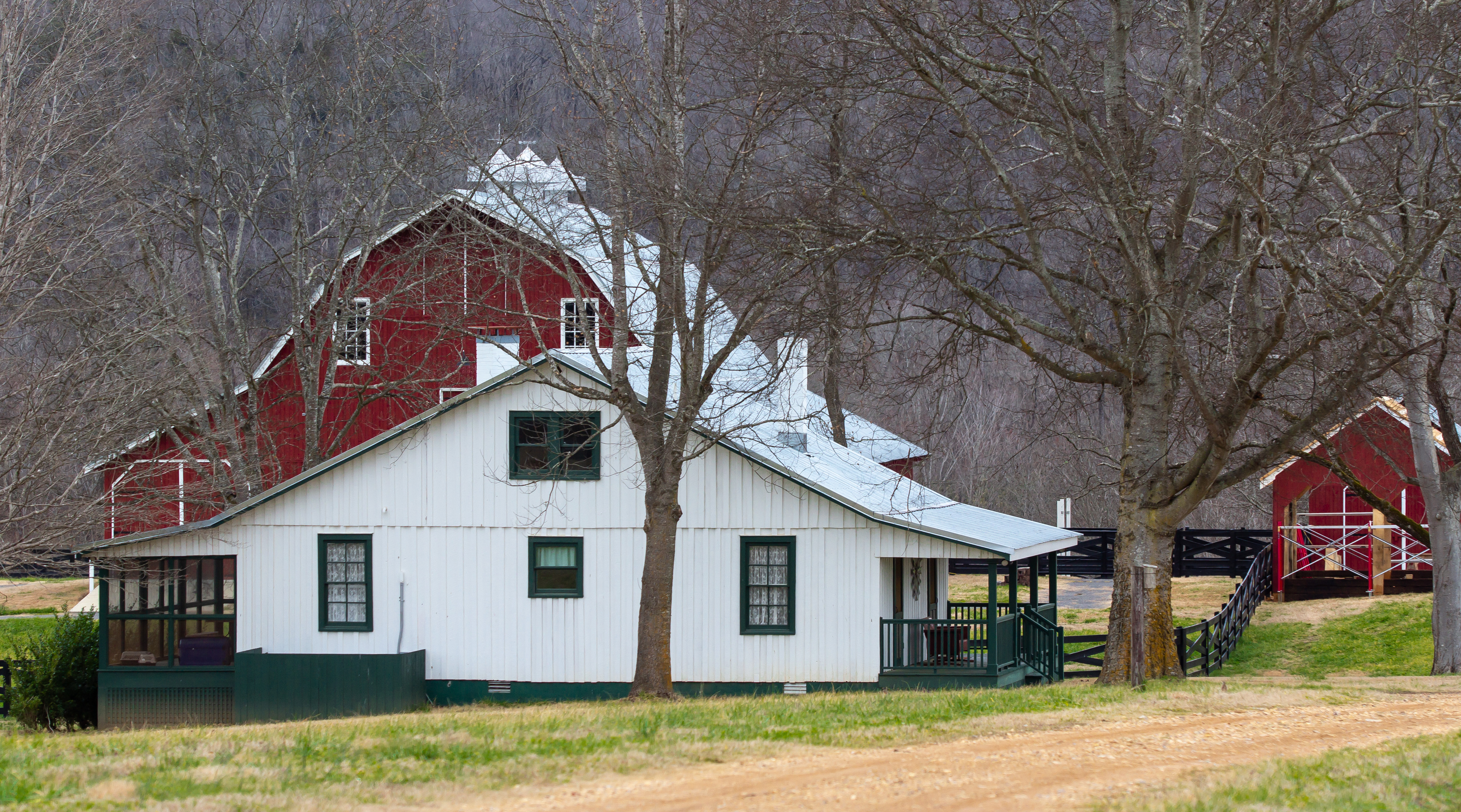
- Dozier Farm

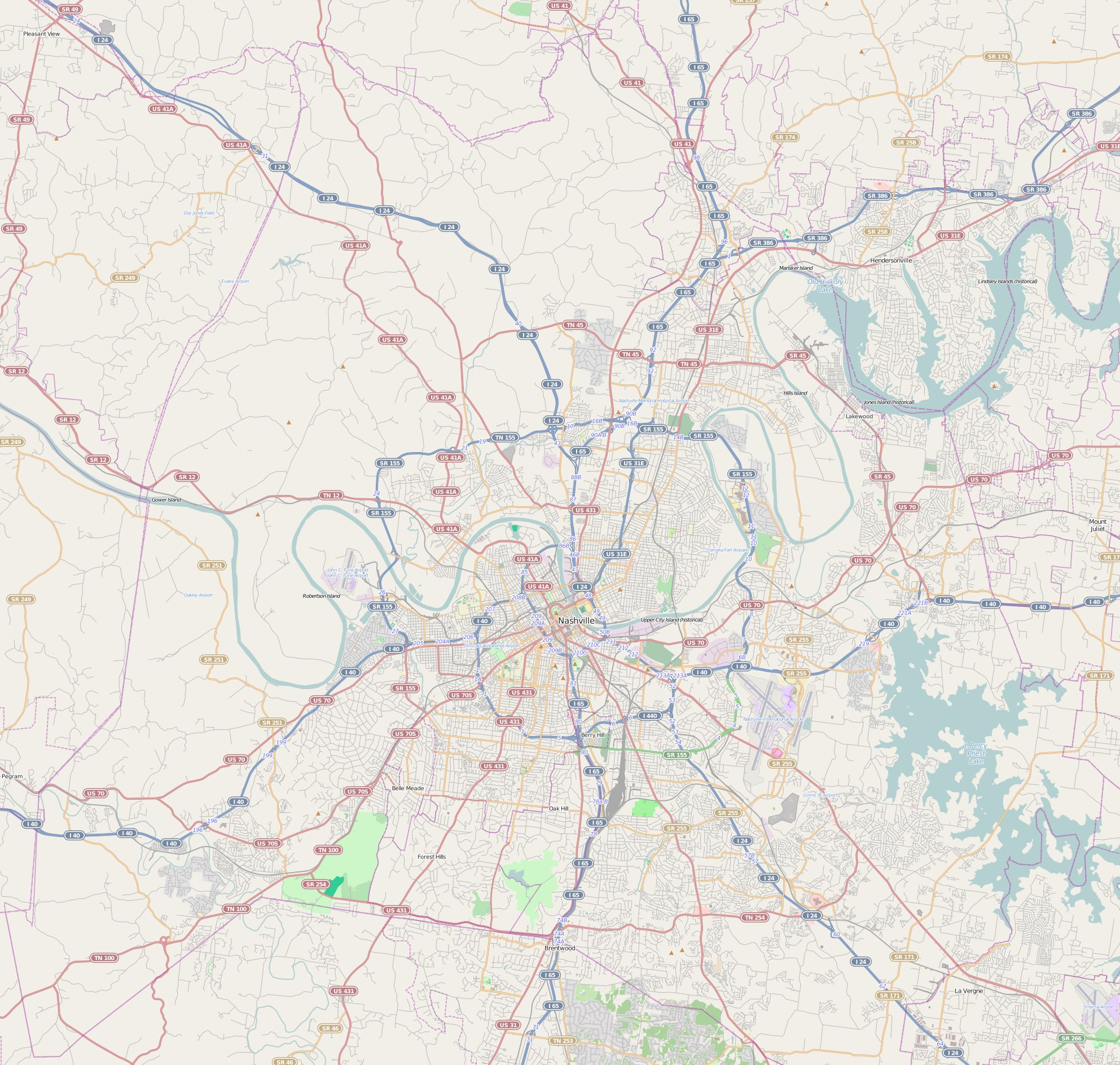
- Location within Nashville Location within Tennessee
- Interactive map showing the location of Dozier Farm
- Nearest city: Nashville, Tennessee
- Area: 50.4 acres (20.4 ha)
- Built: 1842
- Architectural style: Greek Revival, I-house
- NRHP reference No.: 90001580
- Added to NRHP: November 1, 1990

Dozier Farm, also known as Cliffview Farm, is a historic mansion in Nashville, Tennessee, U.S..

== History ==
The land was granted to Peter Poyner for his service in the American Revolutionary War. It was inherited by his brother, Robert Poyner, in the 1790s. In 1801, it was purchased by Enoch Dauge who lived here with his wife, Margaret Etheridge. Dauge subsequently changed his name to Dozier. He owned slaves. He built a loghouse, which burnt down in 1840.

The current house was built from 1840 to 1842. When Dozier died in 1842, it was inherited by his heirs, who eventually sold it in 1932. Five years later, in 1937, it was purchased by George Hobbs. It was designed in the Greek Revival architectural style. It has been listed on the National Register of Historic Places since November 1, 1990.
