= Golf at the Inter-Allied Games =

The golf competition at the Inter-Allied Games was held at La Boulie, the course of the Racing Club de Paris, Versailles, France from 2 to 12 July 1919. The event was open to all military personnel from countries that were among the Allies of World War I.

The competition consisted of two men's events. The events were originally intended to start on 24 June and to finish on 4 July but were delayed to allow the British team to compete. A team event was held on 2 and 3 July with an individual tournament from 7 to 12 July, after the official end of the games on 6 July.

For the team event, there were eight players in each team. Only three teams entered, France, Great Britain and the United States. Great Britain played United States on the first day with the winner playing France. There were four foursomes matches in the morning with eight singles in the afternoon. United States defeated Great Britain 7–5 but France won the final 8–4. The French team was: Baptiste Bomboudiac, Marius Cavallo, Maurice Daugé, Jean Gassiat, René Golias, Raymond Gommier, Eugène Lafitte and Arnaud Massy.

The individual contest started with two rounds of stroke-play on 7 and 8 July. The leading 16 players qualified for the knock-out match-play stage. The knock-out matches were over 36 holes, played from 9 to 12 July. 27 players competed in the qualifying, 11 from France and the United States and 5 from Britain. Of the 16 qualifiers, 8 were French, 7 from the United States and 1 from Britain. Two British players, Percy and Aubrey Boomer were disqualified for arriving late for one of the qualifying rounds. All four semi-finalist were French. In the semi-finals, Massy beat Gassiat by 2 holes and Daugé beat Gommier, 10 and 9. In the final Massy beat Daugé, 5 and 4.

== Medal summary ==
Event	Gold	Silver	Bronze
Individual	Arnaud Massy (FRA)	Maurice Daugé (FRA)	Not awarded
Team	France (FRA)	United States (USA)	Great Britain (GBR)
