= Monique Skidmore =

Australian medical and political anthropologist

Monique Maree Skidmore (born 11 May 1968) is an Australian medical and political anthropologist of Myanmar. She has served as a deputy vice-chancellor at the University of Queensland (2014-2016) and the University of Tasmania (2016-2018).

== Biography ==
Skidmore was born in Canberra, Australia and went on to earn a Bachelor of Arts and Bachelor of Science from the Australian National University and a Master of Arts and PhD in anthropology from McGill University, Canada.

Skidmore's work in anthropology began in Cambodia and combined religious, political and medical anthropology, exploring the psychological strategies Cambodians used to survive in the aftermath of the Khmer Rouge genocide. This work was awarded the international H.B.M. Murphy Prize in Medical Anthropology.

Skidmore moved to Montreal to pursue graduate studies in Southeast Asia and also studied the Burmese language at the University of Wisconsin. She received the Wenner Gren Foundation funding for doctoral fieldwork in Myanmar and in 1996 was given the first unrestricted fieldwork research visa for Burma (Myanmar) since the advent of military dictatorship in 1988.

Skidmore's work revealed the depths of fear, repression and self-censorship Burmese people suffered under successive Burmese military regimes and meticulously documents the many survival strategies used to remain hopeful for the future when terror and fear threaten to overwhelm the population. Karaoke Fascism: Burma and the Politics of Fear was published by University of Pennsylvania Press (a shorter article appeared in American Ethnologist), a book-length expose of living under a repression of fear in contemporary Myanmar.

Skidmore's work in Burma covered diverse cultural, medical, political, and religious aspects of everyday life at a time when the world was largely excluded from entering Myanmar and when foreigners were heavily restricted in their interactions with Burmese people and places. Skidmore worked and lived in peri-urban slums in Mandalay and Rangoon (Yangon) as well as the Yangon Psychiatric Hospital, Yangon Drug Rehabilitation Hospital, and the Yangon Traditional Medicine Clinic. Much of this work centred on the cultural beliefs and practices as well as structural inequalities and state repression that impact the psychological and psychiatric health of women and children.

=== Academic career ===
Skidmore began academic life as a tenured lecturer at the University of Melbourne and then as a senior postdoctoral research fellow in the Joan B. Kroc Institute for International Peacekeeping Studies at the University of Notre Dame. After winning several Australia Research Council Grants, Skidmore returned to Australia to work as a research and Associate Dean Research at the Australian National University. It was here that she developed an interest in the relevance of public anthropology to her ongoing interest in contemporary conflicts.

Skidmore went on to hold executive leadership positions in Australian universities including Dean and Pro Vice-Chancellor International at the University of Canberra from 2008, Deputy Vice-Chancellor International and Vice-President of the University of Queensland from 2014, and Deputy Vice-Chancellor Global and Vice-President of the University of Tasmania in 2016. In 2021 she became a Research Professor in the Alfred Deakin Institute for Citizenship and Globalisation, Deakin University and a Board Member and the Director of the Australia Myanmar Institute.

== Publications ==
- Ware, Anthony; Skidmore, Monique (2023). After the Coup: Myanmar's Political and Humanitarian Crises. Canberra: Asia Pacific Press: Australian National University E Press. ISBN 9781760466138
- Skidmore, Monique (2004). "Burmese". Encyclopedia of Medical Anthropology. pp. 607–614. doi:10.1007/0-387-29905-X_61. ISBN 978-0-306-47754-6.
- Skidmore, Monique (2013). "Behind bamboo fences: forms of violence against women in Myanmar". In Bennett, Linda Rae; Manderson, Lenore (eds.). Violence Against Women in Asian Societies: Gender Inequality and Technologies of Violence. Routledge. pp. 76–92. ISBN 978-1-136-87562-5.
- Skidmore, Monique (9 July 2002). "Menstrual Madness: Women's Health and Well-Being in Urban Burma". Women & Health. 35 (4): 81–99. doi:10.1300/J013v35n04_06. PMID 12216994. S2CID 43887056.
- Skidmore, Monique (2008). "Contemporary medical pluralism in Burma". Dictatorship, Disorder and Decline in Myanmar. doi:10.22459/DDDM.12.2008.11. ISBN 978-1-921536-32-8.
- Skidmore, Monique; Wilson, Trevor, eds. (2008). Dictatorship, Disorder and Decline in Myanmar. ANU Press. doi:10.22459/dddm.12.2008. ISBN 978-1-921536-32-8.
- Burma at the Turn of the 21st Century. University of Hawai'i Press. 2005. ISBN 978-0-8248-2857-8. JSTOR j.ctt6wqsf4.
- Cheesman, Nick; Skidmore, Monique; Wilson, Trevor (2012). Myanmar's Transition: Openings, Obstacles, and Opportunities. Institute of Southeast Asian Studies. ISBN 978-981-4414-16-6.
- Cheesman, Nick; Skidmore, Monique; Wilson, Trevor (2010). Ruling Myanmar: From Cyclone Nargis to National Elections. Institute of Southeast Asian Studies. ISBN 978-981-4311-47-2.
- Skidmore, Monique; Wilson, Trevor; Myanmar/Burma Update Conference (2007). Myanmar: the state, community and the environment. Canberra: Asia Pacific Press : Australian National University E Press. ISBN 978-0-7315-3811-9. OCLC 171113250.
- Skidmore, Monique (July 2003). "Medical assistance and refugee safety in contemporary conflicts". The Lancet. 362 (9377): 75. doi:10.1016/S0140-6736(03)13814-7. PMID 12854586. S2CID 29015225.
