= Monique Richard (climber) =

Canadian mountain climber

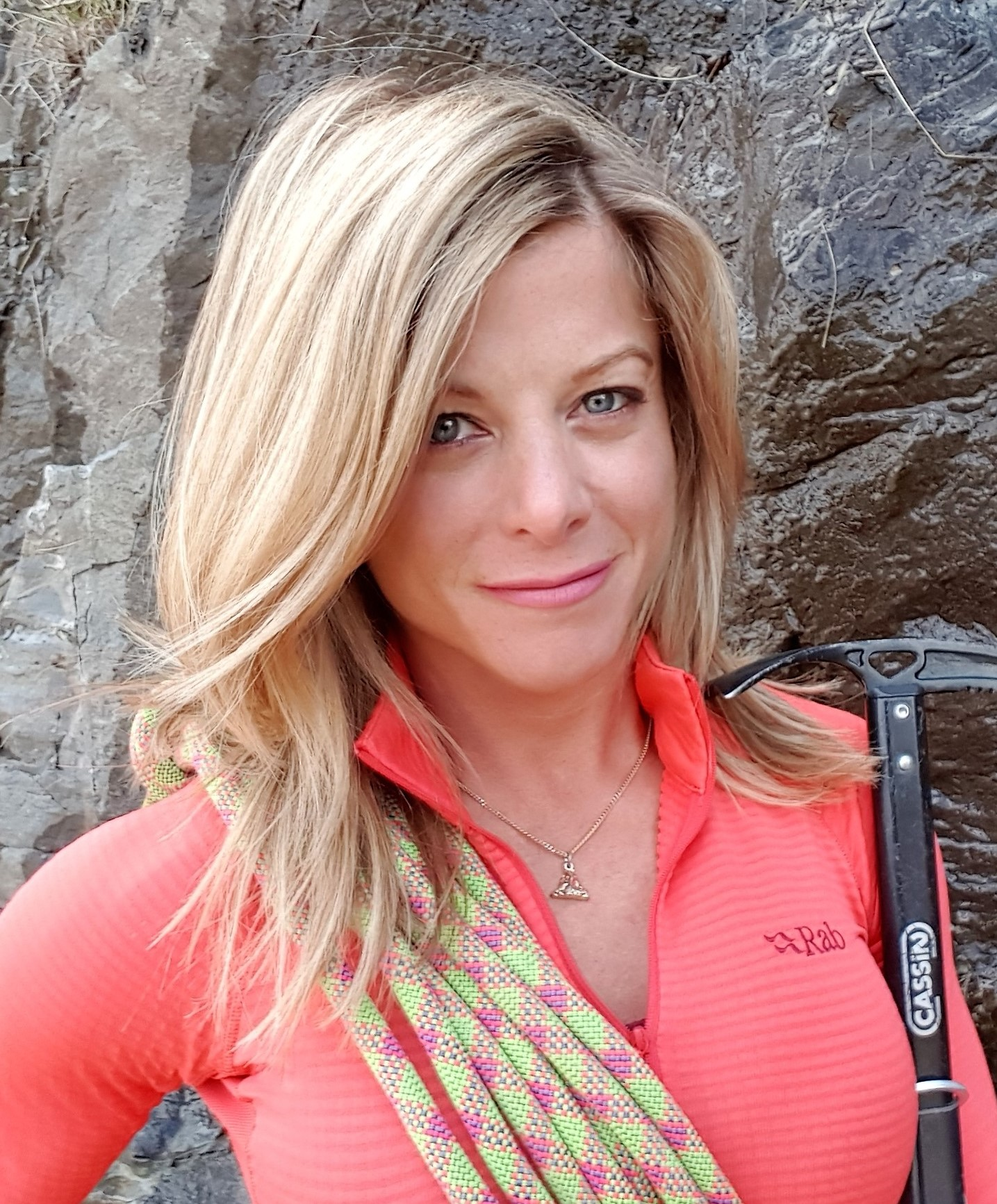
- Richard in 2019

Personal information
- Nationality: Canadian
- Born: 1975 (age 50–51)

Climbing career
- Type of climber: Alpine climbing; Expedition climbing; Solo climbing
- Known for: First woman to solo climb Mount Logan, first Canadian woman to summit Mt Makalu

Monique Richard (born 1975) is a Canadian mountaineer.

== Biography ==
Born in Montreal, Richard grew up in poverty and spent part of her childhood in foster care. She experienced physical and psychological abuse and developed an interest in sports at an early age.

Before pursuing mountaineering, Richard worked various low-wage jobs and developed an interest in literature, art, and international travel.

Richard moved to Switzerland after accepting a yearlong position as a nanny for a Swiss family. She traveled throughout Europe during her stay, which she extended by six months.

After returning to Quebec, she obtained a degree in arts and literature and continued traveling.

In 2006, Richard sold a café she co-owned and traveled to Europe, where she walked 1,600 km along the Camino de Santiago over eight weeks.

After returning to Quebec, Richard began working as a letter carrier for Canada Post.

She discovered mountains later, during her hike of the GR20 in Corsica when she was 34 years old.

Richard's first high-altitude climb was Kilimanjaro in 2009. She later joined an expedition to Mount Elbrus in Russia, followed by a visit to Mount Everest Base Camp and an ascent of Aconcagua. She went on to complete the Seven Summits.

== Notable ascents ==
=== The Seven Summits ===
Richard completed the Seven Summits in 2012 when she summited Mount Everest.

She completed the seven summits in 32 months, which is the Canadian women's record for the time taken to complete the seven climbs.

Year	Mountain	Notes
2009	Kilimanjaro 5,892 m (19,331 ft)	Richard's first experience in high altitude.
2010	Elbrus 5,642 m (18,510 ft)	
2011	Aconcagua 6,962 m (22,841 ft)	Ascent completed in difficult conditions due to a very fast climb and acute mountain sickness.
2011	Denali 6,190 m (20,310 ft)	
2011	Puncak Jaya 4,884 m (16,024 ft)	(Also called Cartensz Pyramid.) Off season, no helicopter is available to transport her to base camp. It takes her 6 days to walk there in torrential rains through the jungle. On her return, due to a civil war and the risk of violence, she is forced to cross a mining zone and is sequestered for 6 days in a container.
2011	Vinson Massif 4,892 m (16,050 ft)	
2012	Everest 8,848 m (29,029 ft)	Second attempt, from the South side, 6 months after a first expedition in October 2011.

=== The 8000ers ===
Richard has participated in five expeditions on 8000 m peaks in the Himalayan and Korakoram ranges.

==== Everest ====
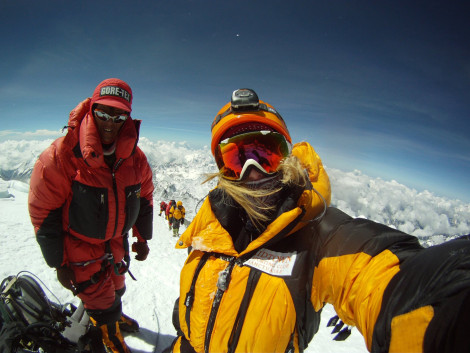
Richard and Tenzing Sherpa near the summit of Everest in 2012

She took part in three expeditions on Mount Everest.

	Date	Face	Altitude reached
1	October 2011	South face (Nepal)	7,300 m
2	May 2012	South face (Nepal)	8,848 m (summit)
3	May 2013	North face (Chine)	8,800 m

She made her first attempt on Everest on the Nepali side (south face) in October 2011, off-season. Only one other team of mountaineers was on the mountain at that time. In alpine style, she reaches Camp 3 (7,300 m) but turns back because of the weather conditions and the large amounts of snow. During the trek back, she injured her ankle.

On her second expedition in May 2012, she met Norwegian mountaineer Arvid Lahti, who will become her partner for several climbs around the world.

==== Makalu ====
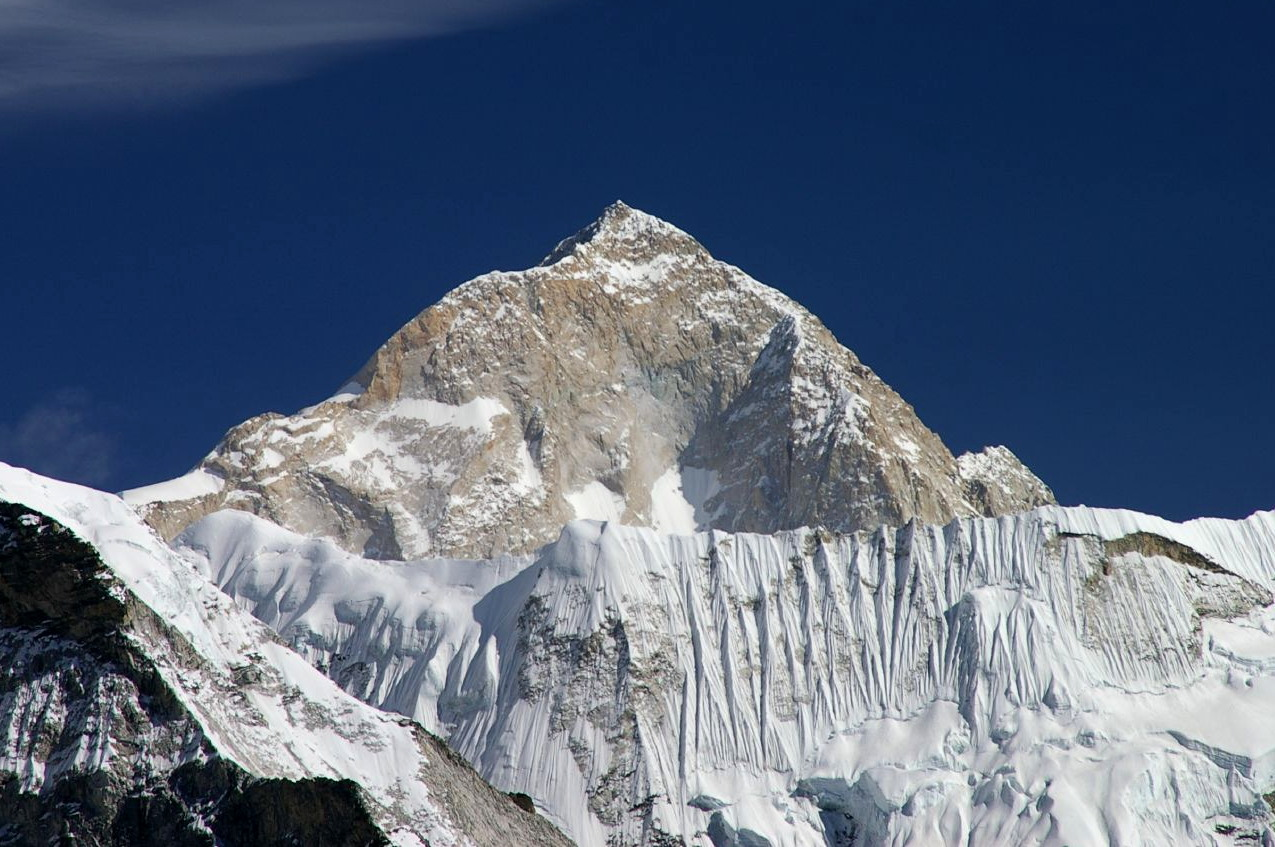
View of the south-west face of Makalu.

In 2014, she became the first Canadian woman to reach the top of the world's fifth highest mountain, Mt Makalu. She did it at the same time with Al Hancock, who became the first Canadian man to reach this summit. During this expedition, she comes close to death during the descent because of an airway obstruction while in the death zone.

==== K2 ====
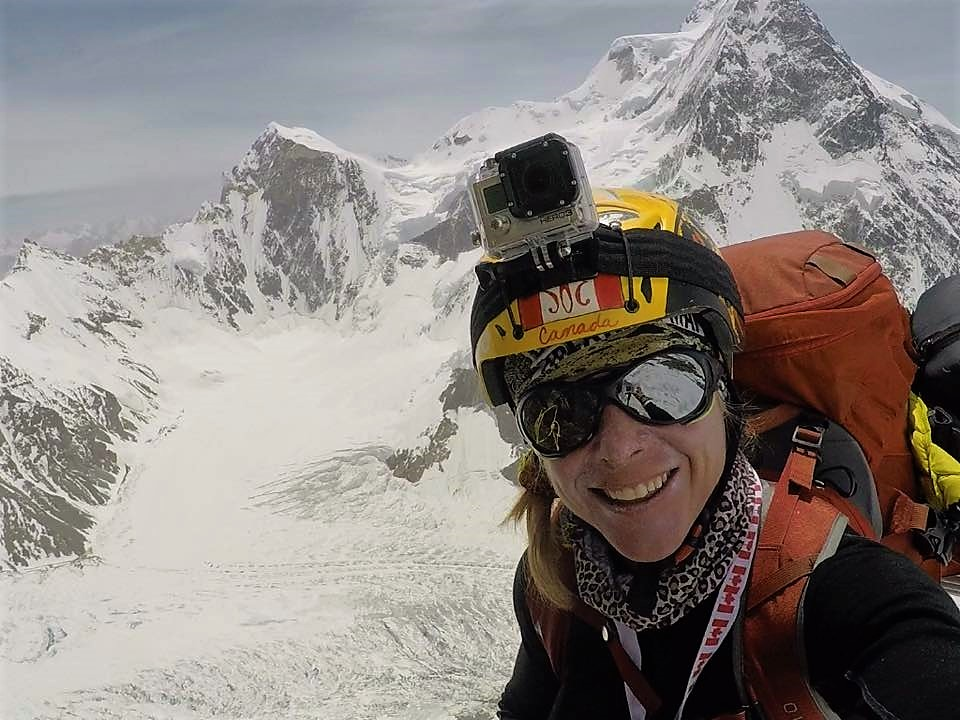
Monique Richard on K2 in 2015

In 2015, she made an attempt on K2 where she reached the altitude of 7,300 m. Due to the weather conditions and avalanche danger, she had to turn back. Nobody reached the summit that year.

These five climbs were done with the use of supplemental oxygen. On Everest in 2013, she attempted a climb without supplemental oxygen but eventually decided to use it in the upper sections of the mountain. She ultimately decided to turn back very close to the summit, at an altitude of 8,800 m, because of external factors that affected her psychologically; especially the many corpses found on this route back then.

=== Mount Logan solo ===
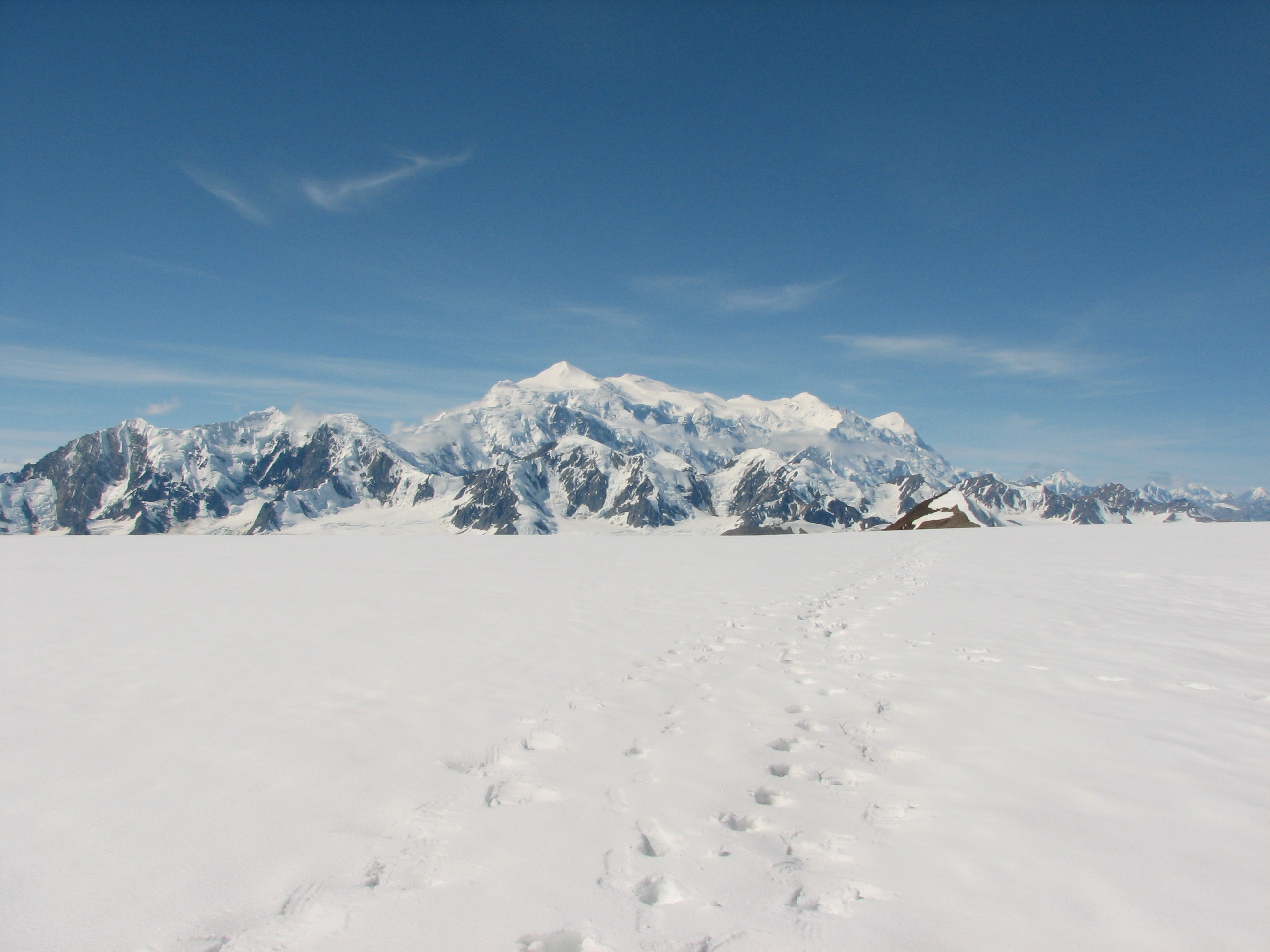
View of Mount Logan from the Kluane icefield.

In 2017, the year of the 150th anniversary of Canada, she made a first attempt on this mountain with a companion. They reached the summit plateau but had to turn back at an altitude of about 5,500 m.

On May 30, 2018, at 2:38 pm, Richard reached the summit of the highest mountain in Canada, Mount Logan, from the west side (Kings Trench).

She is the first woman in the world to have reached the top of this mountain solo. She required a rescue after reaching the summit. Richard's ascent was the first solo to the summit by a woman, though her subsequent rescue leaves the door open for a complete solo ascent and descent.

In 2018, a year much less busy than the previous one, very few teams are on the mountain and she is the first climber flown at base camp. At no point during the expedition that lasted 19 days did another team found themselves in front of her. The solo expedition became a solitary climb.

In the spring of 2018, temperatures are particularly cold in this part of Yukon. To these conditions are added several hardships; broken equipment, fall into a crevasse, storms, avalanches.

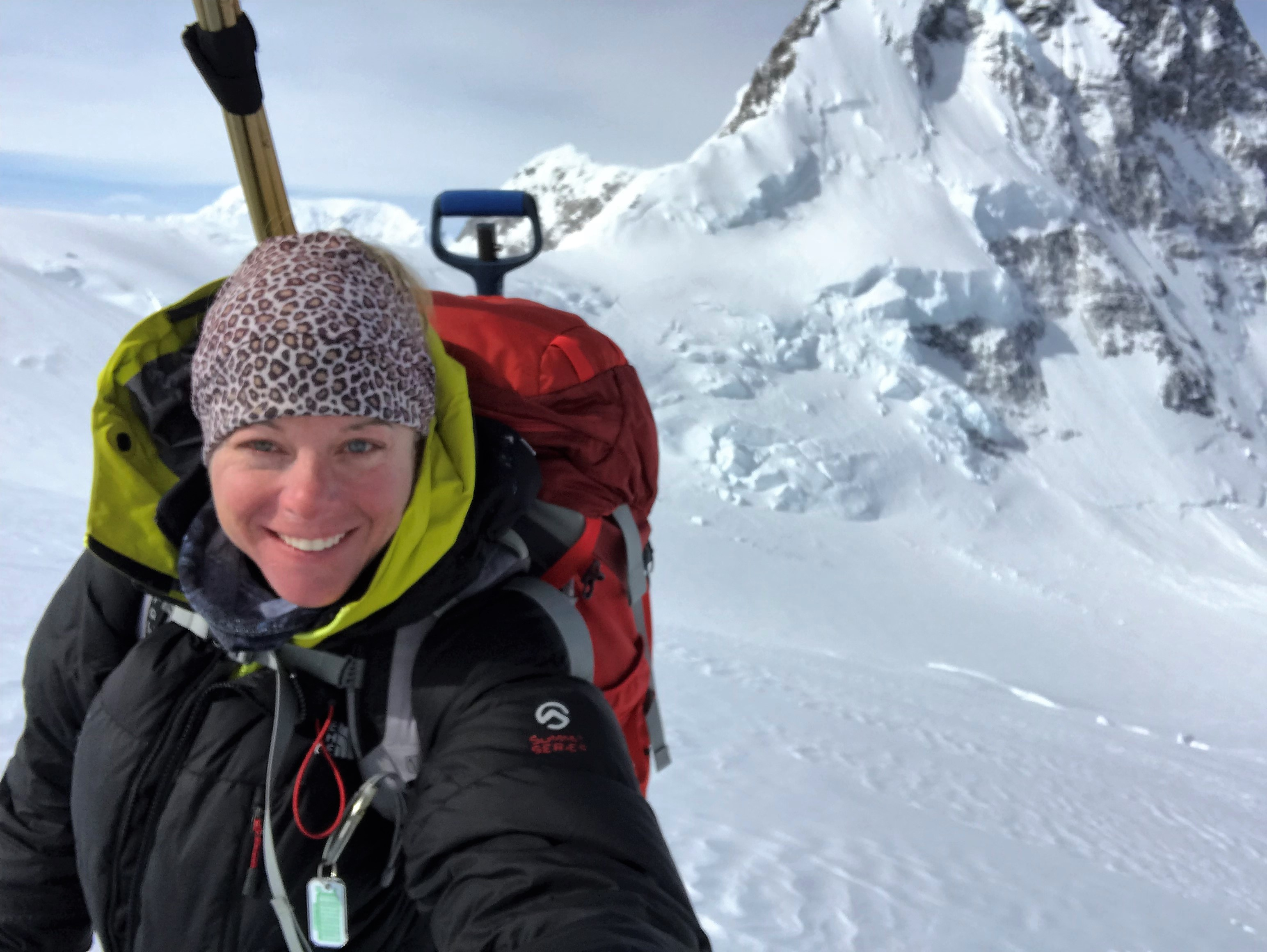
Richard during the 2018 solo expedition on Mount Logan (Kings Peak in the background)

After reaching the summit she required a rescue; she descended and made an unexpected detour of several kilometers that forced her to climb a 300 m sub-summit before finding her way. That day she covered a distance of 18 km in 14 hours on the summit plateau and found her bivouac around 1:30 am. The next day, she traversed the summit plateau (about 8 km) and returned to Prospector Col, where, recognizing a deteriorating situation due to weather forecasts, the physical effects of several days of fast ascent from Camp 3, equipment breakdowns and the post-traumatic memories of the tragic events that occurred on Rainier two years before, she made the decision to contact Parks Canada emergency services and request an evacuation.

The evacuation is difficult because Richard is at the operational limit of the aircraft used by the company mandated by Parks Canada for evacuation operations (approximately 5,500 m). Parks Canada then asked two other climbers who were on the mountain to assist Richard so that she could descend to a lower altitude to be evacuated. They managed to reach Richard at her bivouac where they found her weak but conscious and assisted her to ski down to camp 4 from where she was evacuated, at an altitude of about 5,200 m. In order to carry out the evacuation, the operations managers had to purchase additional equipment. The helicopter company has since acquired a new aircraft with a higher operational altitude (an Airbus AS350-B3e Squirrel) which allows it to reach all the upper parts of Mount Logan.

=== Other ascents ===
Since 2009, Richard had reached the summits of the following mountains with an altitude of more than 4,000 m around the world, and made dozens of other lower-altitude climbs in various mountain ranges, including the Canadian Rockies.

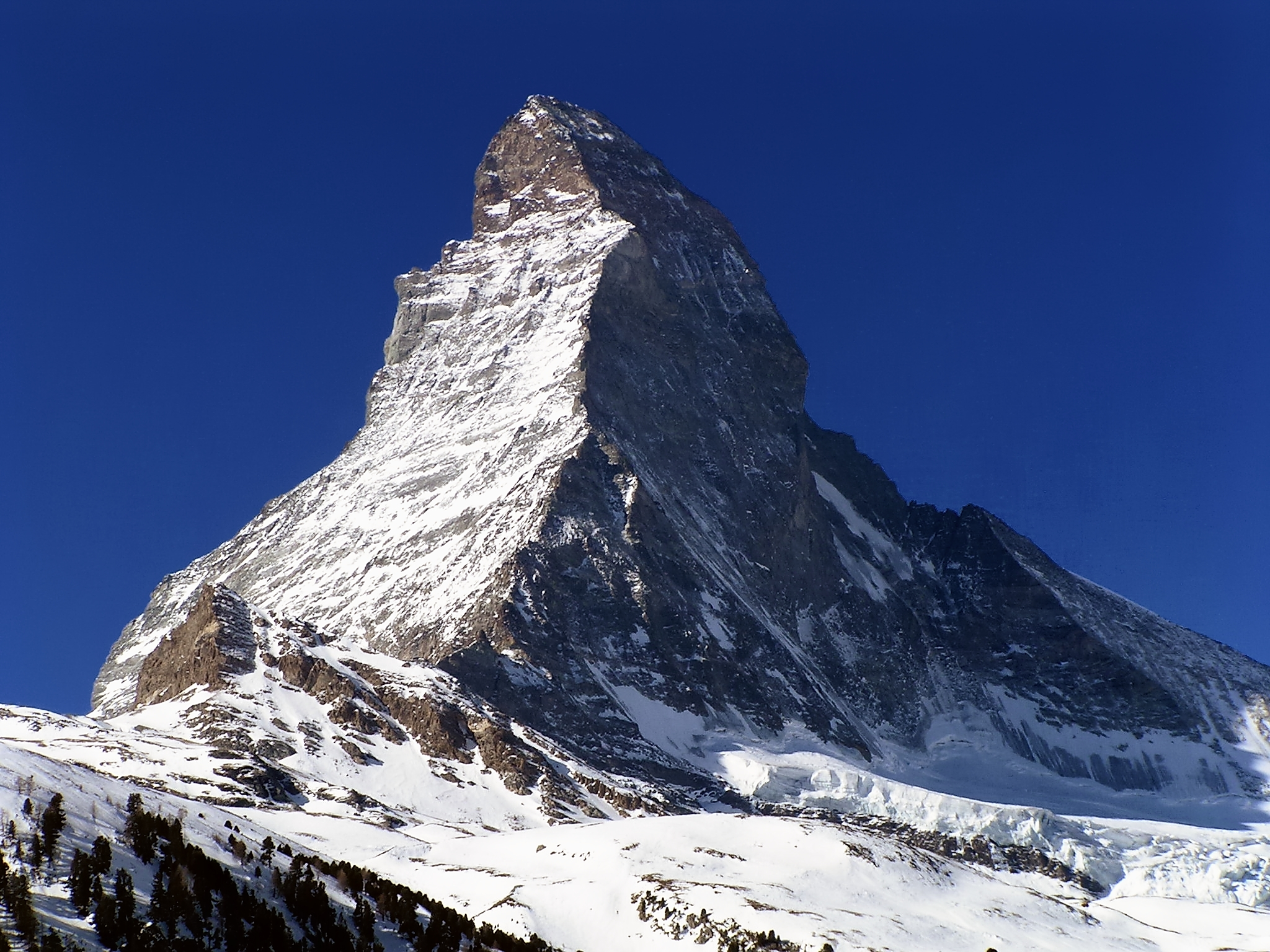
View of the Matterhorn with the Hörnli ridge separating the North face (right) and the East face (left)

Europe

- Mont Blanc, France 4,810 m (see below*)
- Alphubel, Switzerland 4,206 m
- Breithorn, Switzerland 4,164 m
- Castor, Switzerland 4,223 m
- Matterhorn, Switzerland 4,478 m
- Dent Blanche, Switzerland 4,357 m
- Fiescherhorn, Switzerland 4,049 m
- Jungfrau, Switzerland 4,158 m
- Mönch, Switzerland 4,107 m
- Monte Rosa, Switzerland 4,634 m
- Pollux, Switzerland 4,092 m

* In 2011, she climbed Mont Blanc from the Are (1,760 m), without using the Mont Blanc Tramway to approach the Gare du Nid d'Aigle (2,372 m) ). Off-season, she struggled to find a guide, but she managed to find one and they completed the round trip in less than 24 hours by the normal route.

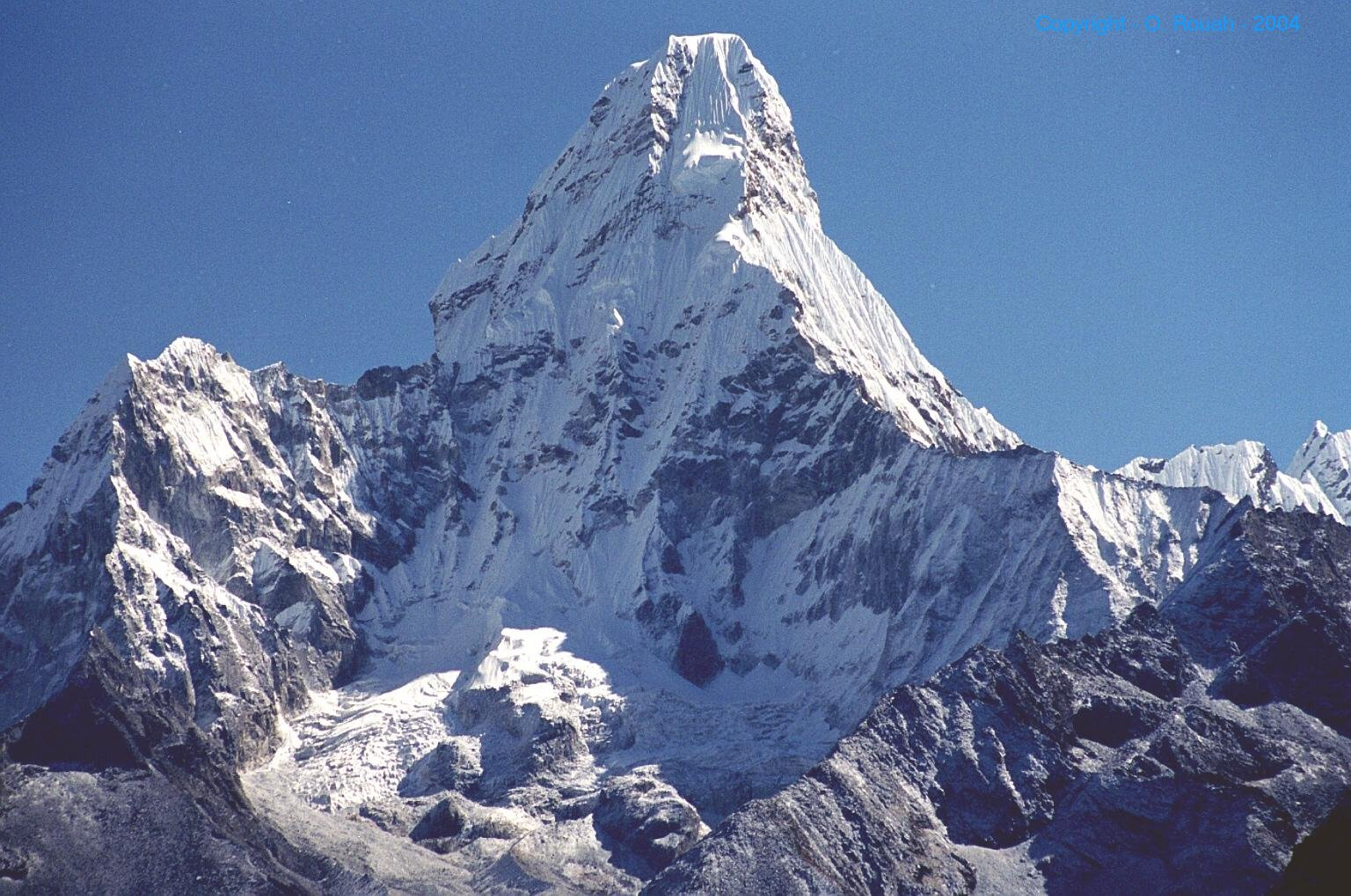
View of Ama Dablam from the village of Tengboche in the Khumbu Himal valley (Nepal).

Asia

- Ama Dablam, Nepal 6,812 m
- Imja Tse (Island Peak), Nepal 6,189 m
- Kala Patthar, Nepal 5,643 m
- Lobuche, Nepal 6,120 m

Africa

- Toubkal, Morocco 4,167 m

South America

- Alpamayo, Pérou 5,947 m
- Artesonraju, Pérou 6,025 m

North America

- Rainier, United States 4,392 m

== Mount Rainier accident ==
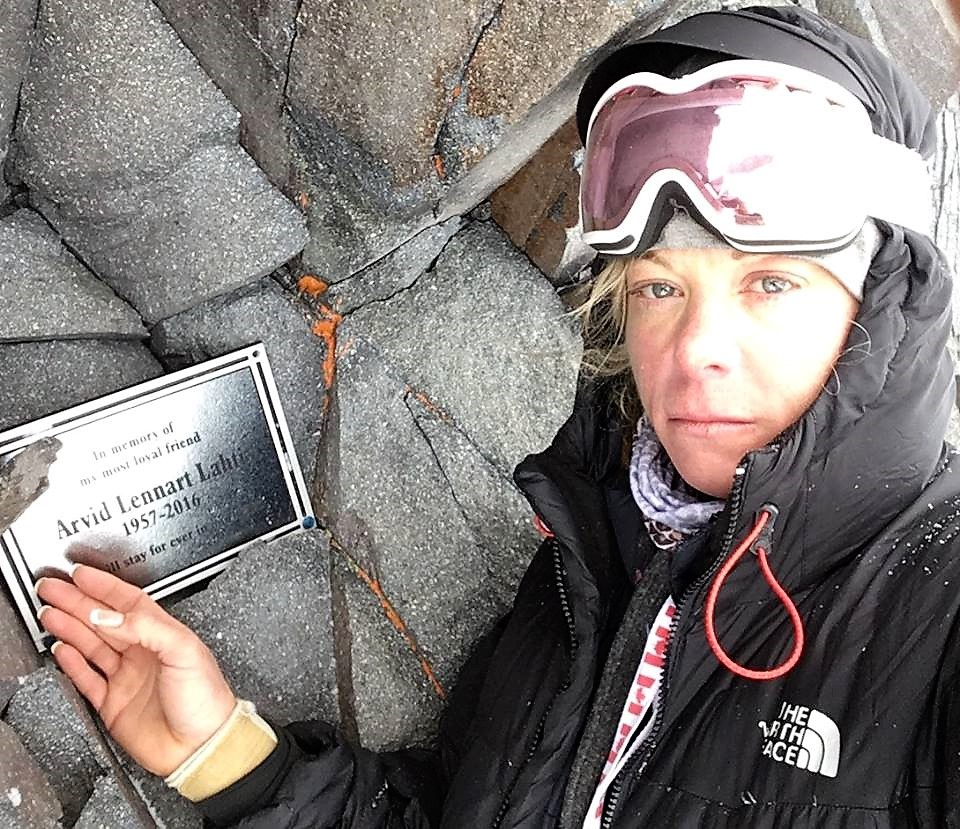
Plaque installed on Mount Rainier by Monique Richard in tribute to Arvid Lahti.

On March 26, 2016, Richard and Norwegian mountaineer Arvid Lahti were caught in a storm while descending Mount Rainier. They sheltered near Gibraltar Ledges, where Lahti died of hypothermia overnight. Richard also developed hypothermia.

The following day, Richard was helped to the shelter at Camp Muir. She was airlifted to a hospital on March 28.

Richard returned to Mount Rainier the following year to install a commemorative plaque near Camp Muir.

A short film produced in 2017 on the life of Richard, "L'affront des cimes", relates this accident and the impact it had on her.

== Physical training ==
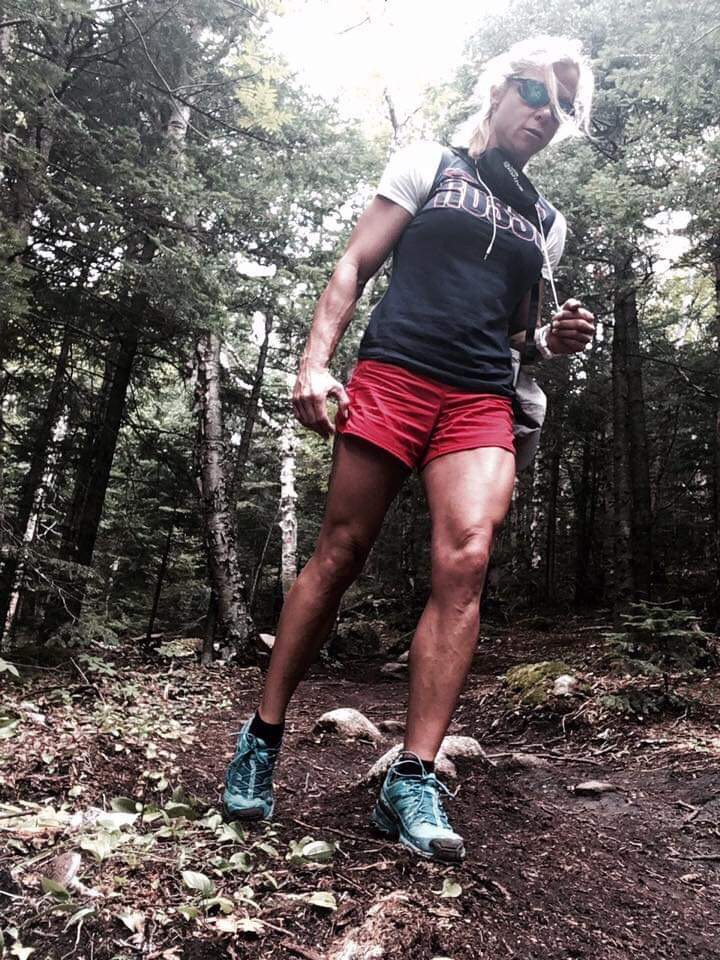
Richard training

In preparation for her 2012 Everest expedition, Richard's training included running, weight training, and sessions on a stair-climbing machine while carrying a 10-kilogram (22 lb) backpack.

Before her 2018 Mount Logan expedition, she used a climbing exercise machine at home and trained in the mountains around Montreal.

== Conferences ==
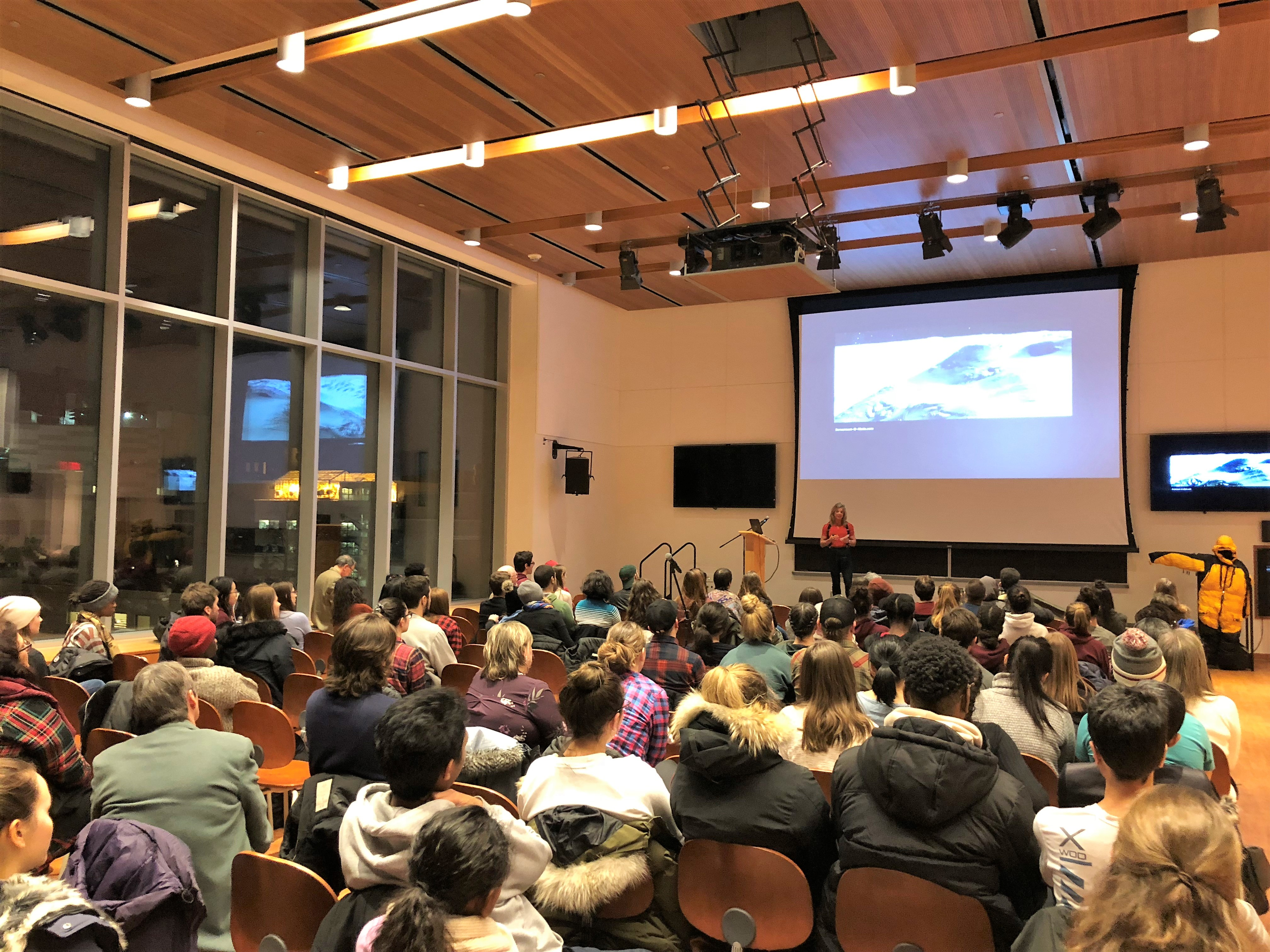
Richard presenting her "Logan Solo" conference to university students (2018)

For several years, Richard has been presenting lectures to various audiences in community, school, college, university and corporate environments to share her passion and inspire people.

Her conferences focus on the themes of motivation, surpassing oneself and self-confidence, the place of women and girls in society, her expeditions, including her solo climb on Mount Logan, health and safety, and on the awareness and the fight against bullying and violence towards children.

== Philanthropy ==
After her sister was diagnosed with this condition, Richard collaborated with the Quebec Association of Fibromyalgia (now the Société québécoise de la fibromyalgie) to raise public awareness about this syndrome which affects about 2 to 3% of the Canadian population.

In 2019, Richard decided to join the fight against bullying and violence against children and make this her favorite cause.

== Annexes ==
=== Filmography ===
Documentary : "L'affront des cimes" Film by Florence Pelletier and Caroline Coté (Canada) 2017 – 11 minutes

=== Documentary ===
"Alexis le randonneur" TVA Sports 2019 – 30 minutes

== See also ==
- Climbing
- List of climbers and mountaineers
- Eight-thousander
