= Monique Mujawamariya =

Rwandan activist in Canada (born 1955)

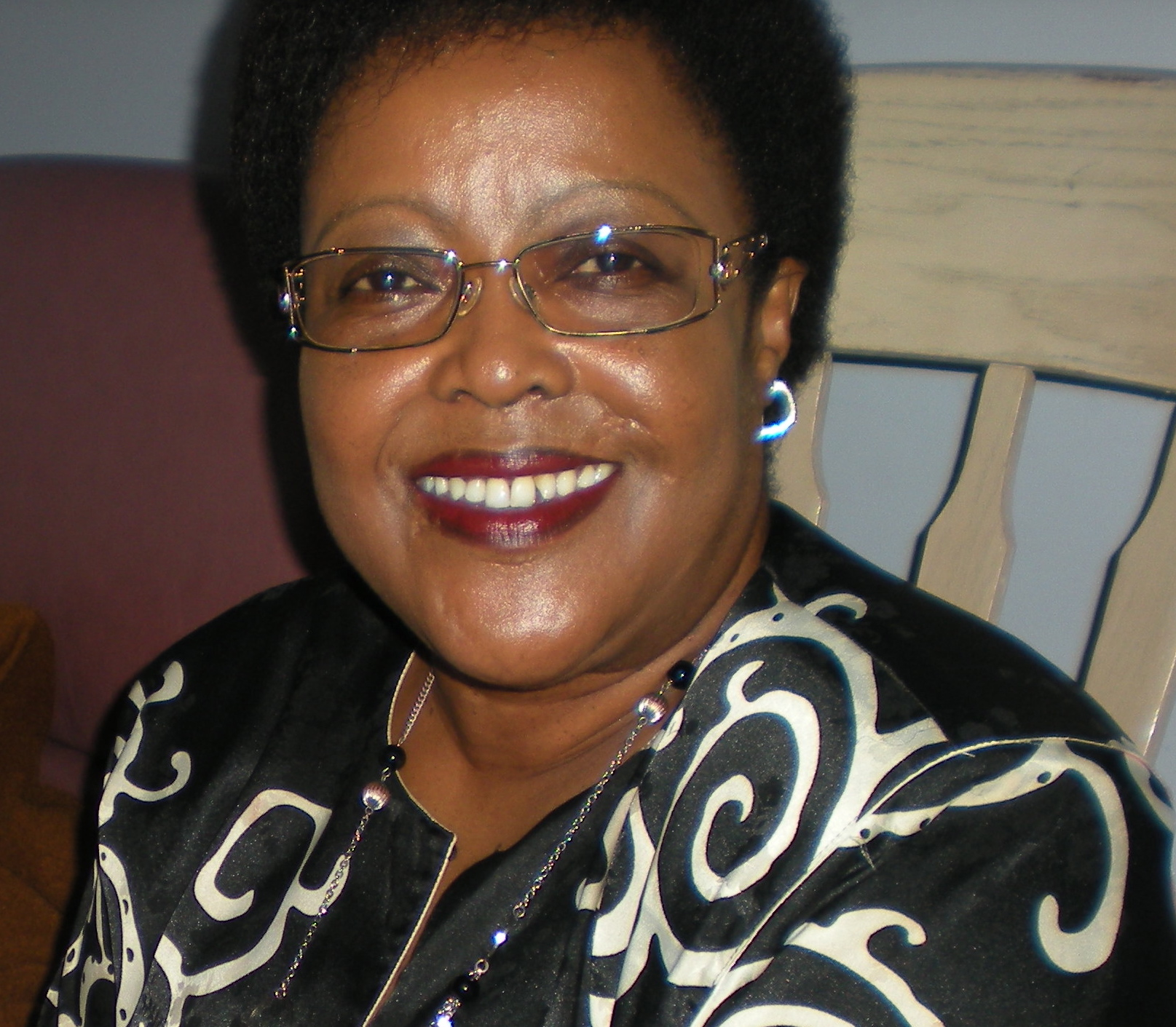
- Born: July 27, 1955 (age 70); Butare, Rwanda
- Known for: Human rights activism

Hon. Dr. Monique Mujawamariya (born 27 July 1955) is a Rwandan human rights activist who moved to Canada and then South Africa. She was a survivor of the Rwandan genocide and she won an international award in 1995. In 2014 she was living in South Africa where she is concerned with women's rights.

== Life ==
Mujawamariya was born in Butare in Rwanda in 1955. She became concerned with human rights and formed the Rwandan ADL (French: Association rwandaise pour la Défense de la personne et des Libertés publiques).

== The genocide ==
On the 6 April 1994, the Rwandan President Juvenal Habyarimana died when his aircraft was shot down and this event immediately preceded what was to be known as the Rwandan genocide in which an estimated 800,000 to 1,000,000 people are thought to have died. Mujawamariya was a targeted figure in Kigali, where Radio Télévision Libre des Mille Collines called her a "bad patriot who deserves to die". She was in communication with Alison Des Forges every 30 minutes because of this threat and the aircrash. Des Forges was a member of Human Rights Watch and she was told to look after her children when Mujawamariya ended the call to avoid her friend hearing her die. As it was, Mujawamariya survived.

Mujawamariya managed to escape by running into her garden until the soldiers left. She then hid in a roof space for 40 hours before brazenly approaching the soldiers armed only with a picture of her late husband in uniform. After she had paid a substantial bribe, she was able to escape and contact Des Forges. Des Forges arranged for her to be put on a list for evacuation, and she escorted Mujawamariya through the soldiers who surrounded the airport. Mujawamariya escaped, having sent her children to the south of the country. Weeks later, she still did not know what had happened to her three children.

Mujawamariya was able to fly to Washington, where she met Anthony Lake who was an advisor to President Clinton. She had been amongst a group who had met Clinton the previous December. However, there was little sympathy as it was judged that Rwanda, and its problems, were outside of America's national interest.

She was awarded the Democracy Award from the National Endowment for Democracy in 1995, and the same year she was given an honorary doctorate by Amherst College.

== Today ==
Mujawamariya now (2014) lives in Cape Town where she works on issues relating to women's rights. She returned to Rwanda to attend her son William's wedding in 2014.
