= Monique de Saint-Martin =

French sociologist

Monique de Saint-Martin (born 1940) is a French sociologist.

== Introductio ==
She is a retired director of studies at the Ecole des Hautes Etudes en Sciences Sociales (EHESS). Monique de Saint-Martin is known for her work with Pierre Bourdieu. The focus of her research is on the sociology of elites, the sociology of the Grandes écoles and the sociology of employers. Prior to her position at the EHESS, she was involved with the Laboratory Council of the Center for the Study of Social Movements from 2005 to 2008.

== Publications ==
Articles

- —; Bourdieu, Pierre (October 1976). "Anatomie du goût". Actes de la recherche en sciences sociales (in French). 2 (5): 4–112.
- —; Bourdieu, Pierre (September 1987). "Agrégation et ségrégation: le champ des grandes écoles et le champ du pouvoir". Actes de la recherche en sciences sociales (in French) (69): 2–50.
- —; Bourdieu, Pierre (March–April 1978). "Le patronat". Actes de la recherche en sciences sociales (in French) (3–62): 4–112.
- —; Bourdieu, Pierre (November 1982). "La sainte famille: L'épiscopat français dans le champ du pouvoir". Actes de la recherche en sciences sociales (in French) (40–45): 2–54.
- —; Bourdieu, Pierre (January–March 1970). "L'excellence scolaire et les valeurs du système d'enseignement français". Annales (Paris) (in French). 25 (1): 147–175.
- — (January 2008). "Les recherches sociologiques sur les grandes écoles: de la reproduction à la recherche de justice". Éducation et sociétés (in French) (5): 95–103.
- — (2000). "Vers une sociologie des aristocrates déclassés". Cahiers d'histoire (in French). 45 (4).

Books

- L'espace de la noblesse, Paris, Métailié, 1993
- (with M. D. Gheorghiu), Éducation et frontières sociales, Un grand bricolage, Paris, Michalon, 2011
- (with P. Bourdieu), La sainte famille. L'épiscopat français dans le champ du pouvoir, Paris, Raisons d'agir, 2025
