= Monique Mukuna Mutombo =

Congolese politician

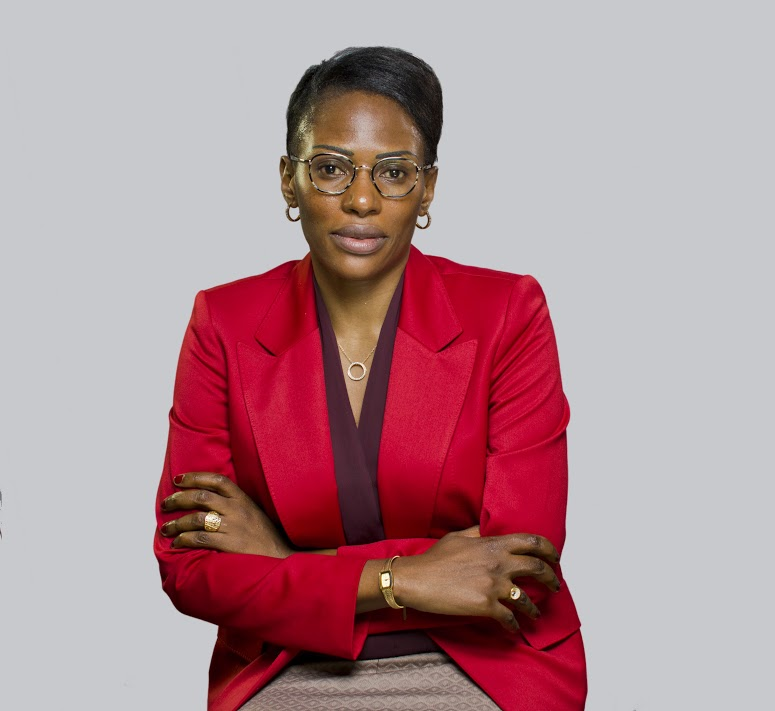
- Born: February 11, 1974 (age 52)
- Education: University of Liverpool
- Occupation: Business leader
- Known for: Candidate in the 2016 Democratic Republic of the Congo general election

Monique Mukuna Mutombo (born 11 February 1974) is a Congolese politician. She declared her independent candidacy for the 2016 presidential election in March that year. Mutombo has been critical of the leadership of President Joseph Kabila.

== Early life ==
Monique Mukuna Mutombo attended the University of Liverpool, United Kingdom, where she graduated with a business management degree. She was the head of a South African multinational company for five years, and has worked in the election office within Katanga Province.

== Political career ==
Mutombo entered politics in 2016 when she announced herself as an independent candidate for the 2016 presidential election in the Democratic Republic of Congo in March that year through an open letter. In an interview with Africa Review, she referred to the work completed by Ellen Johnson Sirleaf, President of Liberia, and added "the solution to the instability in the DR Congo is not the exclusive preserve of men. Women can even do it better. Women have proven to be good managers during periods of strife and conflict." She remains the sole woman, out of the five candidates who have nominated themselves for the election.

She was critical of the changes President Joseph Kabila has made to extend his rule past the end of his second term. She also accused him of human rights abuses, and withholding the natural wealth of the country from the common people for the benefit of himself and his friends. Mutombo had previously believed Étienne Tshisekedi was the correct person to lead the country, but following his alliance with Moïse Katumbi, she changed her mind.

== Personal life ==
Mutombo is a mother with two children.
