= Monique Pantel =

French film critic and journalist (1932–2021)

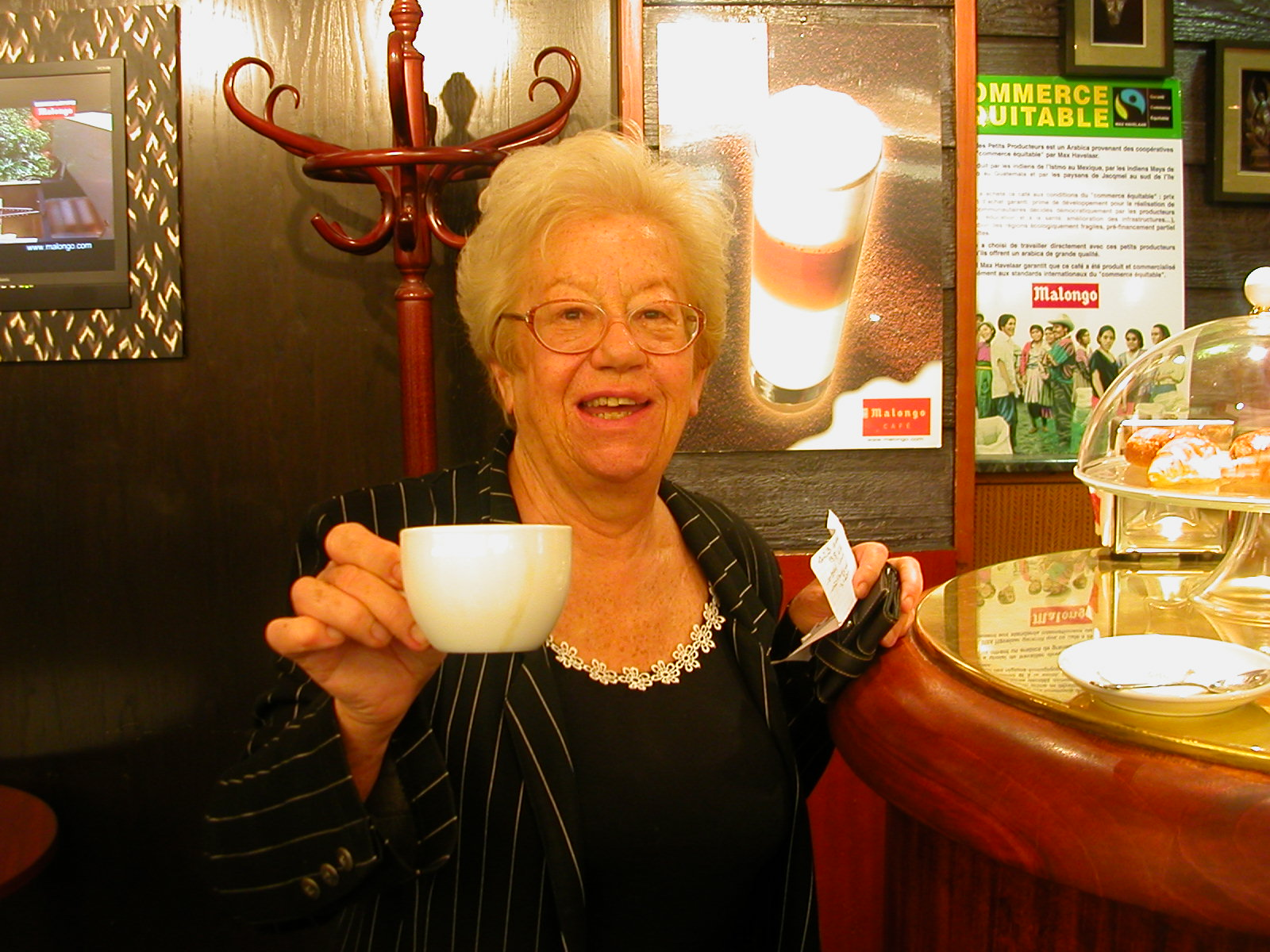
- Pantel in 2006
- Born: 11 December 1932; Mont-de-Marsan, France
- Died: 7 April 2021 (aged 88); Paris, France
- Occupations: film critic and journalist

Monique Pantel (11 December 1932 – 7 April 2021) was a French film critic and journalist. She worked for RTL, France Inter and Europe 1.

Born into a family of hoteliers, she left Mont-de-Marsan to become a hotel receptionist in England, then in Paris. There she meets the playwright Jacques Audiberti, for an interim secretary contract, and becomes her companion during the last three years of her life. He introduces her to the Paris-Presse newspaper in July 1964, and she writes for the entertainment section of France-Soir after the merger of the two dailies. There, the impertinent journalist, often blundering, takes the nickname of "Panpan". She interviews several American actors when they come to France: Arnold Schwarzenegger, Richard Gere, Shirley MacLaine, etc.

When her first book came out in 1994, she was invited on to Laurent Ruquier's radio programme, who appreciates her outspokenness and her humor, and offers her to give a phone report of the Deauville Festival, in 1997. This radio experience continues with her weekly intervention on Wednesdays, in Dans tous les sens on France Inter, then on Fridays in On va s'gêner on Europe 1, where she gives her opinion on the films released during the week, until 2014. In 1999, she publishes a book of memories and anecdotes about the film industry, Panpan fait son cinoche.

After the resumption of the show Les Grosses Têtes on RTL by Laurent Ruquier in September 2014, Monique Pantel is occasionally invited as a guest to give her opinion by phone on a specific film.

After her death on 7 April 2021 in Paris, aged 88, a tribute is paid to her on social networks, notably by Laurent Ruquier and by the former president of the Cannes Film Festival Gilles Jacob.

== Bibliography ==
- 1994: La Chemise de nuit, éditions Anne Carrière (reedition in 2007)
- 1996: Des baisers pour l'hiver, éditions Anne Carrière
- 1999: Panpan fait son cinoche, éditions Anne Carrière

== Filmography ==
- 1981: L'Amour trop fort by Daniel Duval
- 1990: Tatie Danielle by Étienne Chatiliez
