= Monique Dauge =

French mathematician

Monique Dauge (born 1956) is a French mathematician and numerical analyst specializing in partial differential equations, spectral theory, and applications to scientific computing. She is an emeritus senior researcher at the French National Centre for Scientific Research (CNRS), associated with the University of Rennes 1.

== Education and career ==
Dauge was born on 6 October 1956 in Nantes, and earned a diploma and agrégation in 1978 at the University of Nantes. In 1980 she defended a doctoral thesis at Nantes, Etude de l’opérateur de Stokes dans un polygone : régularité, singularités et théorème d’indice, and in 1986 she completed her habilitation there with the habilitation thesis Régularités et singularités des solutions de problèmes aux limites elliptiques sur des domaines singuliers de type à coins, supervised by Lai The Pham.

Meanwhile, she became junior researcher for the CNRS in 1980, and researcher in 1984, both associated with the University of Nantes. In 1996 she became a director of research for the CNRS, and moved to the University of Rennes. She retired as an emeritus senior researcher in 2021.

== Selected publications ==
Dauge is the author of Elliptic boundary value problems on corner domains: Smoothness and asymptotics of solutions (Lecture Notes in Mathematics 1341, Springer, 1988). She is the coauthor of Spectral methods for axisymmetric domains: Numerical algorithms and tests (with Christine Bernardi and Yvon Maday, with contributions from Mejdi Azaïez, Gauthier-Villars, 1999). Her many research publications include the highly cited paper "Vector potentials in three‐dimensional non‐smooth domains" (with Chérif Amrouche, Christine Bernardi, and Vivette Girault, Mathematical Methods in the Applied Sciences, 1998).
