= Monique Cossard =

French-American educator

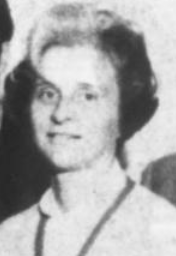
- Monique Cossard, from a 1968 publication of the U.S. State Department
- Born: Monique Jeanne Desvaux; November 20, 1921; Boissy St. Leger, France
- Died: April 4, 2023; United States
- Occupation(s): Educator, textbook writer

Monique Jeanne Desvaux Cossard (November 20, 1921 – April 4, 2023) was a French-American educator and textbook writer. She worked for the United States Department of State from 1951 to 1984, and was the author of several books on French language learning.

== Early life and education ==
Monique Desvaux was born in Boissy-Saint-Léger, France. She graduate from the University of Paris.

== Career ==
Cossard taught French in Paris. She moved to the United States in 1951, to teach French to American foreign service personnel in Washington, D.C. From 1957 to 1959, she was assistant director at the Foreign Service Institute in Nice, and from 1959 to 1962 directed the language program at the United States embassy in Paris. She became a Senior Instructor, and later head of the Romance Languages department, at the FSI Language Training Program in Rosslyn, Virginia, in the early 1960s. She was head of the Early Morning Language Program there, serving full-time government workers. She received a Meritorious Honor Award from the State Department in 1965, and she retired from the Foreign Service Institute in 1984.

== Publications ==
Cossard wrote or co-wrote several textbooks for French language learning.

- French basic course (1976, with Robert J. Salazar)
- French: Basic Course Units 13-24 Revised (1977, with Robert J. Salazar)
- Official Foreign Service Institute French Language Course (1994)
- French Sentences Vol.1: English & French (with Robert J. Salazar and Nik Marcel)
- French Sentences Vol.2: English & French (with Robert J. Salazar and Nik Marcel)
- Mastering French: Hear It, Speak It, Write It, Read It (1985, with Robert J. Salazar)

== Personal life ==
Monique Desvaux married Pierre Cossard in 1947. They had a son, Pierre-Yves. Her first husband before 1951. In 1997, she married again, to journalist and editor Frank Landt Dennis. He died in 2002. She died in 2023, at the age of 101.
