= Cossart =

Cossart is a surname. Notable people with the surname include:

- Ernest Cossart (1876–1951), English actor
- Gabriel Cossart (1615–1674), French historian
- Hugh Cossart Baker Jr. (1846–1931), Canadian businessman
- Hugh Cossart Baker Sr. (1818–1859), Canadian banker
- Linda de Cossart, English surgeon
- Pascale Cossart (born 1948), French bacteriologist
- Yvonne Cossart (1934–2014), Australian virologist,
