= Monika (given name) =

- Gender: Female

Origin
- Origin: Greek, Latin
- Meaning: Advisor, unique
- Region of origin: German, Scandinavian, Czech, Slovak, Polish, Slovenian, Croatian, Estonian, Macedonian, Lithuanian, Latvian, Hungarian, Serbian, Japanese, Albanian

Other names
- Related names: Monica, Moonika, Monique, Mona, Nika

Monika is a female name in German, Scandinavian, Czech, Slovak, Polish, Slovenian, Macedonian, Croatian, Estonian, Lithuanian, Latvian, Hungarian (Mónika) and Japanese which can also be seen in India. It is a variation of Monica, stemming from the word "advisor" in Latin and "unique" in Greek.

The Japanese name Monika (もにか) can be spelled as 望仁香, 愛虹華, 百仁香 etc.

== Notable people ==
- Monika Äijä (born 1963), Swedish alpine skier
- Monika Absolonová (born 1976), Czech singer and actress
- Monika Adamczyk-Garbowska, Polish literature expert and professor of humanistic studies
- Monika Aidelsburger, German quantum physicist
- Monika Antonelli (born 1959), American voice actor and librarian
- Monika Athare (born 1992), Indian long-distance runner
- Monika Auer (born 1957), Italian luger
- Monika Babok (born 1991), Croatian swimmer
- Monika Bader (born 1959), German alpine skier
- Monika Baer, German painter
- Monika Bagárová (born 1994), Czech singer
- Monika Bakale (born 1979), Congolese swimmer
- Mónika Balsai (born 1977), Hungarian actress
- Mónika Bartos (born 1975), Hungarian politician
- Monika Bauerlein, CEO of Mother Jones
- Monika Baumgartl, German woman photographer
- Monika Baumgartner (born 1951), German actress and theater director
- Monika Bayer (born 1967), Austrian swimmer
- Monika Bednarek, German-born Australian linguist
- Monika Beer (born 1968), Swiss gymnast
- Monika Beisner, German artist and book illustrator
- Monika Bejnar (born 1981), Polish sprinter
- Monika Beňová (born 1968), Slovak politician
- Monika Berberich (born 1942), West German terrorist
- Monika Bergmann, West German sprint canoer
- Monika Bergmann-Schmuderer (born 1978), German alpine skier
- Monika Berwein (born 1957), German former alpine skier
- Monika Bittl, (1963–2022), German writer and journalist
- Monika Beu (1963–2005), German volleyball player
- Monika Biskopstø (born 1994), Faroese footballer
- Monika Bittner (born 1988), German ice hockey player
- Monika Bociek (born 1996), Polish volleyball player
- Monika Boehm-Tettelbach (born 1941), German indologist
- Monika Bohge, German writer
- Monika Bolliger, Swiss journalist and author
- Monika Bolly (born 1968), Polish actress
- Monika Borgmann (born 1963), German-Lebanese filmmaker and activist
- Monika Borowicz (born 1982), Polish sprint canoer
- Monika Borzym (born 1990), Polish jazz singer
- Monika Bosilj (born 1985), Croatian basketball player
- Monika Bravo (born 1964), Colombian artist
- Monika Brodka (born 1988), Polish singer
- Monika Bronicka (born 1977), Polish former sailor
- Monika Brudlewsky (born 1946), German politician
- Monika Brüning (born 1951), German politician
- Monika Brzeźna (born 1991), Polish cyclist
- Monika Brzostek (born 1989), Polish beach volleyball player
- Monika Buczkowska, Polish operatic soprano
- Monika Bulanda (born 1983), musical artist
- Monika Bustamante, American actress
- Monika Bytautienė (born 1989), Lithuanian long-distance runner
- Monika Cassens (born 1953), East German badminton player
- Monika Chabel (born 1992), Polish rower
- Monika Chakma (born 2003), Bangladeshi football player
- Monika Chiang (born 1974), American fashion designer and businesswoman
- Monika Chochlíková (born 1996), Slovak muaythai fighter
- Monika Christodoulou (born 1985), Greek singer-songwriter, known mononymously as Monika
- Monika Ciecierska (born 1973), Polish basketball player
- Monika Conjar (born 1995), Croatian women's football forward
- Monika Correa (born 1938), Indian textile artist
- Monika Cvernová (born 1990), Czech footballer
- Monika Czernin (born 1965), Austrian writer and screenwriter
- Monika Czinano (born 2000), American basketball player
- Monika Dahlberg (born 1936), German actress
- Monika Dannemann (1945–1996), German figure skater and painter
- Monika Das, Indian politician
- Monika Denker, German footballer
- Monika Larsen Dennis (born 1963), Swedish sculptor
- Monika Deol, Canadian television personality
- Monika Dettwiler (born 1948), Swiss-Italian journalist and author
- Monika Devi (born 1983), Indian weightlifter
- Monika Draeger (born 1953), Canadian rower
- Monika Dukarska (born 1990), Polish-born Irish rower
- Mónika Dunai, Hungarian-French teacher and politician
- Monika Dutt, Canadian medical doctor
- Monika Eggens (born 1990), Canadian water polo player
- Monika Ertl (1937–1973), German-Bolivian communist militant and guerrilla fighter
- Monika Fagerholm (born 1961), Finnish author
- Monika Falej (born 1972), Polish politician
- Monika Fašungová (born 1988), Slovak badminton player
- Monika Feldmann (born 1951), German figure skater
- Monika Felizeter (born 1977), Austrian rower
- Monika Fiafialoto (born 1965), French javelin thrower
- Monika Fikerle (born 1974), Australian musician
- Monika Fleischmann (born 1950), German research artist, digital media scientist, and curator
- Monika Fornaçon (born 1964), German football referee
- Monika Forstinger (born 1963), Austrian businesswoman and former politician
- Monika Frandofert (born 1991), Polish artistic gymnast
- Monika Frimmer (born 1955), German soprano in opera and concert
- Monika Gachevska (born 1974), Bulgarian sprinter
- Monika Germann (born 1954), Swiss cross-country skier
- Monika Gibalová, Slovak politician
- Monika Gollner (born 1974), Austrian high jumper
- Monika González-Hermosillo (born 1995), Mexican swimmer
- Mónika Grábics (born 1976), Hungarian chess player
- Monika Griefahn (born 1954), German politician
- Monika Grimm (born 1940), German singer and actress
- Monika Gruber (born 1971), German cabaret artist and actress
- Monika Grütters (born 1962), German politician
- Monika Grzebinoga (born 1985), Polish cyclist
- Mónika György (born 1982), Romanian cross-country skier
- Monika Hamann (born 1954), German sprinter
- Monika Harms (born 1946), German lawyer
- Monika Haselsberger (born 1976), Austrian sports shooter
- Monika Haukanõmm (born 1972), Estonian politician
- Monika Hausammann, Swiss writer
- Monika Hauser (born 1959), doctor specializing in gynecology
- Monika Heinold (born 1958), German politician
- Monika Hejtmánková (born 1967), Czech handball player
- Monika Helfer (born 1947), Austrian writer
- Monika Hellwig (1929–2005), German-born British academic, author, educator and theologian
- Monika Henzinger (born 1966), German computer scientist
- Monika Herzig (born 1964), musical artist
- Monika Hess (born 1964), Swiss alpine skier
- Monika Hestad (born 1977), Norwegian industrial designer and researcher
- Monika Hilker (born 1959), German biologist and professor
- Monika Hilmerová (born 1974), Slovak actress
- Monika Hoffman (born 1982), Swedish-Hungarian singer songwriter
- Monika Hohlmeier (born 1962), German politician
- Monika Hojnisz-Staręga (born 1991), Polish biathlete
- Monika Hunnius (1858–1934), German Baltic writer
- Monika Ivantysynova, German American engineer
- Monika Ivkic (born 1989), Bosnian-Austrian singer
- Monika Jančová (born 1992), Czech slalom canoeist
- Monika Janeska (born 1993), Macedonian female handballer
- Monika Jansson (born 1960), Swedish curler
- Mónika Járomi (born 1973), Hungarian Paralympic swimmer
- Monika Jarosińska (born 1974), Polish actress and singer
- Monika Jaruzelska (born 1963), Polish journalist, stylist and fashion designer
- Mónika Juhász Miczura (born 1972), Hungarian Roma singer
- Monika Juodeškaitė (born 1991), Lithuanian runner
- Monika Kadlecová (born 1990), Slovak cyclist
- Monika Kallies (born 1956), German rower
- Monika Karas, Hungarian journalist
- Monika Karsch (born 1982), German sport shooter
- Monika Kaserer (born 1952), Austrian alpine skier
- Monika Kaźmierczak, Polish carillonist
- Monika Kinley (1925–2014), British art dealer, collector and curator
- Mónika Király (born 1983), Hungarian cyclist
- Monika Kobylińska (born 1995), Polish handball player
- Monika Kompaníková, Slovak writer, editor and publisher
- Monika Silva Koniuszek, Polish activist
- Monika Kørra (born 1989), Norwegian author and former track and field athlete
- Monika Kos (born 1967), Australian journalist and television presenter
- Monika Kostera (born 1963), Polish academic
- Monika Kotzian, Polish Paralympic snowboarder
- Monika Kovač (born 1974), Croatian basketball player
- Mónika Kovács (born 1976), Hungarian alpine skier
- Mónika Kovacsicz (born 1983), Hungarian handball player
- Monika Krajewska, Polish-Jewish calligrapher
- Monika Krasteva (born 1999), Bulgarian volleyball player
- Monika Kratochvílová (born 1974), Czech tennis player
- Monika Krause-Fuchs (1941–2019), German university teacher
- Monika Krauze (born 1984), Polish tennis player
- Monika Krawczyk, Polish cyclist
- Monika Kropshofer (born 1952), German painter and photographer
- Monika Krupa (born 1977), Polish chess player
- Monika Kruse (born 1971), German techno DJ/producer and music producer
- Monika Kruszona (born 1985), German water polo player
- Monika Kryemadhi (born 1974), Albanian politician
- Monika Kühn (born 1967), German diver
- Monika Kunkelová (born 1977), Slovak wheelchair curler
- Monika Kuszyńska (born 1980), Polish singer
- Monika Kvaková (born 1988), Slovak ice hockey player
- Mónika Lakatos, Hungarian gypsy singer
- Mónika Lamperth (born 1957), Hungarian politician and jurist
- Monika Larsen Dennis (born 1963), Swedish sculptor
- Monika Lazar (born 1967), German politician
- Monika Lee (born 1992), American cosplayer
- Monika Lehmann, East German slalom canoeist
- Monika Leová (born 1991), Czech model and presenter
- Monika Leu (born 1973), German yacht racer
- Monika Leuenberger (born 1973), Swiss ice hockey player
- Monika Lewczuk (born 1988), Polish singer, songwriter, former model and beauty queen
- Monika Limane (1924–2010), Latgalian ceramicist
- Monika Linkytė (born 1992), Lithuanian singer
- Monika Liu (born 1988), Lithuanian singer
- Monika Lövgren, Swedish politician
- Monika Ludwig, Austrian mathematician
- Monika Lundi (1942–2025), German actress
- Monika Maciejewska (born 1970), Polish fencer
- Monika Maliczkiewicz (born 1988), Polish handball player
- Monika Malik (born 1993), Indian field hockey player
- Monika Mann (1910–1992), German novelist
- Monika Marach (born 2004), Polish weightlifter
- Monika Margeta, Swedish pool player
- Monika Maron (born 1941), German writer
- Monika Martin (born 1962), Austrian singer
- Monika Maštalířová (born 1977), Czech tennis player
- Monika Matysová (born 1981), Slovak footballer
- Monika Mauch, German soprano
- Monika Meißner (born 1953), German volleyball player
- Monika Merl (born 1979), German middle-distance runner
- Monika Merva, American photographer
- Monika Meyer (disambiguation), several people
- Monika Michalik (born 1980), Polish freestyle wrestler
- Monika Michaliszyn (born 1974), Polish politician
- Monika Michałów (born 1988), Polish handball player
- Monika Míčková (born 1991), Czech rhythmic gymnast
- Monika Migała (born 1987), Polish handball player
- Monika Mościbrodzka, Polish astrophysicist
- Monika Motsch (born 1942), German sinologist
- Monika Motyčáková, Slovak chess player
- Monika Mrklas (born 1942), German former cross-country skier and racing cyclist
- Monika Mrozowska (born 1980), Polish actress and singer
- Monika Mühlwerth (born 1954), Austrian politician
- Monika Mularczyk (born 1980), Polish football referee
- Monika Müller (born 1971), German synchronized swimmer
- Monika Müller-Seps, Swiss chess player
- Monika Mundu (born 1971), Indian playback singer and actor
- Monika Myszk (born 1982), Polish rower
- Monika Navickienė (born 1981), Lithuanian politician
- Monika Niederstätter (born 1974), Italian athlete
- Monika Olejnik (born 1956), Polish journalist
- Monika Oražem (born 1993), Slovenian triathlete
- Monika van Paemel (born 1945), Belgian writer
- Monika Panayotova (born 1983), Bulgarian politician
- Monika Paulikienė (born 1994), Lithuanian beach volleyball player
- Monika Pawłowska (born 1983), Polish politician
- Monika Pedersen (born 1978), Danish singer
- Monika Peikert (born 1952), German pentathlete
- Monika Pflug (born 1954), German speed skater
- Monika Piazzesi, American academic
- Monika Piel (born 1951), German television journalist and radio journalist
- Monika Piesliakaitė (born 1995), Lithuanian footballer
- Monika Pikuła, Polish actress
- Monika Pisankaneva, Bulgarian lecturer and LGBT activist
- Monika Płatek (born 1953), Polish legal scholar, criminologist and politician
- Monika Pogladič (born 1987), Slovenian ski jumper
- Monika Pulch (born 1949), German fencer
- Monika Puskeppeleit (born 1955), German physician
- Monika Pyrek (born 1980), Polish pole vaulter
- Monika Radulovic (born 1990), Bosnian-born Serbian Australian model and beauty pageant titleholder
- Monika Rajiv Rajale, Indian politician
- Monika Rajnohová (born 1993), Slovak handball player
- Monika Razhgeva (born 1992), Bulgarian footballer
- Mónika Remsei (born 1972), Hungarian rower
- Monika Rhein, German oceanographer
- Monika Richarz (born 1937), German historian
- Monika Rieder (born 1974), Swiss sport shooter
- Monika Rinck (born 1969), German journalist and author
- Monika Ritsch-Marte (born 1961), Austrian physicist
- Monika Rónaszéki-Keresztes (born 1962), Hungarian educator and politician
- Monika Rosa (born 1986), Polish politician
- Monika Rosca (born 1961), Polish former child actress and current pianist
- Monika Rost (born 1943), German guitar and lute player
- Monika Rubin (born 1987), Danish politician
- Monika Ryniak (born 1960), Polish politician
- Monika Sadkowska, Polish climate activist
- Monika Safford (born 1960), American clinician-investigator
- Monika Salzer (born 1948), Austrian psychotherapist and pastor
- Monika Samtani, American broadcast journalist
- Monika Schachl (born 1978), Austrian cyclist
- Monika Scheftschik (born 1953), German luger
- Monika Schleier-Smith, American physicist
- Monika S. Schmid, German linguist
- Monika Schmidt (born 1956), Australian judge
- Monika Schnarre (born 1971), Canadian model and host
- Monika Schneider (born 1983), Polish tennis player
- Monika Schnitzer (born 1961), German economist
- Monika Schwarz-Friesel (born 1961), German cognitive scientist
- Monika Schwingshackl (born 1972), Italian biathlete
- Monika Sikora, German para table tennis player
- Monika Simančíková (born 1995), Slovak former competitive figure skater
- Monika Sjöö, Swedish painter, writer and eco-feminist
- Monika Škáchová, Slovak slalom canoeist
- Monika Skinder (born 2001), Polish cross-country skier
- Monika Smith, Canadian actor
- Monika Smolková (born 1956), Slovak politician
- Monika Soćko (born 1978), Polish chess player
- Countess Monika zu Solms-Laubach (1929–2015), German aristocrat
- Monika Sommer, East German rower
- Monika Sosnowska (born 1972), Polish installation artist
- Monika Sozanska (born 1983), Polish-German épée fencer
- Monika Sprüth, German art dealer and gallerist
- Monika Sta. Maria, Filipino fashion model
- Monika Staab (born 1959), German football player
- Monika Stachowska (born 1981), Polish handball player
- Monika Stadler (born 1963), Austrian harpist and composer
- Monika Starosta (born 1972), Polish tennis player
- Monika Stefanowicz (born 1980), Polish marathon runner
- Monika Steiner, American painter
- Monika Steinmetz (born 1960), German footballer
- Monika Stolz (born 1951), German politician
- Monika Štube (born 1999), Latvian footballer
- Monika Stützle (born 1953), German speed skater
- Monika Tilley (1934–2020), American fashion designer
- Monika Todorovska, Macedonian footballer
- Monika Treut (born 1954), German lesbian filmmaker
- Monika Triest, Belgian academic, writer and activist
- Monika Tsõganova (born 1969), Estonian chess player
- Monika Unger (born 1955), Austrian handball player
- Monika Urban-Szabo, Hungarian rhythmic gymnast
- Monika Vaiciukevičiūtė (born 1996), Lithuanian racewalker
- Monika Vana (born 1969), Austrian politician
- Monika Vasilyan (born 1995), Armenian swimmer
- Monika Veselovski (born 1977), Serbian basketball player
- Monika Wagner (born 1965), German curler
- Monika Waidacher (born 1990), Swiss ice hockey player
- Monika Warnicka (born 1969), Polish hurdler
- Monika Weber-Koszto (born 1966), Romanian and German fencer
- Monika Weiss (born 1964), Polish American contemporary artist
- Monika Wejnert (born 1992), Australian tennis player
- Monika Werner (1938–2024), East German politician
- Monika Wielichowska (born 1973), Polish politician
- Monika Willi, Austrian film editor
- Monika Wołowiec (born 1976), Polish skeleton racer
- Monika Woytowicz, German stage, film, and television actress
- Monika Wulf-Mathies (born 1942), German politician
- Monika Żur (born 1993), Polish cyclist
- Monika Zehrt (born 1952), East German sprinter
- Monika Zernicek (born 1954), German speed skater
- Monika Zguro (born 1971), Miss Albania 1993
- Monika Zgustová (born 1957), Czech writer and translator
- Monika Zingg (born 1943), Swiss figure skater
- Monika Zipplies (born 1956), German rower
- Monika Zuchniak-Pazdan, Polish diplomat

== Fictional characters ==
- Monika, club president and the main antagonist of the dating sim/horror game Doki Doki Literature Club!
- Monika, the Japanese name of the Animal Crossing character Audie
- Monika "IQ" Weiss, a character that features in the video game Tom Clancy's Rainbow Six Siege
