= Beisner =

Beisner is a surname. Notable people with the surname include:

- Barry L. Beisner (born 1951), American Episcopal bishop
- E. Calvin Beisner (born 1955), American Christian theologian and writer
- Michelle Beisner-Buck (born 1976), American television reporter
- Monika Beisner (born 1942), German artist and book illustrator
