= Wolfgang Kubin =

German writer and academic

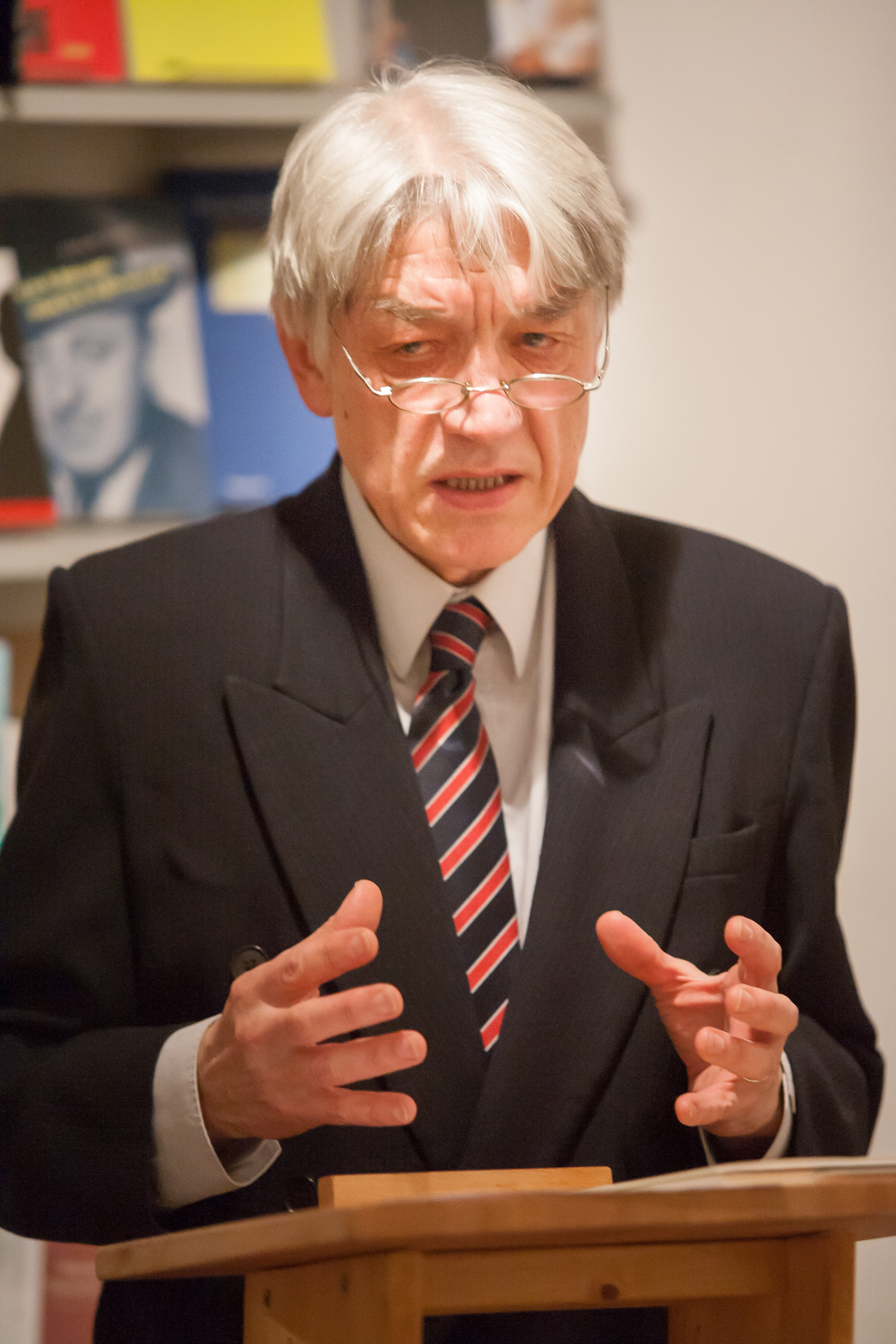
Wolfgang Kubin 2010

Wolfgang Kubin (Chinese: 顾彬; pinyin: Gù Bīn; born December 17, 1945, in Celle) is a German poet, essayist, sinologist and translator of literary works. He is the former director of the Institute for Oriental and Asian Studies at the University of Bonn, Germany. Kubin has frequently been a guest professor at universities in China, for instance at Beijing Foreign Studies University, but also in Madison, Wisconsin, and in Jerusalem. Since 1989, Kubin has been the editor of the journals ORIENTIERUNGEN: Zeitschrift zur Kultur Asiens and Minima sinica: Zeitschrift zum chinesischen Geist.

== Biography ==
Having graduated from the Gymnasium Dionysianum in Rheine in 1965 (which provided him with a solid foundation in Classical Latin and Greek), Wolfgang Kubin studied Protestant theology at the University of Münster from 1966 until 1968. In 1968, he studied Japanology and Classical Chinese at the University of Vienna and from 1969 until 1973, sinology, philosophy, and German literature at the Ruhr University Bochum, Germany. He also engaged again in Japanese studies during these years. His doctoral dissertation focused on the lyrical works of the Tang dynasty poet Du Mu (803–852).

Kubin lectured at the Institute of East Asian Studies of the Free University of Berlin since 1977. He taught 20th century Chinese literature and art, and completed his postdoctoral thesis on the evolution of the concept of nature in Classical Chinese literature.

On October 1, 1985, Kubin became Professor of Chinese (Professor für Chinesisch (C3)) at the Institute for Oriental and Asian Studies at the University of Bonn; in 1989 he became Professor of Modern Sinology and in August 1995 he succeeded Rolf Trauzettel as Professor of Classical Sinology in Bonn.

Wolfgang Kubin became widely known among the general public as a translator of modern Chinese poetry and prose. His best known work is the translation of short stories and essays by Lu Xun. His History of Chinese Literature in the 20th Century (published in German as Geschichte der chinesischen Literatur im 20. Jahrhundert) is considered as indispensable and a Classic.

== 2006 Deutsche Welle interview ==
In November 2006, Wolfgang Kubin made headlines when he commented on fairly recently published Chinese literature during an interview he gave to the German broadcaster Deutsche Welle. He denounced several works in harsh terms, referring to Wei Hui's Shanghai Baby as "garbage" and Jiang Rong's Wolf Totem as "fascist". Kubin has expressed his admiration for Lu Xun, and he has said that no contemporary author could compare to him.

== Selected bibliography ==
=== Monographs and translations ===
- Nachrichten von der Hauptstadt der Sonne: moderne chinesische Lyrik 1919–1984. Frankfurt am Main (Suhrkamp) 1985, ISBN 3-518-11322-4.
- Aus dem Garten der Wildnis: Studien zu Lu Xun (1881–1936). Bonn (Bouvier Verlag) 1989. – ISBN 3-416-04009-0.
- Das neue Lied von der alten Verzweiflung. Bonn (Weidle) 2000, ISBN 3-931135-44-6. – Poems.
- Narrentürme: Gedichte. Bonn (Weidle) 2002, ISBN 3-931135-62-4. – Poems.
- Schattentänzer: Gedichte. Bonn (Weidle) 2004, ISBN 3-931135-83-7. – Poems.
- Halbzeit einer Liebe: eine Erzählung. With an epilogue by Heinz Ludwig Arnold. Vienna (Edition Milo Band 4. Lehner) 2006, ISBN 3-901749-55-1. – Prose fiction.
- Alles vesteht sich auf Verrat: Gedichte. Bonn (Weidle) 2009, ISBN 978-3-938803-16-5. – Poems.
- Unterm Schnurbaum. Bonn (Weidle) 2009, ISBN 978-3-938803-15-8. – Poems.
- Wolfgang Kubin (ed.): Geschichte der chinesischen Literatur (History of Chinese Literature)
  - Vol. 1: Wolfgang Kubin: Die chinesische Dichtkunst. Von den Anfängen bis zum Ende der Kaiserzeit. Munich (Saur) 2002, ISBN 3-598-24541-6.
  - Vol. 2: Thomas Zimmer: Der chinesische Roman der ausgehenden Kaiserzeit. Munich (Saur) 2002, ISBN 3-598-24544-0.
  - Vol. 3: Monika Motsch: Die chinesische Erzählung. Vom Altertum bis zur Neuzeit. Munich (Saur) 2003, ISBN 3-598-24542-4.
  - Vol. 4: Marion Eggert, Wolfgang Kubin, Rolf Trauzettel, Thomas Zimmer: Die klassische chinesische Prosa. Essay, Reisebericht, Skizze, Brief. Vom Mittelalter bis zur Neuzeit. Munich (Saur) 2003, ISBN 3-598-24545-9.
  - Vol. 5: Karl-Heinz Pohl: Ästhetik und Literaturtheorie in China. Von der Tradition bis zur Moderne. Munich (Saur) 2006, ISBN 3-598-24546-7.
  - Vol. 6: Wolfgang Kubin: Das traditionelle chinesische Theater. Vom Mongolendrama bis zur Pekinger Oper. Munich (Saur) 2009, ISBN 978-3-598-24543-5.
  - Vol. 7: Wolfgang Kubin: Die chinesische Literatur im 20. Jahrhundert. Munich (Saur) 2005, ISBN 3-598-24547-5.
  - Band 8: Lutz Bieg: Bibliographie zur chinesischen Literatur in deutscher Sprache. Munich (De Gruyter Saur) 2012, ISBN 3-598-24548-3.
  - Band 9: Marc Hermann, Weiping Huang, Henriette Pleiger, Thomas Zimmer: Biographisches Handbuch chinesischer Schriftsteller. Leben und Werke. Munich (De Gruyter Saur) 2010, ISBN 3-598-24550-5.
  - Band 10: Nicola Dischert: Register. Munich (De Gruyter Saur) 2012, ISBN 3-598-24549-1.
- Bei Dao: Das Buch der Niederlagen – Gedichte. translated and with a postscript by W. Kubin. Munich (Carl Hanser Verlag) 2009, ISBN 978-3-446-23283-9.
- Marc Hermann, Wolfgang Kubin, Thomas Zimmer, Zhang Jie, Lena Henningsen, Shelley W. Chan, Anne Xu-Cobb: Chinesische Gegenwartsliteratur: Zwischen Plagiat und Markt? Munich (edition global) 2009, ISBN 3-922667-12-0.

=== Articles and interviews ===
- Wolfgang Kubin: “To Translate is to Ferry Across: Wu Li's 吳歷 (1632–1718) COLLECTION FROM SAO PAOLO,” in: Michael Lackner and Natascha Vittinghoff (ed.) Mapping Meanings: The Field of New Learning in Late Qing China. Leiden (Brill) 2004, pp. 579 ff. – ISBN 90-04-13919-2.
- Wolfgang Kubin, “Living with the Holocaust” in: At Home in Many Worlds: Reading, Writing and Translating from Chinese and Jewish Cultures. Essays in Honour of Irene Eber. (Veröffentlichungen des Ostasien-Instituts der Ruhr-Universität Bochum, 56), edited by Raoul David Findeisen, Gad C. Isay, Amira Katz-Goehr, Yuri Pines and Lihi Yariv-Laor. Wiesbaden (Harrassowitz Verlag) 2009, pp. 19–27. – ISBN 978-3-447-06135-3.
- Wolfgang Kubin, “The Myriad Things: Random Thoughts on Nature in China and the West,” in: Hans Ulrich Vogel and Günter Dux (eds.), Concepts of Nature: A Chinese-European Cross-Cultural Perspective. With an overview and introduction by Mark Elvin. Leiden (Brill) 2010, pp. 516–525. – ISBN 978-90-04-18526-5.
- Der Übersetzer „in Klammern“ Deutsch-Chinesisches Kulturnetz, September 2009.
- Reflecting on Chinese literature. CCTV-9, 7. November 2010.
- Píng Xīn 平心 (Interview): 德国汉学权威另一只眼看现当代中国文学 Déguó Hànxué Quánwēi Lìngyīzhī Yǎn Kàn Xiàn-Dāngdài Zhōngguó Wénxué Deutsche Welle, 26. November 2006.

== Honors ==
Kubin received the Friendship Award (China) in 2016. He also received the Pamir International Poetry Prize (帕米尔国际诗歌奖 Pàmǐěr Guójì Shīgē Jiǎng) which is taken to be the top literary prize awarded in the Chinese-speaking world. In 2013, the Deutsche Akademie für Sprache und Dichtung (German Academy for Language and Literature) awarded him the Johann Heinrich Voß Prize in Translation in recognition of his achievement as a literary translator.
