= Jānis Limans =

Latgalian ceramicist

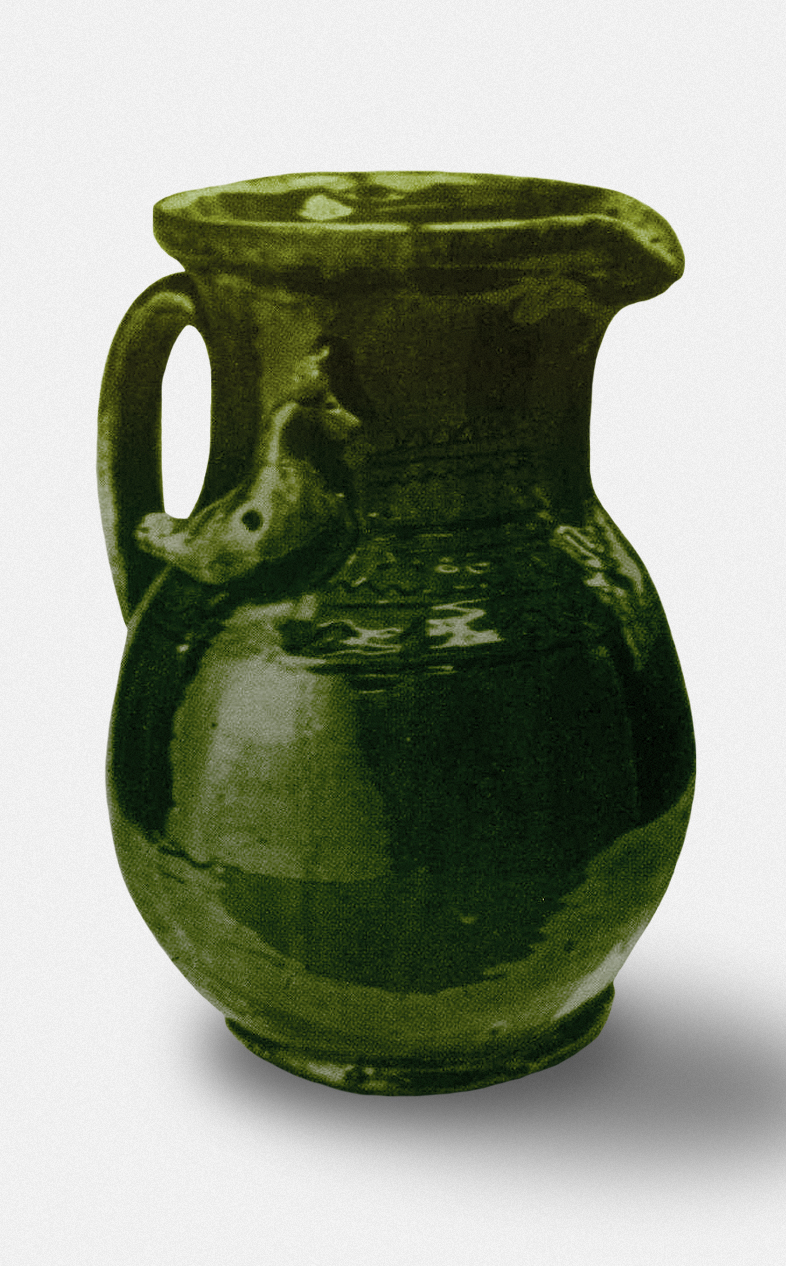
- Ceramic jug by Limans
- Born: Jānis Limans; October 1925; Limani, Latvia
- Died: 10 July 1992 (aged 66); Limani, Latvia
- Known for: Ceramics
- Movement: Latgalian ceramics
- Spouse: Tekla Limane

Jānis Limans (October 1925 – 10 July 1992) was a Latvian and Latgalian ceramicist.

== Biography ==
Jānis Limans was born in Limani village in Rušona Parish, Latvia in 1925. His home village was one of the Silajāņi villages, known for its ceramicists, such as Monika Limane. He started to work as a ceramicist from 1948.

Limans, alongside Andrejs Paulāns, Polikarps Čerņavskis, Augusts Zagorskis and others, was one of the Latgalian ceramicists that was represented in Silajāņi ceramics exhibitions in Rīga, Daugavpils and other Latvian SSR towns in the 1950s. In later years, his works were selected for the exhibitions in Latvian SSR and abroad, in Poland.

Jānis Limans died in 1992, in Limani. He is buried in the Eisāgi cemetery.
