= Moonika =

Female given name

- Gender: Female
- Language: Estonian
- Name day: 13 June

Origin
- Region of origin: Estonia

Other names
- Related names: Monica, Monika, Monique

Moonika is an Estonian feminine given name; a cognate of the names Monica and Monique. Another cognate, Monika, is also found in Estonia.

As of 1 January 2020, 756 women in Estonia have the first name Moonika, making it the 224th most popular female name in the country. The name is most commonly found in Hiiu County. Individuals bearing the name Moonika include:

- Moonika Aava (born 1979), Estonian javelin thrower
- Moonika Parksepp (born 1983), Estonian municipal official
- Moonika Siimets (born 1980), Estonian film director
- Moonika Teemus (born 1979), Estonian art historian
- Moonika Tõrva (born 1977), Estonian rower
- Helle-Moonika Helme (born 1966), Estonian musician and politician
