= Żywiołak =

Polish music band

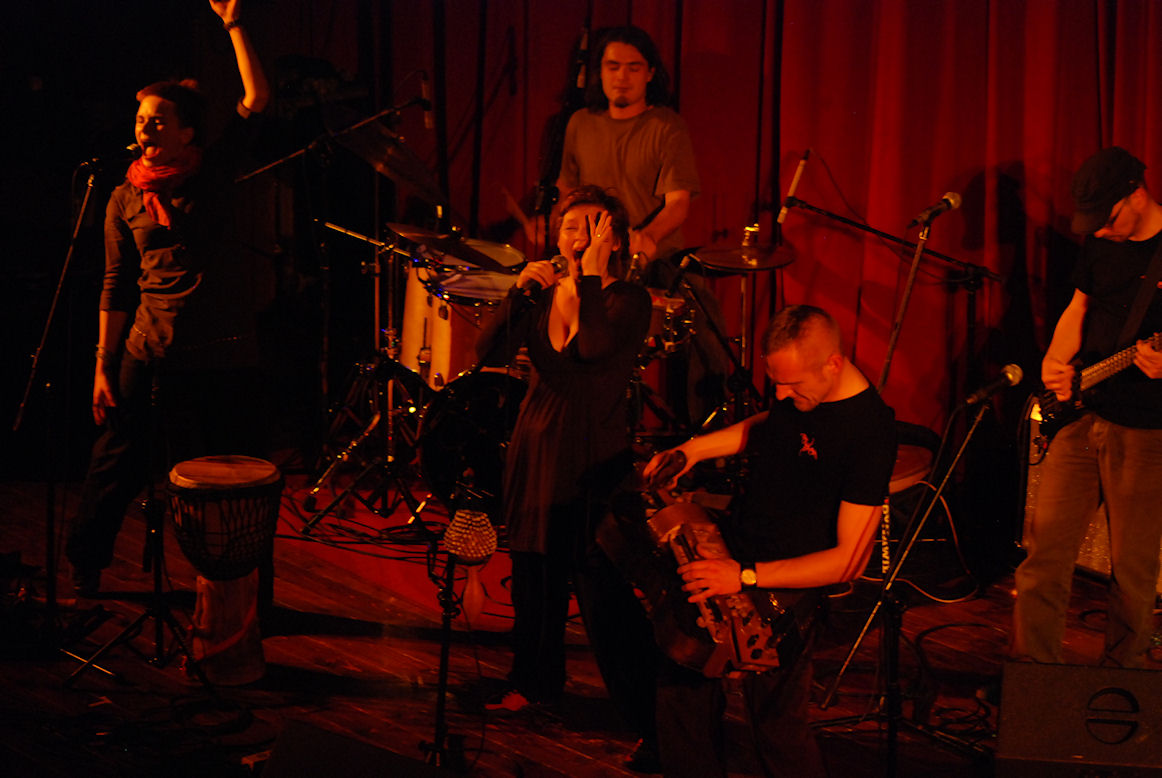
- Żywiołak at a festival in Katowice, 2009

Background information
- Origin: Warsaw, Poland
- Genres: Slavic folk music, folk rock
- Years active: 2005–present
- Members: Robert Jaworski; Isabella Beer; Robert Vasylevsky; Anna Piotrovska; Maciej Dimek; Monika Sadkovska; Agnieszka Binek
- Past members: Monika Sadkowska
- Website: www.zywiolak.pl

Żywiołak is a Polish folk and rock band from Warsaw.

== Music ==
The band incorporates folk, punk, rock, and techno musical styles, as well as the sounds of restored ancient instruments, recently invented instruments, and various archaic and modern vocal techniques.

The lyrical content of their music encompasses pre-Christian Slavic beliefs including Slavic demonology, legends, and fairy tales.

== History ==
The band was formed in January 2005, initially as a duo of multi-instrumentalists Robert Jaworski and Robert Wasilewski. They were soon joined by percussion specialist Maciej Dymek and singers Anucha Piotrowska and Izabella Byra. In June 2007, percussionist Maciej Dymek joined the group and, in August 2008, Monika Sadkowska replaced Izabella Byra on vocals.

In 2008, Żywiołak was nominated for the Polish final of the 2008 Eurovision Song Contest but was ultimately disqualified for breaking contest rules.

== Members ==
- Robert Jaworski – hurdy gurdy, renaissance violin, lute, flute, bagpipe, viola
- Isabella Beer – vocals
- Robert Vasylevsky – bass guitar, lute, electric guitar, vocals
- Anna Piotrovska – vocals
- Maciej Dimek – drum, cymbals, percussion
- Monika Sadkovska – vocals
- Agnieszka Binek – violin, vocals

== Discography ==
- Muzyka psychodelicznej świtezianki (EP, 2007)
- Nowa Ex-Tradycja (2008)
- Nowa Mix-Tradycja (2010)
- Globalna wiocha (2011)
- Muzyka psychoaktywnego stolema (2016)
- Pieśni pół/nocy (2017)
- Wendzki Sznyt (2019)
