= Monika Limane =

Latgalian ceramicist

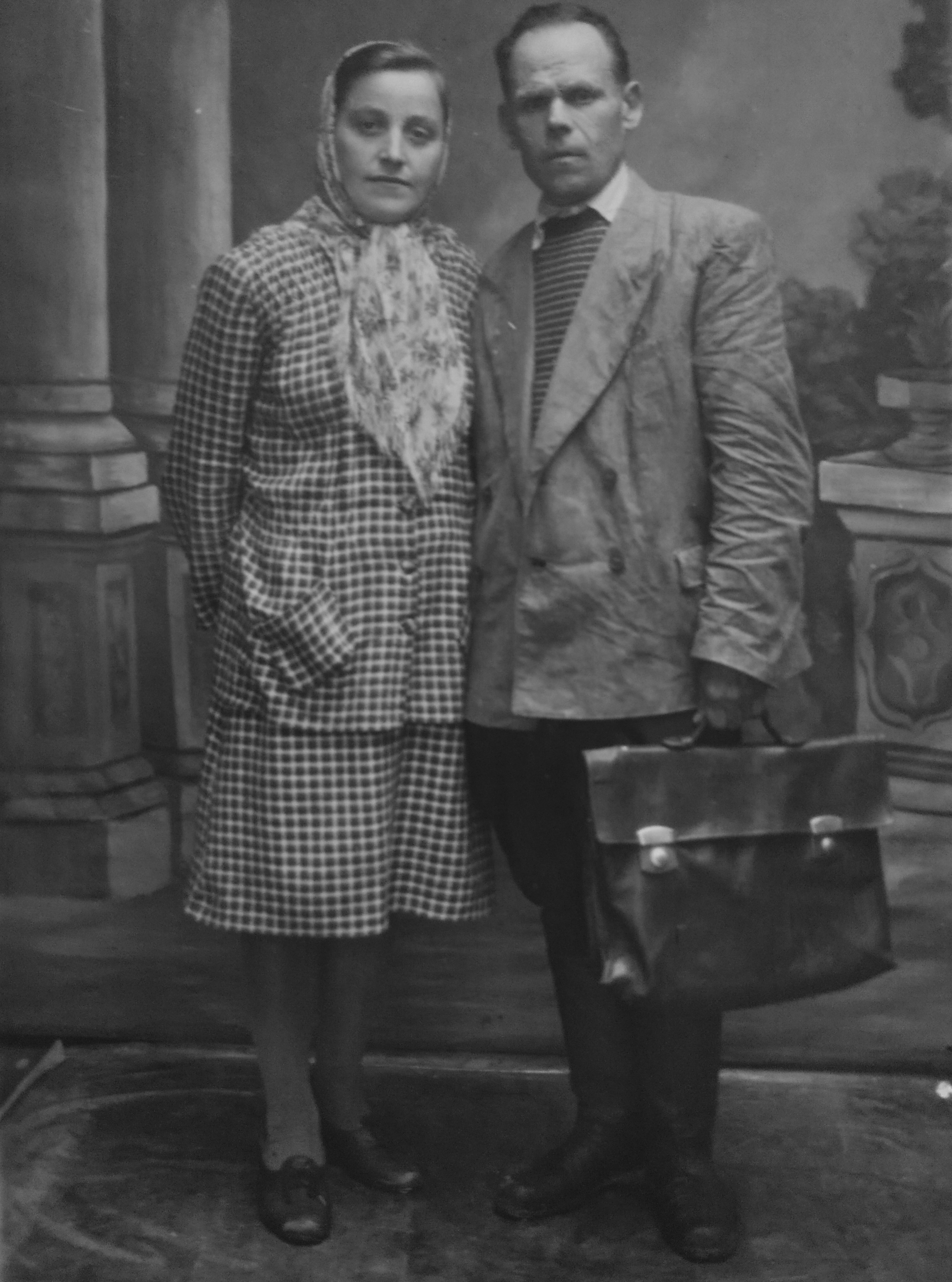
- Monika Limane with her husband, Alfons.
- Born: 8 June 1924; Aizkalne Parish, Latvia
- Died: 10 August 2010 (aged 86); Preiļi, Latvia
- Known for: Ceramics
- Movement: Latgalian ceramics
- Spouse: Alfons Limans

Monika Limane (8 June 1924 – 10 August 2010) was a Latvian and Latgalian ceramicist. She was the first professional Latgalian female ceramicist.

== Biography ==
Monika Limane was born at Babri village in Aizkalne Parish, Latvia in 1924, in the family of a tailor and housewife. She became a ceramicist after the marriage with her husband, Alfons Limans. He was from the Limani village, known for its ceramicists, such as Jānis Limans.

Limane, alongside Andrejs Paulāns, Polikarps Čerņavskis and others, was one of the Latgalian ceramicists that was represented in Silajāņi ceramics exhibitions in Rīga, Daugavpils and other Latvian SSR towns in the 1950s. Some of her works were part of the art exhibitions in Moscow and Warsaw.

Her works are in the collections of Latvian National Museum of Art and Latvian Museum of National History in Riga.

== Personal life and death ==
Limane was born in a family of World War I veteran Jāzeps Babris, who was a tailor, and her mother was a housewife. She was the eldest child of six children. From 1949 to 1982, she was married to Alfons Limans. They had two children.

After she retired from ceramicist work, Limane worked as a tailor, sewing winter coats. She died in 2010, at the age of 86, and she was buried in the Eisāgi cemetery alongside her husband and youngest son.
