= Monika Meyer =

Monika Meyer is the name of:

- Monika Hamann (née Meyer; born 1954), German sprinter
- Monika Meyer (footballer) (born 1972), German footballer
