= Aizkalne Parish =

- parish of Latvia
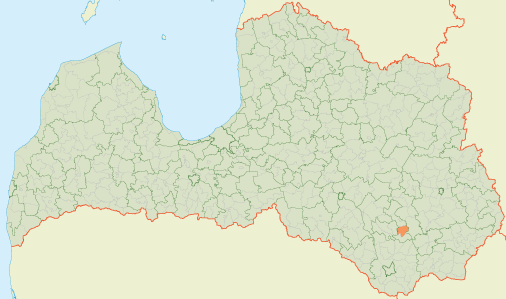
- Coordinates: 56°12′19″N 26°45′13″E
- Country: Latvia

Population (1 January 2026)
  - Total: 399

Aizkalne Parish (Latvian: Aizkalnes pagasts) is an administrative unit of Preiļi Municipality in the Latgale region of Latvia. The administrative center is Aizkalne.

The parish was formed around the former Jāsmuiža Manor (Josmuiža, Jasmuiža, Polish: Jasz-Muyża) in the late 19th century as a part of Daugavpils county. After 1949, when parishes were abolished by the Soviet occupation, it was a part of Preiļi district. In 2000 the town of Preiļi, Preiļi Parish and Aizkalne Parish were merged into Preiļi Municipality, then – a second-level administrative unit within Preiļi district. When districts were abolished by the 2009 Latvian administrative reform, the parish was reinstated as a part of Preiļi Municipality.

The father of notable Latvian poet and politician Rainis, Krišjānis Pliekšāns, owned Jāsmuiža Manor from 1883 to 1889. During this time, Rainis was a frequent visitor there. The Jasmuiža Rainis Museum was opened in the manor in 1965, showcasing an exhibition about the early life of the poet and a late-19th-century style Latgalian ceramics workshop that was built by Andrejs Paulāns.

== Images ==
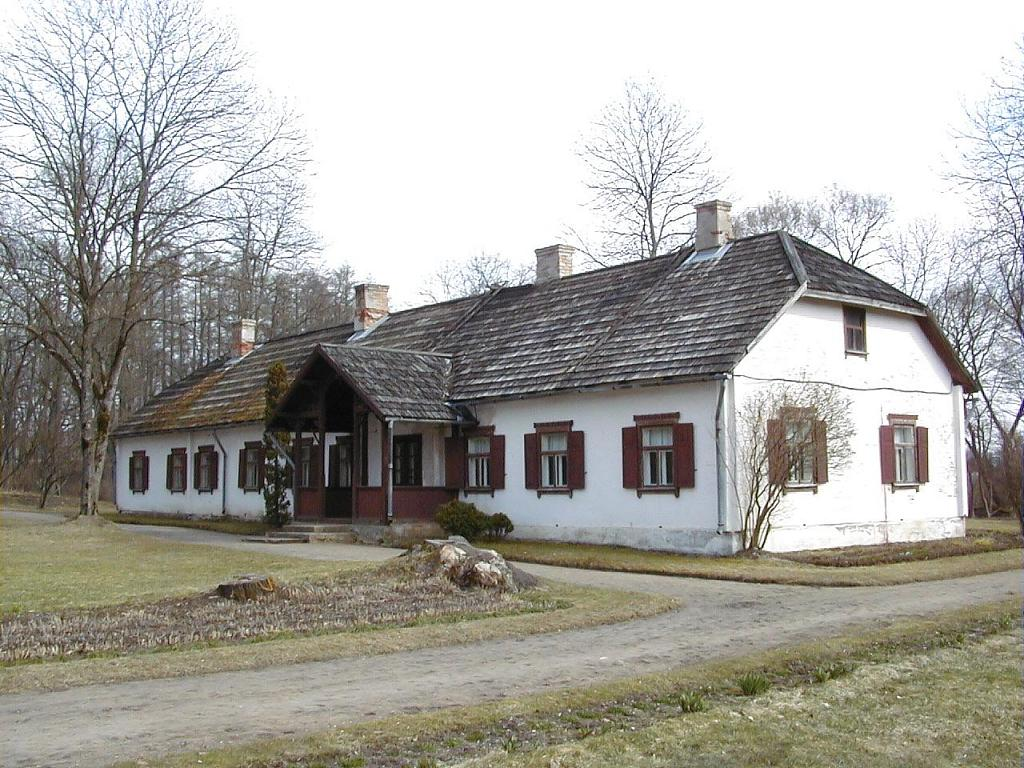
Jasmuiža Rainis Museum in 2001

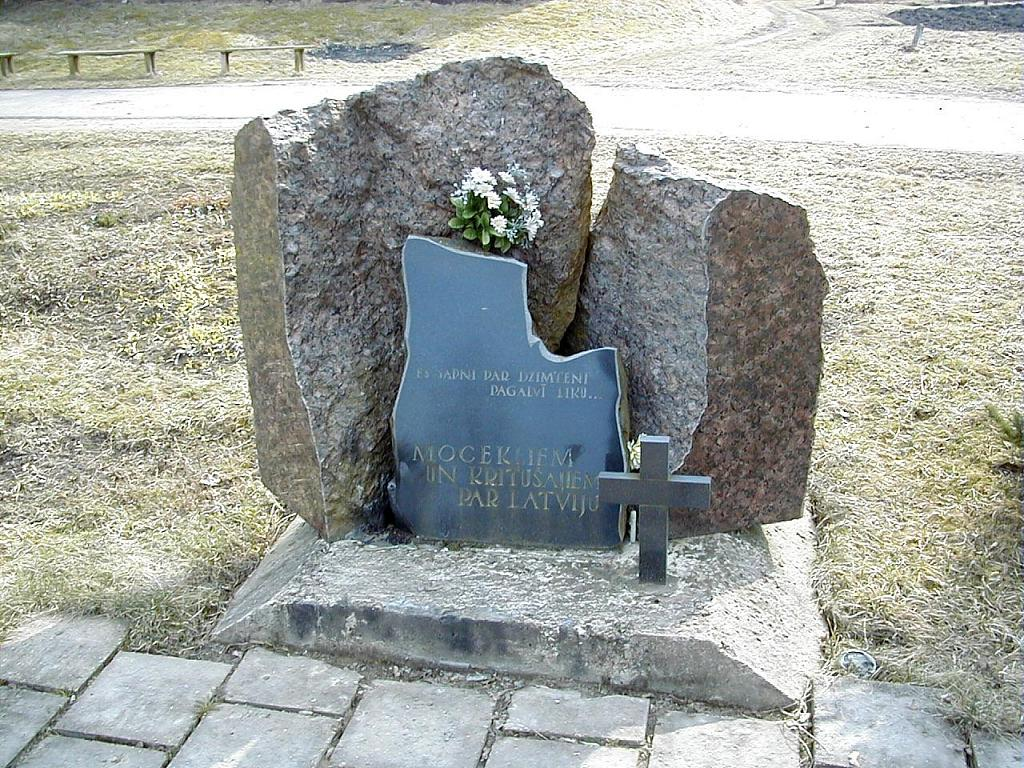
Monument to the people of Aizkalne who perished in both world wars, the Latvian War of Independence and the occupation of Latvia

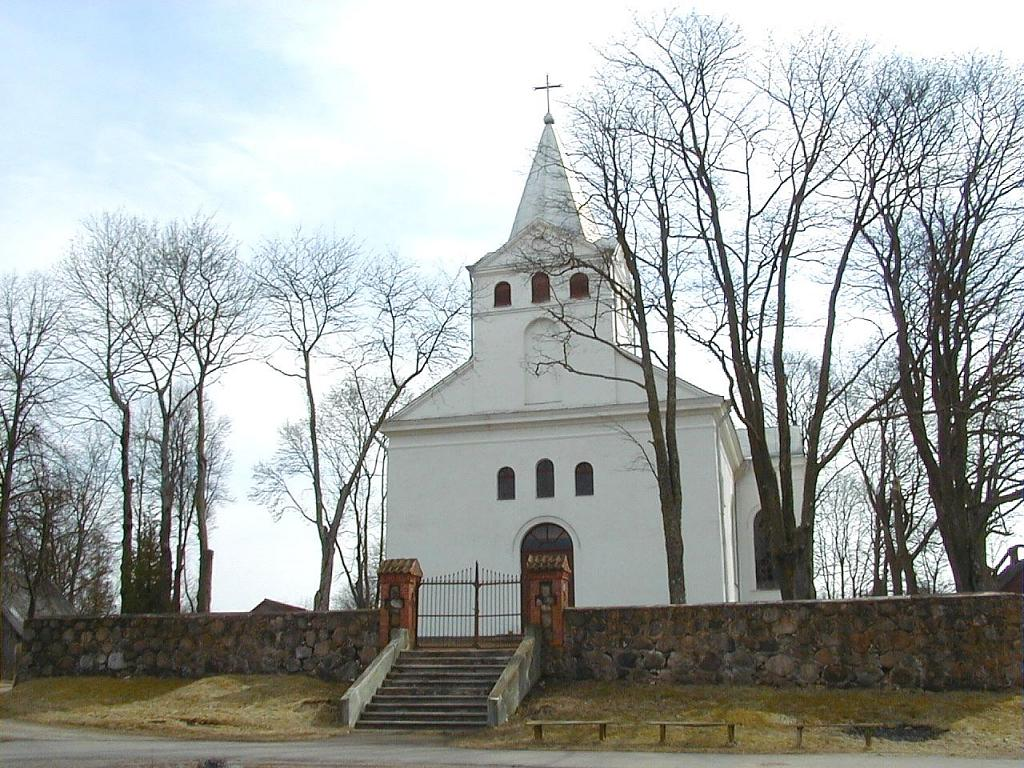
Jasmuiža Veneration of the Saint Cross Roman Catholic Church, Aizkalne
