= Monika Motyčáková =

Slovak chess player

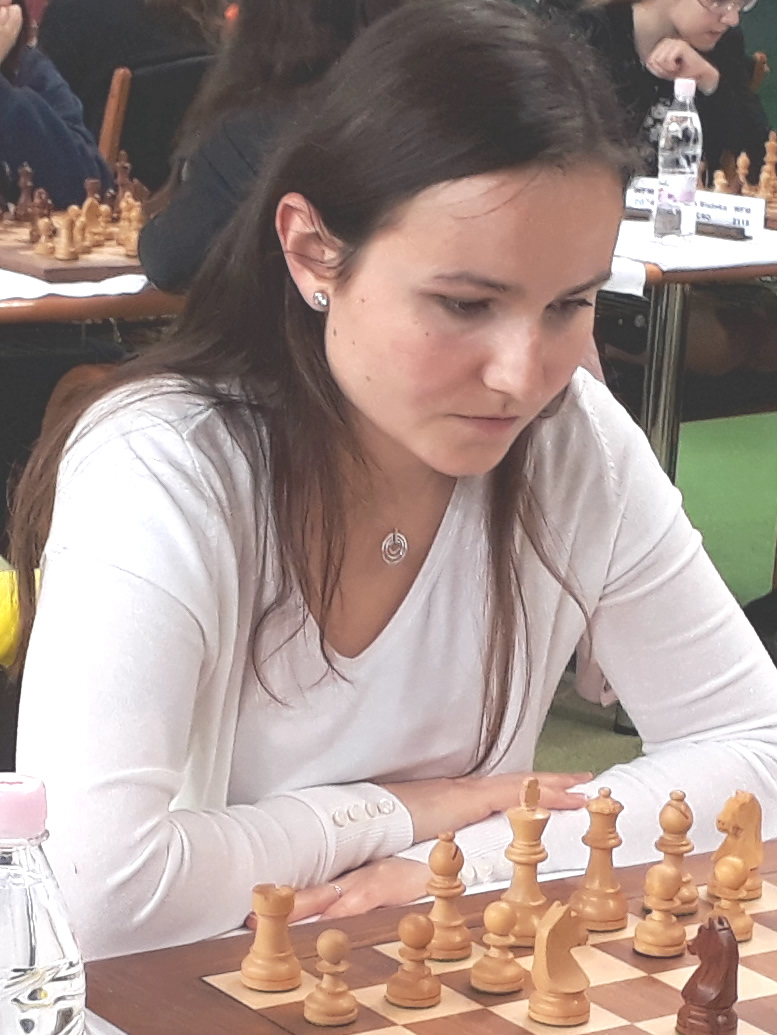

Personal information
- Born: 2 June 1992 (age 34) Ružomberok, Czechoslovakia

Chess career
- Country: Slovakia
- Title: Woman FIDE Master (2010)
- Peak rating: 2207 (April 2018)

Monika Motyčákova (born 2 July 1992) is a Slovak chess player, FIDE master (2010), and 2015 chess champion of Slovakia.

Motyčákova was born in Ružomberok. She studied Management at the University of Žilina, graduating in 2015.
