= Monika Bolliger =

Swiss journalist and author

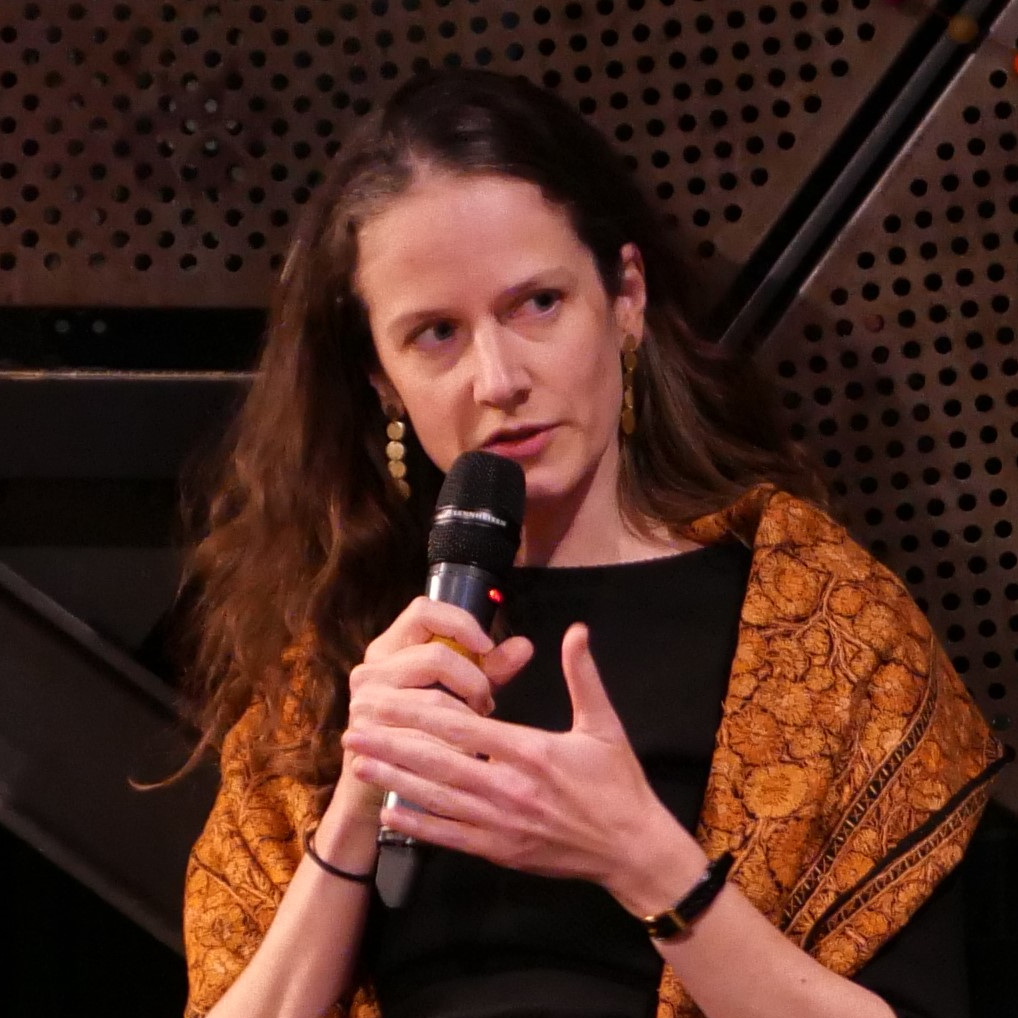
- Bolliger in 2023 during a book presentation in Zürich.

Monika Bolliger (born 28 March 1983) is a Swiss journalist and author with a focus on Middle Eastern affairs.

== Early life and education ==
Bolliger was born in Affoltern am Albis, a town and a municipality in the district of Affoltern in the canton of Zürich in Switzerland. She attended high school in Urdorf, a municipality close to Zürich. As she stated in a later interview, it was a history teacher there who kindled her enthusiasm for questions about the causes of conflicts and the functioning or failure of social systems.

After graduating from high school, she began studying general history at the University of Zurich. A seminar that, in a change of perspective, dealt with the Arab view of the Crusades, prompted Bolliger to choose Arabic as a minor subject in addition to international law. To expand her language skills beyond Standard Arabic and to learn the Levantine dialect, she went to Damascus University in 2006 for one year. Bolliger has stated that ever since then she has felt a particularly close emotional bond with the Syrian capital. After returning to the University of Zurich, she completed her studies in 2010 with a master’s thesis, supervised by Professor Hans-Lukas Kieser, about the issue of "Syrian nation, Arab nation – A conceptual analysis of the problem of forming a national identity in Syria: A comparison of textbooks about history under Hafiz al-Asad and Basar al-Asad".

== Career ==
After a four-month traineeship at the daily Neue Zürcher Zeitung (NZZ), a German-language newspaper of record particularly for reporting on international affairs, and an internship at the Swiss Federal Department of Foreign Affairs (EDA), Bolliger started working at the NZZ in 2011 as an editorial assistant with a focus on the Middle East. The following year she became the NZZ's Middle East correspondent, at first based in Jerusalem until 2014, then in Cairo in 2015, and from 2016 on in Beirut. She described Arnold Hottinger (1926–2019), who was widely considered a legendary luminary in the journalism of Switzerland and beyond, as her great role model. In the summer of 2018, Bolliger resigned from her job at the NZZ because, according to her own statements, she needed to distance herself from the news in the region, but a sabbatical from the NZZ was not possible. In a farewell text, Peter Rásonyi – the NZZ director of the department for international reporting – praised her work:

« Thanks to her commitment, her excellent language skills and her expertise, she came particularly close to the people who are far too often plagued by war, authoritarianism and poverty. She was able to convey an independent, authentic and multi-layered picture of the region with its many facets and contradictions ».

In the following three years, she worked as a freelance journalist, particularly for the Swiss online magazine Republik, as a project manager in the field of peacebuilding and as an analyst for the Yemeni think-tank Sana'a Center for Strategic Studies. She also worked with the Yemeni writer, journalist and activist Bushra al-Maktari to publish her collection of eyewitness testimonies from the Yemen war in German language. Sandra Hetzl translated the book, which was initially published in Arabic, into German. It was published in 2020 by Constantin Schreiber, a prominent journalist with the ARD group of German public broadcasters, under the title "Was hast Du hinter Dir gelassen?: Stimmen aus dem vergessenen Krieg im Jemen" ("What did you leave behind? Voices from the forgotten war in Yemen"). In the same year, al-Maktari received the Johann Philipp Palm Prize for freedom of expression and freedom of the press.

In March 2021, Bolliger started working as an editor for the Middle East in the international department of the German magazine Der Spiegel and its news website Spiegel Online. In late 2021, she published a monograph on the Lebanese port city of Tripoli. In May 2024, after three years at Der Spiegel, Bollinger started working as a radio producer at Echo der Zeit. The news and background programme, which is aired daily and one of the oldest programmes in the German-speaking world, is widely considered as the flagship of the Schweizer Radio und Fernsehen (SRF; "Swiss Radio and Television") public broadcasting company.

In 2026, she took on the newly created leadership role of the Global Department at the online magazine Republik.

== Selected publications ==
- Writing Syrian History While Propagating Arab Nationalism – Textbooks about Modern Arab History under Hafiz and Bashar al-Asad. in: Journal of Educational Media, Memory, and Society, Volume 3 (2011) No. 2.
- Tripolis – Der Nahe Osten im Spiegelbild einer Stadt. Rotpunktverlag, Zürich 2021, ISBN 978-3-85869-927-5
