= Monika Wołowiec =

Polish skeleton racer (born 1976)

Monika Wołowiec (born February 14, 1976) is a Polish skeleton racer who has competed since 2004. She finished 15th and last in the women's skeleton event at the 2006 Winter Olympics in Turin.

Wolowiec's best finish at the FIBT World Championships was 21st in the women's skeleton event at Calgary in 2005. She lives in Park City, Utah.
