= Monika Fornaçon =

German football referee

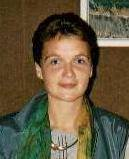
Monika Fornaçon

Monika Fornaçon (born February 2, 1964, as Monika Oelfke), is a German football referee.

== Career ==
=== Career as a player ===
From 1978 to 1991 Fornaçon played football in Steimbke and Haßbergen.

=== Career as a referee ===
Since 1981 she is an acting referee. From 1991 to 2004 she was registered in the list of the German Football Association, from 1998 to 2003 in the list of FIFA. In the year 2000 she umpired the women's DFB-Cup's finale in Berlin. Furthermore, she acted there as linesman in 1995, 1998, 2001 and 2007. She acted internationally in several matches as well as in the UEFA Women's Championship 2001 in Germany. Fornaçon was also admitted as referee for men's Oberliga from 1998 to 2003. In 2007 Fornaçon quit being referee. From now on she operates i.a. as an observer for other referees and is on the committee of referees in the Niedersächsischer Fußballverband (=Association of Football in Lower-Saxony).

== Life ==
Fornaçon is married and has two children. She lives in Stöckse with her family and works as an administrator at Landkreis Nienburg/Weser.
