= Monika Ivantysynova =

German-American engineer

Monika Ivantysynova (1955–2018) was an East German-born engineer specializing in fluid power, known for her design of piston pumps and valveless hydraulic actuators and more generally for her leadership in the field of fluid power research. She was Maha Named Professor in Fluid Power Systems for Mechanical Engineering and Agricultural and Biological Engineering at Purdue University.

== Life ==
Ivantysynova was born in Polenz, a district of the town of Brandis in what was then East Germany, on 11 December 1955. She earned a master's degree and doctorate at the Slovak University of Technology in Bratislava in Czechoslovakia, finishing her doctorate in 1983, and began working in industry. Around the time of German reunification in 1990, she returned to academia, as a researcher on aircraft flight control actuation, at the Hamburg University of Technology. She became a professor of fluid power and control at the University of Duisburg in 1996, and moved back to the Hamburg University of Technology as professor of mechatronic systems in 1999.

In 2004, she became Maha Named Professor in Fluid Power Systems for Mechanical Engineering and Agricultural and Biological Engineering at Purdue University, a position she retained for the rest of her career. She was the founding director of the Maha Fluid Power Research Center, and a leader in the Engineering Research Center for Compact and Efficient Fluid Power. She was also one of the founders of Fluid Power Net International, an international research organization on fluid power, which in 2016 merged with the Network of Fluid Power Centres of Europe to form the Global Fluid Power Society. She was founding editor-in-chief of the International Journal of Fluid Power.

She died of cancer on 11 August 2018.

== Recognition ==
Ivantysynova was the 2009 winner of the Joseph Bramah Medal of the Institution of Mechanical Engineers, "for outstanding commitment to international fluid power research and education, particularly in the field of hydrostatic pumps and motors". She was awarded honorary doctorates by the Slovak University of Technology in Bratislava, and by LUT University in Finland. SAE International named her to their 2014 class of SAE Fellows. She was the 2015 winner of the Robert E. Koski Medal of the American Society of Mechanical Engineers, and was also named as an ASME Fellow in 2015.
