= Monika Safford =

American clinician-investigator

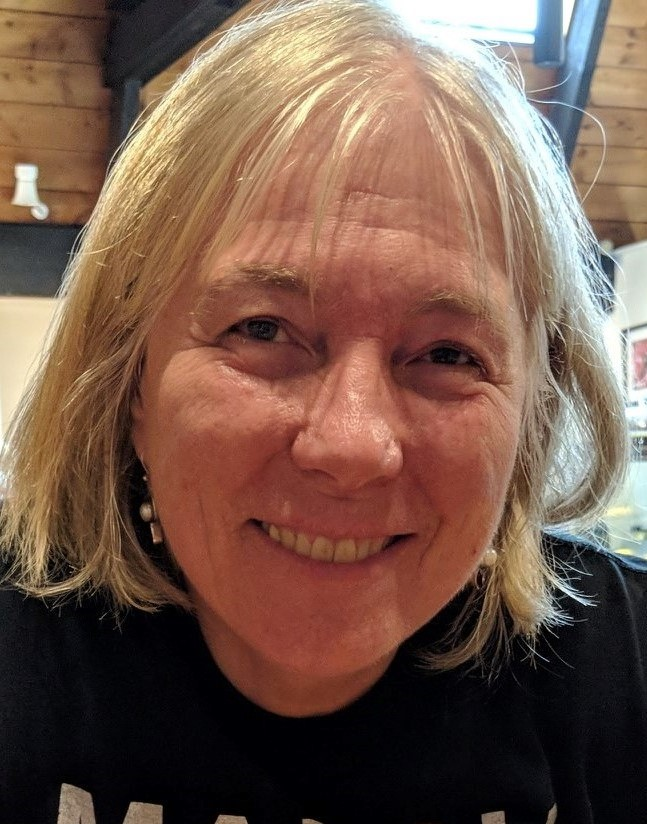
- Born: July 5, 1960 (age 66); Vienna, Austria

Academic background
- Education: BA, Biology and German, 1982, Dartmouth College; MD, 1986, Weill Cornell Medicine

Academic work
- Institutions: Weill Cornell Graduate School of Medical Sciences; University of Alabama at Birmingham School of Medicine; Brown University Alpert Medical School

Monika M. Safford is an American clinician-investigator. She is the former Chief of the Division of General Internal Medicine at NewYork-Presbyterian Hospital and John J. Kuiper Professor of Medicine at Weill Cornell Graduate School of Medical Sciences. She was the inaugural Endowed Professor of Diabetes Prevention and Outcomes Research and Assistant Dean for Continuing Medical Education at the University of Alabama at Birmingham School of Medicine.

== Early life and education ==
Safford was born in Vienna, Austria as an American naturalized citizen. She moved to New York's Hudson Valley in 1967. She earned her Bachelor of Arts degree in biology and German from Dartmouth College before enrolling at Weill Cornell Medicine for her medical degree.

== Career ==
Upon completing her MD, Safford accepted an instructor position at Brown University Alpert Medical School with a hospital appointment at the Miriam Hospital. She then went into private practice in the greater Hartford, Connecticut area before becoming the director of an inner-city clinic in Newark, New Jersey where her clientele was mostly African-Americans. She accepted a faculty position at the University of Alabama at Birmingham School of Medicine in 2003, where she was the inaugural Endowed Professor of Diabetes Prevention and Outcomes Research and Assistant Dean for Continuing Medical Education.

While serving in this role, Safford studied non-invasive treatments for diabetes including diet and exercise. In 2012, she co-led a study showing that intensive lifestyle interventions could possibly put those with type 2 diabetes into remission and eliminate the need for medication. Later, she was named a co-recipient of the Max Cooper Award for Research Excellence for her research "on the elimination of health disparities in cardiometabolic disorders through observational research in the Reasons for Geographic and Racial Differences in Stroke (REGARDS) study and other large databases." In 2014, Safford and her research team engaged in a long-term study to assist those with diabetes commit to medication adherence. She was subsequently awarded the Alere Wellbeing Research to Practice Award by the Society of Behavioral Medicine.

Prior to leaving UAB, Safford led a team to conduct a trial aiming to improve blood pressure in rural Southeastern African Americans with low socioeconomic status. She also participated in the National Diabetes Education Program's (NDEP) Medication Adherence Task Group to review and compile resources for the NDEP's Promoting Medication Adherence in Diabetes Web resource.

In 2015, Safford was appointed Chief of the Division of General Internal Medicine at NewYork-Presbyterian Hospital and John J. Kuiper Professor of Medicine at Weill Cornell Graduate School of Medical Sciences. One of her primary responsibilities in the role of Chief is to expand the division's clinical research program by recruiting top investigators. As the John J. Kuiper Professor of Medicine, Safford completed a merge between the hospital medicine and ambulatory care within the division and established the PALS (Patient Activated Learning System), an online source of knowledge for patients. In her role as Chief, Safford collaborated with researchers at the David Geffen School of Medicine to investigate the usability of OurNotes, a platform that lets patients co-produce medical notes with clinicians.

== Publications ==
Safford is a highly published researcher, with over 650 publications on PubMed and 816 publications on ResearchGate. Her areas of research center around health equity, with focuses on diabetes, hypertension, stroke, and prevention.
