= Monika Bittl =

German writer and journalist (1963–2022)

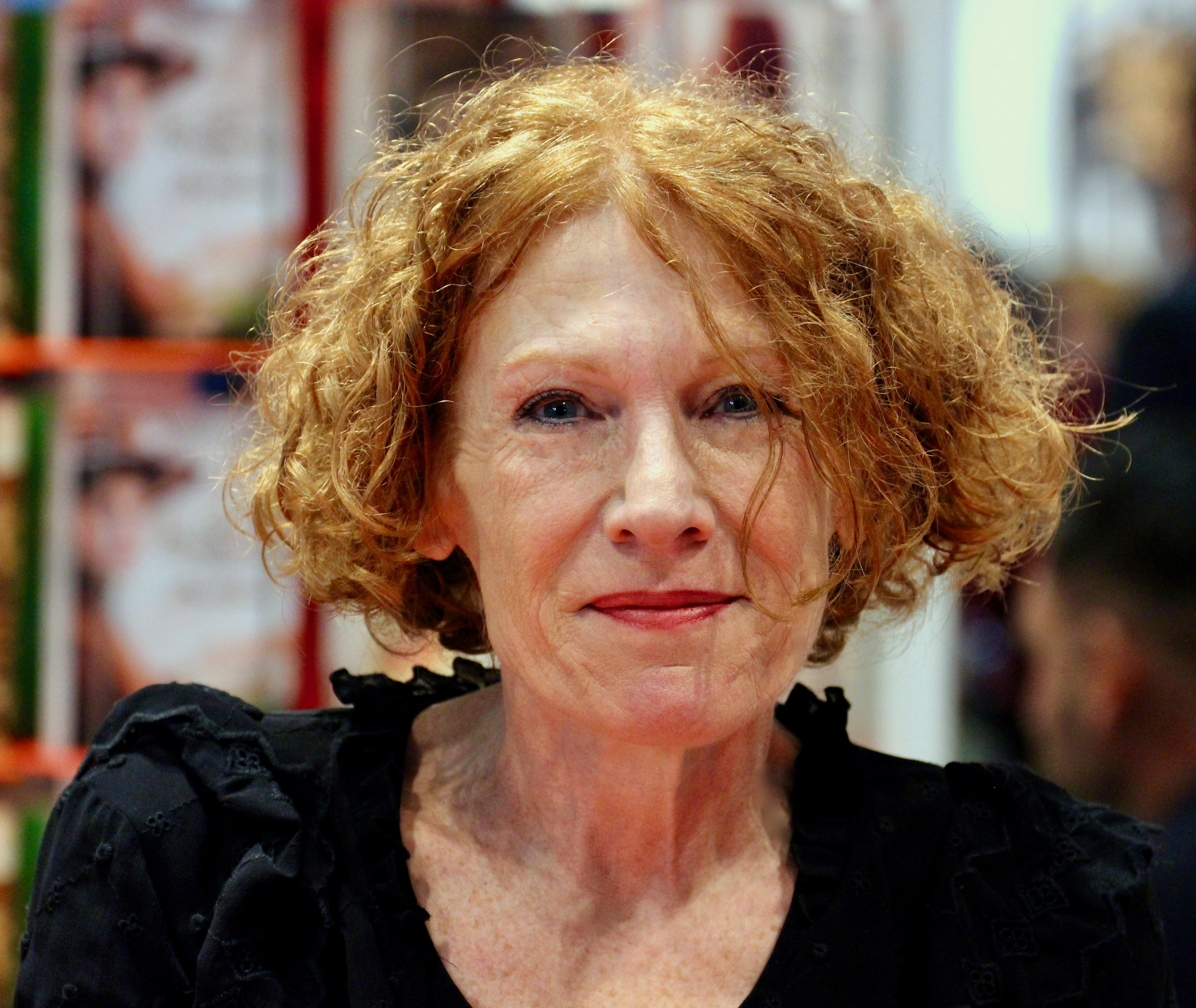
- Monika in 2018
- Born: 9 January 1963; Germany
- Died: 28 October 2022 (aged 59); Beilngries, Germany
- Occupations: Writer, journalist, screenwriter, lecturer

Monika Bittl (9 January 1963 – 28 October 2022) was a German writer, journalist, screenwriter and lecturer of creative writing.

== Life ==
Monika Bittl completed a daily newspaper traineeship from 1982 to 1984, lived in Sicily for two years and studied German and psychology at LMU Munich from 1986 to 1992, graduating with a Magister Artium. In 1993/94, she received a scholarship from the Munich Film Academy (HFF) (screenplay workshop); From 1993, she lived as a freelance author in Munich. In 2011, she was named Munich Tower Writer. In 2014, she was the first woman to be elected "Author of Freedom" by the Friedrich Naumann Foundation. As an "enormously versatile author" (Süddeutsche Zeitung), Bittl worked very successfully in various fields: She wrote screenplays, narrative non-fiction, novels, essays, journalistic articles and taught creative writing at the HFF Munich and at the "Jugend Film Fernsehen" institute.

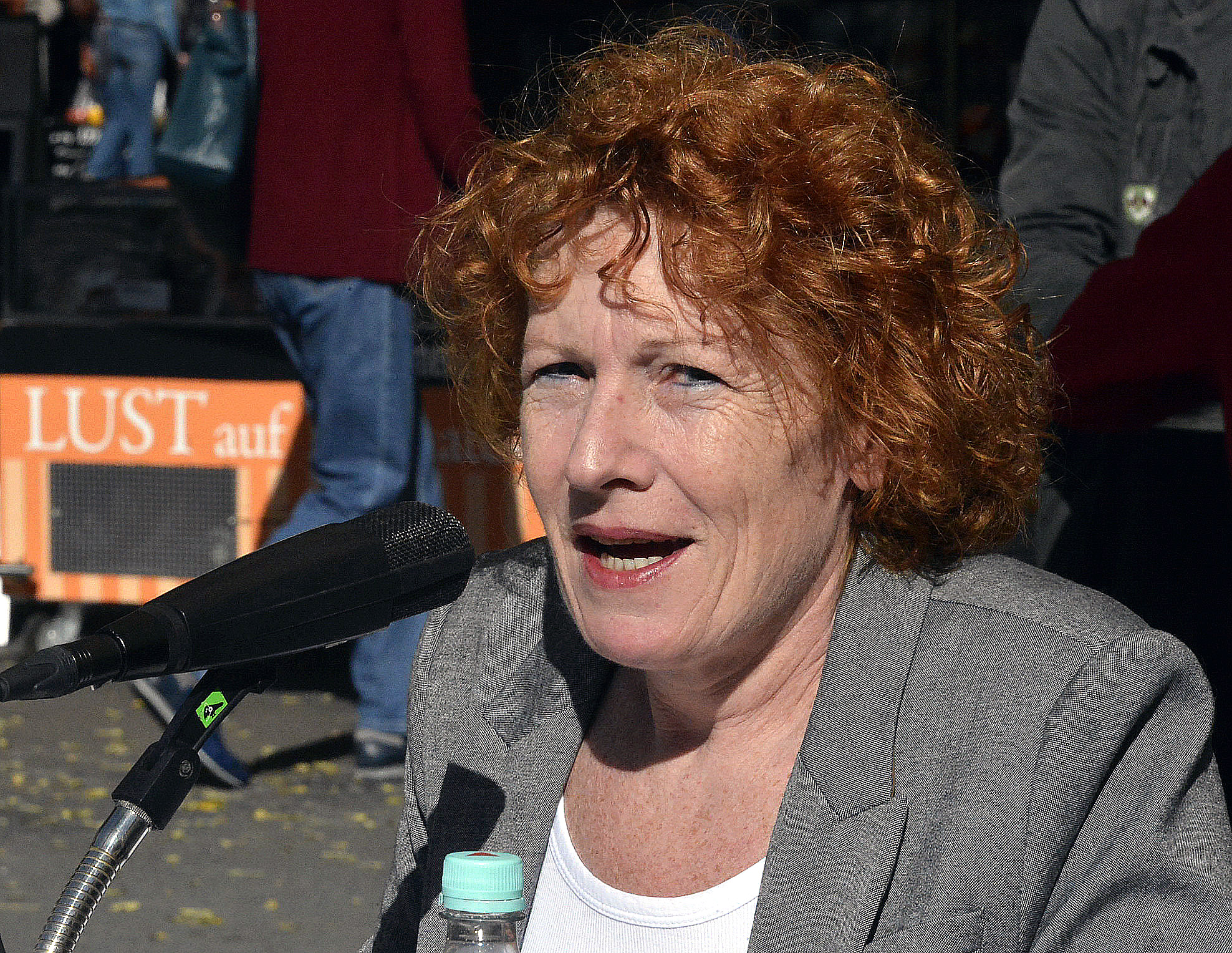
Monika in 2012

As a screenwriter, she specialized in Bavarian material and topics. In her first five novels, she often described historical women. In the narrative non-fiction, she created tragicomic inventories of the reality of women's lives today. She also worked as a journalist, among others for the Süddeutsche Zeitung and the Focus. Until 2016 she wrote essays among others for NovoArgumente.

In September 2018, Bittl released You have to be able to let go sometimes, a British black comedy that was highly praised and described by the Buchjournal as "fast-paced, clever and hilarious".

I remembered myself as younger - reading botox for women over 40 was number one on the Spiegel bestseller list paperback for 27 weeks in 2016. It was on the Spiegel bestseller list for a total of two years and thus became a German mega-bestseller. It has been translated into Chinese, Russian and Dutch, among other languages. I want to stay as I was - happiness push-up for women over 40 entered the Spiegel Paperback bestseller list in 2017 three days after its release and also became a bestseller. The follow-up titles Without my husband I would be happily married - reading wellness for women with attachments and Women never lie and don't live to 39 at the most - down-aging for beginners also entered the Spiegel non-fiction bestseller list shortly after their publication in August 2018 and December 2019. Bittl's novels You have to be able to let go sometimes and You should clean out more often also reached the Spiegel bestseller list shortly after their publication.

Since I remembered myself younger, a chicken has been depicted on every cover.

Bittl was married. She died at the end of October 2022 at the age of 59 and left behind a son.
