= Monika Mühlwerth =

Austrian politician

Member of the Federal Council

Personal details
- Born: 24 April 1954 (age 71)
- Party: Freedom Party of Austria

Monika Mühlwerth (born 24 April 1954) is an Austrian politician who is currently a Member of the Federal Council for the Freedom Party of Austria (FPÖ).
