= Monika Sadkowska =

Polish climate activist

Monika Emilia Sadkowska is a Polish climate activist, culture expert. Sadkowska is also Coordinator of Secretariat for Forum of Mayors for Just Transition which is a project from World Wildlife Fund Poland and coorganizer of Climate Camp in Świętno.

== Background and education ==
Sadkowska is an activist which based in Warsaw. She got her Bachelor degree as Cultural manager from SGH Warsaw School of Economics and get her Master of cultural studies from Institute of Polish Culture which based in University of Warsaw.

== Activism ==
Her activism started she knows about Comprehensive Economic and Trade Agreement with Transatlantic Trade and Investment Partnership and influenced by The geopolitics of Hunger book by Jean Ziegler,

She is also co-organizer of first Climate Camp in Poland which happened in July 2018 on Świętno. The event has been joined by around 400 participants. She also created Climate Choir in 2020 with Aleksandra Gryka. The Climate Choir has been organizing concert on the 18 September 2020.

== Career ==
Before she became an activist, Sadkowska was a vocalist for Żywiołak from 2008 to 2011. Monika replaced Izabella Byra on 2008 while she was on maternity leave. Currently, she is working in WWF Poland as a coordinator of Secretariat of the Forum of Mayors for Just Transition. Forum of Mayors for Just Transition is a forum where mayors exchange information and experience about the process of their town for leaving coal as source of energy.
