= Monika Silva Koniuszek =

Polish anti-corruption activist (1984/1985–2026)

- Born: Poland
- Died: 8 June 2026; Santa Elena Province, Ecuador
- Occupation: Activist
- Organisation: Fundación La Integridad

Monika Silva Koniuszek (1984 or 1985 – 8 June 2026) was a Polish activist based in Ecuador, acting on matters of corruption, environmental issues and human rights. She was the founder and director of Fundación La Integridad, a civil society organization focused on transparency, anticorruption, protecting the environment, and community rights. Her 2026 death drew international attention after she claimed she was receiving death threats due to her public accusations of corruption.

== Early life ==
Koniuszek was born in Poland and moved to Ecuador. She was a single mother with daughters aged 4 and 9.

== Activism ==
Koniuszek spent many years in Ecuador, where she became known as an activist. According to reports she wrote on her social media “You don’t need to be born in Ecuador to love it and defend what is right.” During her work there she founded and headed "Fundación La Integridad" to carry out her work. She collaborated with journalists, community organizations and activists, helping investigate land use, governance and public accountability.

One of her later investigations involved Noboa Trading, a fruit conglomerate belonging to the family of Daniel Noboa, Ecuador's president. According to reports the investigation was about several tonnes of cocaine found in the company's containers. It was reported that the investigation by Ecuadorian authorities was stalled by high ranking judicial officials.

Koniuszek claimed several times that she received death threats because of her anticorruption activities. Her colleagues noted that she was concerned about her personal safety.

== Death, investigation and reactions ==
Koniuszek was found dead at her home in Montañita, Santa Elena Province, on 8 June 2026, at age 41. Early reports claimed that authorities were investigating the case as suicide. However, family, colleagues and human rights organisations questioned the investigation. They called for the case to be investigated as a murder.

Her death caught international attention as the European Union Delegation to Ecuador called for an independent, thorough and transparent investigation. The Polish Prosecutor's office stated its desire to be part of the investigation and closely examine the findings, as Polish media extensively covered the case. Civil society organizations stated that this case reflects the danger anticorruption activists face.

== See also ==
- Human rights in Ecuador
- Whistleblower
