= Monika Beisner =

German artist and book illustrator

- Born: 1942 (age 83–84); Hamburg, Germany
- Known for: Artist, book illustrator

Monika Beisner (born 1942 in Hamburg) is a German artist and book illustrator.

== Life ==
Monika Beisner studied painting at the Hochschule für Bildende Künste Braunschweig (HBK) and - with a scholarship from the German Academic Exchange Service - at the Slade School of Fine Art, London and at the Berlin University of the Arts. A Fulbright scholarship enabled her to study in New York. Since 1970 she has lived as a freelance artist in London, Ratzeburg (Germany) and on Gozo (Malta).

== Work ==
=== Children's literature ===
Early in her career, Beisner was best known for her children's books, such as The Heavenly Zoo (1979) and Fabulous Beasts (1981), created in collaboration with the American writer Alison Lurie. Beisner's book Fantastic Toys (German: Wunderlicher Spielzeug-Katalog, 1973), first published in English in 1975, was selected by New York Review Books at the beginning of 2019 and reprinted in The New York Review Children’s Collection.

In September 2014, in an interview with Harvard professor Stephen or Stephanie Burt, an Anglist and Transgender activist, published in The Paris Review, the American poet and writer Matthea Harvey, born in Germany in 1973 but raised in England, named Beisner's Fantastic Toys as the earliest inspiration for her own artistic development. Asked which book to read to understand Harvey's lyrical work, she answered: "Fantastic Toys, by Monika Beisner. A book I read over and over again as a child. It features such wonders as a heated sheep toboggan and winged jumping boots. Four years ago, I discovered the reason we had that magical book - my mother had gone to elementary school with Monika. For me, it was as if she’d gone to school with Marilyn Monroe and never mentioned it."

=== Adult works ===
More recently, Beisner has concentrated on illustrating classic texts such as Dante's Divine Comedy and Ovid's Metamorphoses. The three-volume edition of Dante's Divine Comedy also includes an essay on Beisner by the historian and mythographer Marina Warner. She wrote: "The hundred miniatures took her seven years to complete and the achievement is dazzling. The present volume reproduces her work full-size, … with no strokes or drawing visible, but a pure glow of dense color, applied with brushes so small they consist of a half-dozen sable hairs. … Monika Beisner has been scrupulously loyal to Dante’s text, rendering gesture and position as described in the poem as well as its unsurpassed precision of spatial, geographical and temporal coordinates.“ Already Botticelli, William Blake, Gustave Doré and Salvador Dalí illustrated the Divine Comedy, but Beisner is the first woman to illustrate this important work of world literature. She has translated Dante's 100 songs into pictures as detailed and literal as possible, painted with egg tempera colours. All 100 of her original paintings for the Divine Comedy are in the collection of the Italian Dante collector Livio Ambrogio.

Beisner's illustrations for Ovid's Metamorphoses were published by Pratt Contemporary, as a portfolio of 36 digital prints.

She is currently working on a new collection of works related to Gilgamesh.

=== Dante's "Divine Comedy" ===
- Dante Alighieri: Die Göttliche Komödie. 3 vols. German by Karl Vossler. With colourful illustrations by Monika Beisner. 2nd. edition. Faber & Faber, Leipzig 2002, ISBN 3-932545-66-4.
- Dante Alighieri: Die Göttliche Komödie. 3 vols. German by Karl Vossler. With colourful illustrations by Monika Beisner. Special edition with three half parchment volumes in half parchment slipcase. Faber & Faber, Leipzig 2002, ISBN 3-932545-78-8.
- Dante Alighieri: Commedia. Edizione Privata. Illustrata da Monika Beisner. Stamperia Valdonega, Verona 2005.
- Dante Alighieri: Comedy. Inferno, Purgatorio, Paradiso. Translated by Robert and Jean Hollander, illustrated by Monika Beisner. Edizioni Valdonega, Verona 2007.

=== Ovid's "Metamorphoses" ===
- Metamorphoses. A Portfolio of 36 Giclée Prints Printed by Pratt Contemporary, England 2010.

=== Children's books ===
- The Thumbtown Toad. Prentice Hall, USA 1971, ISBN 0-13-920603-5.
- Wunderlicher Spielzeug-Katalog. Broschek, Hamburg 1973, ISBN 3-87102-044-3.
- Fantastic Toys. Follet, Chicago 1975, ISBN 0-695-40504-7.
- Die Geburtstagsreise. Insel, Frankfurt am Main 1976, ISBN 3-458-05758-7.
- Ramses in Rio Moto. J.M. Dent, London 1977, ISBN 0-460-06850-4.
- Das Adressbuch für Kinder. Insel, Frankfurt am Main 1977, ISBN 3-458-31994-8.
- An Address Book with riddles, rhymes, tales and tongue-twisters. Eel Pie Publishing, London 1978, ISBN 0-906008-43-3.
- Le livre de tous mes amis. Mon premier carnet d'adresses. Ausgewählte Gedichte von Jean Georges. Gallimard, Paris 1978.
- Das Stern Bilderbuch. Mit Bildern und alten Legenden. Ein Insel-Bilderbuch. Insel, Frankfurt am Main 1979, ISBN 3-458-05675-0.
- A Folding Alphabet Book. Farrar Straus Giroux, New York 1979, ISBN 0-374-32420-4.
- The Heavenly Zoo. Texts by Alison Lurie. Farrar Straus Giroux, New York 1979, ISBN 0-529-05593-7.
- Fabulous Beasts. Texts by Alison Lurie. Jonathan Cape, London 1981, ISBN 0-224-01971-6.
- Book of Riddles. Jonathan Cape, London 1983, ISBN 0-224-02091-9.
- Secret Spells and Curious Charms. Jonathan Cape, London 1985, ISBN 0-224-02282-2.
- Verkehrte Welt. Ein Insel-Bilderbuch. Insel, Frankfurt am Main 1987, ISBN 3-458-14604-0.
- Catch that Cat. Faber and Faber, London 1990, ISBN 0-571-14170-6.
- El mundo a revés. Lumen, Barcelona 1991, ISBN 84-264-3647-1.
- Von fliegenden und sprechenden Bäumen. Alte und neue Baummärchen. Carl Hanser, München/ Wien 1994, ISBN 3-446-16377-8.
- Goldblatt und Silberwurzel. Alte und neue Baummärchen aus aller Welt. Sanssouci, Zürich 1998, ISBN 3-7254-1129-8.
- Les cent plus belles devinettes. Gallimard, Paris 1999, ISBN 2-07-056192-5.
- Fantastic Toys. A Catalogue. The New York Review Children’s Collection, New York 2019, ISBN 9781681373119.
- Das Sternbilderbuch. Insel-Bücherei Nr. 1519, Insel, Berlin 2022, ISBN 978-3-458-19519-1.
- This into That. A story of changes invented by Victor Rees after a scattering of pictures by Monika Beisner. Child Be Strange, London 2025, ISBN 978-1-7398595-3-4.

== Exhibitions ==
- 2025: Compton Verney Museum, Warwickshire, UK, The Shelter of Stories (curated by British historian and mythographer Marina Warner, Beisner is present with four paintings from her Gilgamesh series of 29 images), 25 October 2025 – 22 February 2026
- 2023: Art Space Gallery, London, UK, Monika Beisner - Forest of Things, Paintings and Drawings, 20 January – 3 March 2023
- 2022: Italian Cultural Institute, London, UK, Dante ipermoderno. Illustrazioni dantesche nel mondo, 1983-2020, 4 March – 7 April 2022
- 2021/2022: Ashmolean Museum, Oxford, UK, Dante, the Invention of Celebrity, 17 September 2021 – 9 January 2022
- 2021: Biblioteca Nazionale Universitaria di Torino, Turino, Italy, Dante alla Biblioteca Nazionale (all 100 Originals from Livio Ambrogio's aus Dante Collection ), 21 September – 10 October 2021
- 2015: Chapel, Trinity College Dublin, Ireland, Exhibition related to the Marathon Reading of Dante’s ‘Divine Comedy’, 11 December 2015
- 2014: A. Paul Weber-Museum, Ratzeburg, Germany, Illustrationen zu Ovid und Dante, 5 September – 7 December 2014
- 2012: Kulturzentrum am Münster, Constance, Germany, Das irdische Jenseits, Monika Beisners Dante-Illustrationen und ihre Druckgraphikmappe zu Ovids Metamorphosen, 13 October – 11 November 2012.
- 2011: Palazzo Incontro, Rome, Italy, Dante a Palazzo Incontro. Il sorriso in folio della Commedia, 21 June – 31 July 2011.
- 2008: Istituto Italiano di Cultura, Valletta, Malta, The Divine Comedy Illustrated, 21 April – 8 May 2008 on the occasion of the award of an honorary doctorate by the University of Malta to the Italian actor and Dante expert Roberto Benigni on 21 April 2008.
- 2006: Library of Universität Cambridge, Cambridge, UK, 17 January – 1 July 2006
- 2006 Hishio Center for Cultural Exchange, Katsuyama, District Okayama, Japan, An Exhibition of Original Illustrations by Monika Beisner, 29 April – 15 May 2006.
- 2003: Bibliotheca Wittockiana, Brussels, Belgium, 5 October 2003 – 10 January 2004.
- 2002: Science Museum, London, UK, 14 October 2002 – 16 February 2003
- 1995: Library of Universität Konstanz, Constance, Germany, 12 June – 15 July 1995.

== Literature/Articles ==
- Belinda Hunt: Monika Beisner's Illuminations for the Divine Comedy of Dante Alighieri. In: Temendos Academy Review 21, 2018, pp. 111-112.
- Dante - Poeta e Italiano. Salerno Editrice, Roma 2011.
- Chiara Nicolini: La mano di Monika Beisner rilegge la “Commedia”. Un’illustratrice contemporanea dal gusto quasi medioevale. In: La Biblioteca di via Senato - Milano. Anno II, N. 10/18, 2010, pp. 45–53.
- Marina Warner: Monika Beisner: Illuminating Stories. In: Dante Alighieri: Comedy. Vol. 3: Paradiso. Translated by Robert und Jean Hollander, illustrated by Monika Beisner. Edizioni Valdonega, Verona 2007, pp. 228-235.
- Peter S. Hawkins: Dante. A Brief History. Blackwell Publishing, Oxford 2006.
- Ronald de Rooy (Hrsg.): Divine Comedies for the New Millennium. Recent Dante Translations in America and the Netherlands. Amsterdam University Press, Amsterdam 2003.
- Arnd Brummer: Dantes Göttliche Komödie. In: Chrismon plus, Magazine 09/2001.
- Johannes Wendland: Sieben Jahre von der Hölle bis ins Paradies. In: Chrismon plus, Magazine 09/2001.
- Wolfram Vogel: Von Bäumen in Bildern. Monika Beisners faszinierende Buchmalerei. In: Südkurier/Wochenend-Kurier. 8/9 July 1995, pp. 6–7.
