= Monika Motsch =

German sinologist (born 1942)

- Born: 1942 (age 83–84); Germany
- Education: Heidelberg University
- Occupations: Sinologist, professor
- Spouse: Richard Motsch (m. 1968)
- Writing career
- Language: Chinese, German, English
- Notable works: Fortress Besieged; We Three

Monika Motsch (Chinese: 莫芝宜佳; born 1942) is a German sinologist who works as a professor at the University of Bonn and University of Erlangen–Nuremberg.

== Biography ==
Monika Motsch was born in Germany in 1942. In 1971, she earned her doctor's degree in Sinology from Heidelberg University. From 1973 to 2004, she successively worked as lecturer and professor at the University of Bonn. She was director of the Department of Sinology of the University of Erlangen–Nuremberg in 1998, and held that office until 2000. From 2012 to 2014, she was a foreign specialist of Tsinghua University. During that time, she worked with her husband Richard Motsch, Tsinghua Case Museum and Commercial Publishing House to sort out Qian Zhongshu's Foreign Language Notes.

== Personal life ==
In 1968, she was married to Richard Motsch (莫律祺), who is a lawyer.

== Works ==
- Ezra Pound und china [Ezra Pound and China] (in German). Winter. 1976. ISBN 978-3533024286.
- Mit Bambusrohr und Ahle: Von Qian Zhongshus "Guanzhuibian zu einer Neubetrachtung Du Fus (in German). Peter Lang GmbH, Internationaler Verlag der Wissenschaften. 1994. ISBN 978-3631477397.
- 中国中短篇叙事文学史——从古代到近代 [History of Chinese Short and Medium Narrative Literature: From Ancient to Modern Times] (in Chinese). Shanghai: East China Normal University Press. 2008. ISBN 978-7561760765.
- 《管锥编》与杜甫新解 [New Interpretation of "Tube Cone Braiding" and Du Fu] (in Chinese). Shijiazhuang, Hebei: Hebei Education Press. 1998. ISBN 9787543430914.

=== Translations ===
- Fortress Besieged (Qian Zhongshu) (围城)
- We Three (Yang Jiang) (我们仨)

== Awards ==
- Jane Scatcherd Translation Award
- Special Book Awards of China (2012)
