= Wola massacre =

1944 extermination of civilians by Nazi forces in Wola, Warsaw, Poland

Coordinates: 52.23°N 20.96°E

- Part of Nazi war crimes during the Warsaw Uprising
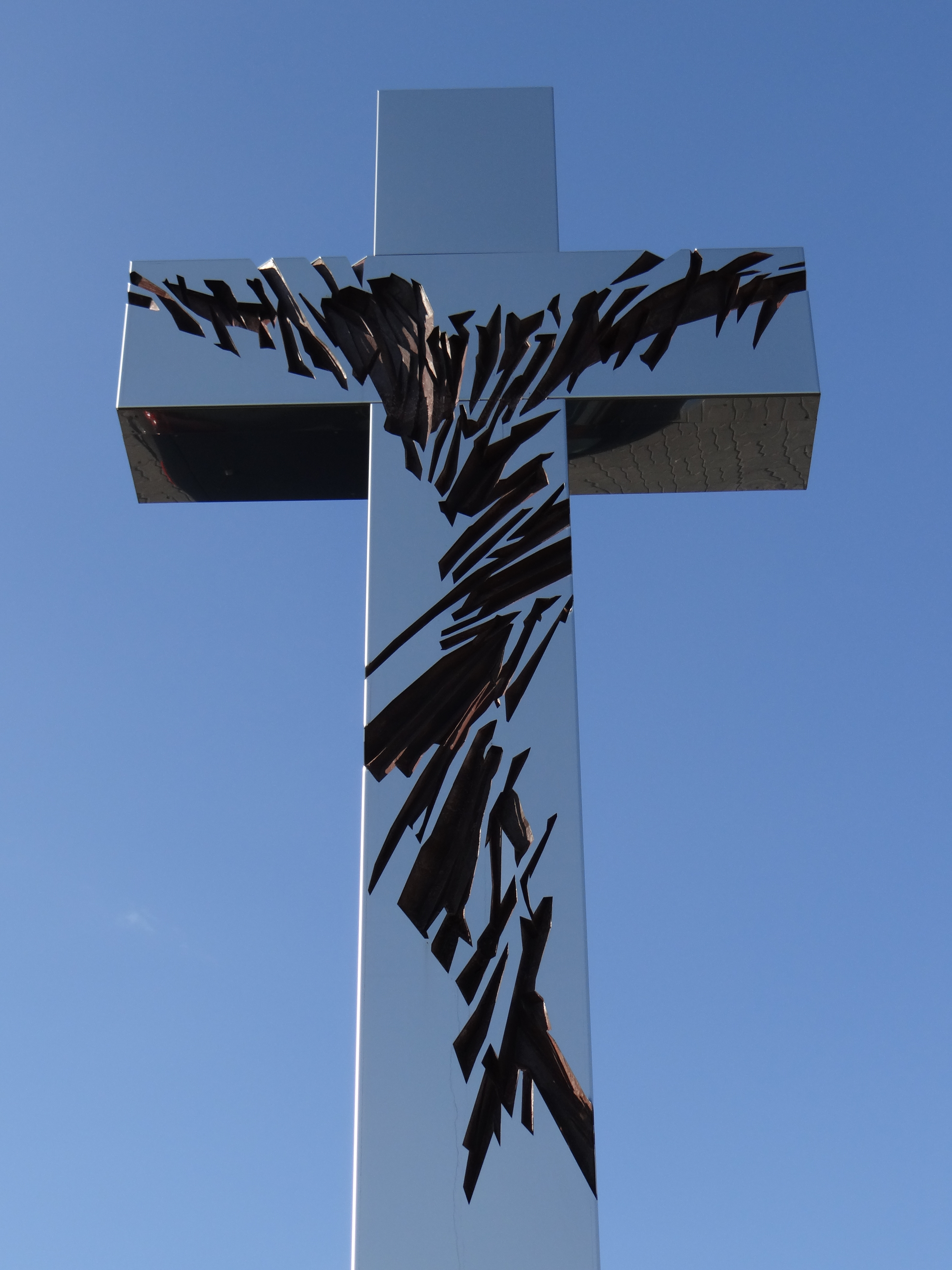
- The Wola Genocide Memorial on Górczewska Street at the location of the railway embankment where up to 10,000 people were shot and then burned by the Germans between 5 and 8 August 1944
- Location: Wola, Warsaw
- Date: 5–12 August 1944
- Target: Poles
- Attack type: Genocidal massacre, mass execution, wartime rape
- Deaths: 40,000–50,000
- Perpetrators: Nazi Germany: Ordnungspolizei; SS; SS-Sonderregiment Dirlewanger; Russian People's Liberation Army; Azerbaijani Legion
- Motive: Warsaw Uprising suppression, Anti-Polish sentiment, Germanisation, reprisal

The Wola massacre (Polish: Rzeź Woli, lit. 'Wola slaughter') was the systematic killing of between 40,000 and 50,000 Poles in the Wola neighbourhood of the Polish capital city, Warsaw, by the German Waffen-SS, Ordnungpolizei, the Azerbaijani Legion, Sicherheitdienst and the SS-Sonderregiment Dirlewanger, which took place from 5 to 12 August 1944. The massacre was ordered by Heinrich Himmler, who directed to kill "anything that moves" to stop the Warsaw Uprising soon after it began. (Note: According to evidence given by Erich von dem Bach at the Nürnberg trial, Himmler's order (issued on the strength of an order from Adolf Hitler), read as follows: 1. Captured insurrectionists shall be killed whether or not they fight in accordance with the Hague Convention. 2. The non-fighting part of the population, women, children, shall also be killed. 3. The whole city shall be razed to the ground, i.e. its buildings, streets, facilities, and everything within its borders. —Wroniszewski 1970, pp.128–129.)

Tens of thousands of Polish civilians along with captured Home Army resistance fighters were murdered by the Germans in organised mass executions throughout Wola. Whole families, including babies, children and the elderly, were often shot on the spot, but some were killed after torture and sexual assault. Soldiers murdered patients in hospitals, killing them in their beds, as well as the doctors and nurses caring for them. Dogs were let loose to find survivors to be killed. The operation was led by Erich von dem Bach-Zelewski, though its most infamous perpetrators were the SS-Sonderregiment Dirlewanger whose forces committed the cruelest atrocities, drawing criticism from Bach-Zelewski himself. However, recent research has shown that the participation of Dirlewanger in the early days of the massacre was limited, and it was the German police forces under Heinz Reinefarth that carried out the majority of murders.

The Germans anticipated that these atrocities would crush the insurrectionists' will to fight and put the uprising to a swift end. However, the ruthless pacification of Wola only stiffened Polish resistance, and it took another two months of heavy fighting for the Germans to force an agreement providing for the forces in Warsaw to give themselves up.

== Hitler's order to destroy Warsaw ==
Warsaw was regarded by the German occupiers as the center of Polish resistance against the Nazi New Order. Despite efforts to reduce the Polish capital to the status of a provincial town under the General Government, Warsaw remained a hub of Polish political, intellectual, and cultural life. It was also the headquarters of the Polish Underground State and home to highly organized resistance structures. General Governor Hans Frank noted in his diary on 14 December 1943:

We have one point in this country from which all evil emanates: that is Warsaw. If we didn't have Warsaw in the General Government, we wouldn't have 4/5 of the difficulties we face. Warsaw is and will remain the center of unrest, the point from which unrest spreads throughout this land.

The outbreak of the Warsaw Uprising on 1 August 1944 was seen by Nazi leaders as an ideal opportunity to resolve the "Polish problem". During a speech on 21 September 1944 at Jägerhöhe, addressed to military district commanders and school commandants, Reichsführer-SS Heinrich Himmler recounted that upon learning of the uprising, he immediately approached Hitler and declared:

My Führer, the time is not very favorable for us. From a historical perspective, however, it is a blessing that the Poles are doing this. In five or six weeks, we will emerge from this. And afterward, Warsaw – the capital, the head, the intellect of this former 16–17-million-strong Polish nation – will be destroyed. This nation, which for 700 years has blocked our path to the East and has stood in our way since the First Battle of Tannenberg [in 1410]. Then, historically, the Polish problem will no longer be a significant issue for our children or anyone who comes after us – even for us.

Hitler, still recovering from the recent assassination attempt on his life, entrusted the task of regaining control over Warsaw not to the Wehrmacht generals – whom he deeply distrusted – but to Himmler. Hitler likely intended this brutal suppression of the uprising to serve as a clear signal to his enemies and wavering allies that he had not lost control. Furthermore, like Himmler, he believed that destroying the Polish capital would secure the "racial future of Germany". It is believed that during a meeting held on the night of August 1–2 or early on August 2, Hitler issued Himmler and General Heinz Guderian, Chief of Staff of Oberkommando des Heeres, an oral order to level Warsaw and exterminate all its inhabitants. According to SS-Obergruppenführer Erich von dem Bach-Zelewski, appointed commander of the forces tasked with suppressing the uprising, the order stated:

Every inhabitant must be killed; no prisoners are to be taken. Warsaw is to be razed to the ground, creating a terrifying example for all of Europe.

SS-Brigadeführer Ernst Rode, von dem Bach's chief of staff, testified post-war that SS-Oberführer Oskar Dirlewanger, the commander of one of the units assigned to the uprising, received a handwritten order from Himmler. The order, issued in Hitler's name, instructed Dirlewanger to destroy Warsaw and granted him the authority to "kill anyone he wished, as he pleased". The order to destroy Warsaw was also conveyed to the commanders of the German garrison in Warsaw. SS-Oberführer Paul Otto Geibel, SS and Police Leader for the Warsaw District, testified after the war that on the evening of August 1, Himmler had instructed him by telephone: "Destroy tens of thousands". Hitler's order applied not only to SS and police units under Himmler but also to Wehrmacht forces.

== German crimes in Wola from 1–4 August ==
=== "Human shields" and first executions ===
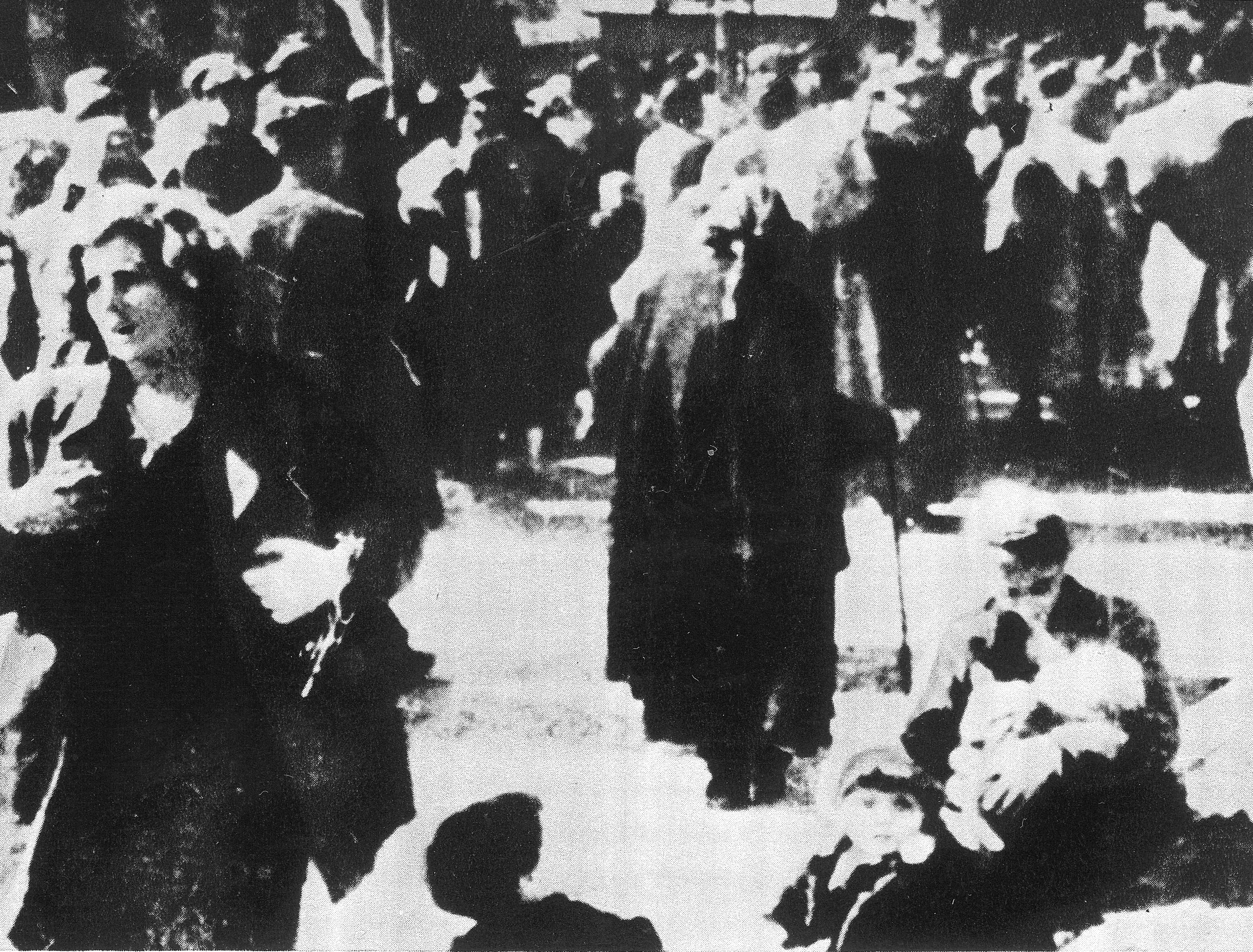
Residents of Wola being expelled from their homes in August 1944

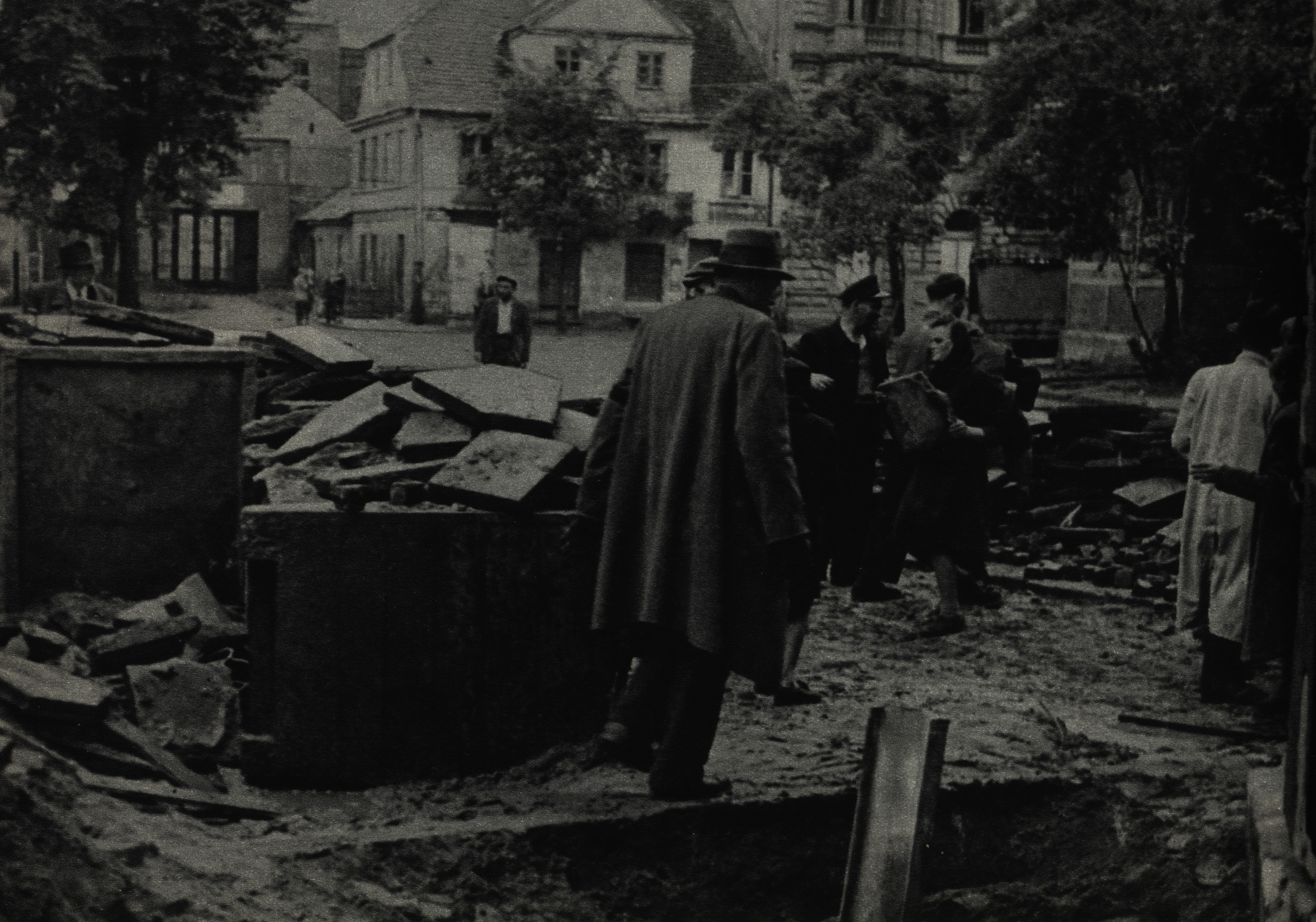
Building of a barricade on one of Wola's streets

The Warsaw Uprising broke out on 1 August 1944. During the first few days the Polish resistance managed to liberate most of Warsaw on the left bank of the river Vistula (an uprising also broke out in the district of Praga on the right bank of the river but was quickly suppressed by the Germans). Two days after the start of the fighting, SS General Erich von dem Bach-Zelewski was placed in command of all German forces in Warsaw. Following direct orders from SS-Reichsführer Heinrich Himmler to suppress the uprising without mercy, his strategy was to include the use of terror tactics against the inhabitants of Warsaw. No distinction would be made between insurrectionists and civilians as Himmler's orders explicitly stated that Warsaw was to be completely destroyed and that the civilian population was to be exterminated. (Note: "[...] The Führer is not interested in the further existence of Warsaw [...] the whole population shall be executed and all buildings blown up. —Madajczyk 1972, p.390)

Professor Timothy Snyder, of Yale University, wrote that "the massacres in Wola had nothing in common with combat ... the ratio of civilian to military dead was more than a thousand to one, even if military casualties on both sides are counted."

From the first hours of the uprising, the German forces in the Warsaw garrison committed numerous war crimes. Captured insurgents were executed, and the wounded were finished off. Civilians also became victims of these atrocities. Special orders from Hitler were not necessary for these actions, as General Reiner Stahel, as the commander of the Warsaw garrison, had the authority to "use all measures against the civilian population in Warsaw necessary to maintain peace, security, and order".

The crimes committed by the Germans in Wola were initially not aimed at the complete extermination of the district's population but were more acts of retaliation for the outbreak of the uprising. The main targets of executions were men suspected of participating in the fighting. On the afternoon of August 1, before the official start of the uprising at "W" Hour, the Germans carried out a mass execution at 28 Sowiński Street (corner of Karliński Street). In retaliation for an earlier skirmish with Polish soldiers heading to assembly points, eight randomly captured Polish men were executed there. At the beginning of the fighting, German infantry, supported by tanks, surprised the insurgent groups of lieutenants Ostoja and Gromada from the Wola Subdistrict. After crushing the Polish units, the Germans conducted a sweep on the streets of Koło, finishing off the wounded and executing captured soldiers of the Home Army. On August 1, the Germans also killed several civilians in a house on 20 Okopowa Street and set fire to the "Piekiełko" house at 165 Wolska Street, executing six Polish men there as well.

Due to the enemy's numerical and technical superiority, the Wola Subdistrict units were unable to capture most of their designated targets. Only part of the district was briefly under insurgent control. A major factor in the course of the battles in Wola was the fact that one of the most important communication routes in the city, the Wolska–Chłodna–Elektoralna–Senatorska–Kierbedź Bridge route (known as the Wola artery), passed through this district. In the summer of 1944, this was one of the key supply routes for the German forces on the right bank of the Vistula river. Starting from the morning of August 2, German frontline units attempted to unblock this critical artery, which led to intense defensive fighting by the Polish units in Wola right from the beginning of the uprising. The enemy's attacks intensified each day, accompanied by numerous war crimes committed against prisoners and civilians. Wola would become one of the districts of Warsaw where, even before the organized "rescue forces" sent by Himmler arrived, the Germans had committed some of the most severe violations of the laws of war.

Between August 1 and 4, soldiers of the 1st Fallschirm-Panzer Division Hermann Göring fighting in Wola murdered approximately 400 captured insurgents, including many wounded. Simultaneously, units of this division, supported by soldiers of the 608th Security Regiment, systematically expelled Polish civilians from residential buildings, committing murders, looting, and raping women in the process. On August 2, 23 Polish men were rounded up in a garden at 43 Zawisza Street and killed with grenades. Another 15 men were murdered in a house at 9/11 Magistracka Street. On the same day, a group of men from a house at 26 Sokołowska Street (corner of Górczewska Street) and seven men taken from homes at 17 and 19 Prądzyński Street were executed. Additionally, August 2 marked the day when the first group of civilians was imprisoned in the church of Saint Stanislaus Bishop at 76 Wolska Street (subsequent groups, initially small, were brought there on August 3 and 4). On August 3, German soldiers wearing insurgent armbands deceitfully captured houses at 12, 14, and 16 Młynarska Street. They massacred residents hiding in the basements, using grenades thrown inside.

German units fighting in Wola routinely used Polish civilians, including women and children, as "human shields" to cover infantry or tank assaults. Captured Poles were also forced to dismantle barricades under fire. Wehrmacht units first employed this criminal tactic in Warsaw, followed later by SS and police units. On August 2, soldiers of the 1st Fallschirm-Panzer Division Hermann Göring used 50 Poles tied to a ladder as a shield for tanks advancing on insurgent positions near Okopowa Street. This was the first recorded instance during the uprising of Polish civilians being used as "human shields". The following day, as German tanks attacked insurgent barricades on Wolska Street, a group of men and women was driven ahead of the armored column to serve as a shield for the vehicles and as labor to dismantle the barricades. The attack was repelled; some hostages were freed by the insurgents, but many others were killed in the crossfire.

In the late morning hours, a strong armored column belonging to the 1st Fallschirm-Panzer Division Hermann Göring launched another assault along Wolska Street. Approximately 300 Polish civilians (women and men) were driven ahead of the tanks as shields. The German column managed to break through the insurgent barricades and reached the vicinity of the Poniatowski Bridge via Towarowa Street and Jerusalem Avenue. Only there were the surviving hostages released. German tank crews also used Polish civilians as "human shields" during battles in Wola on August 4.

=== Arrival of the "relief forces" ===
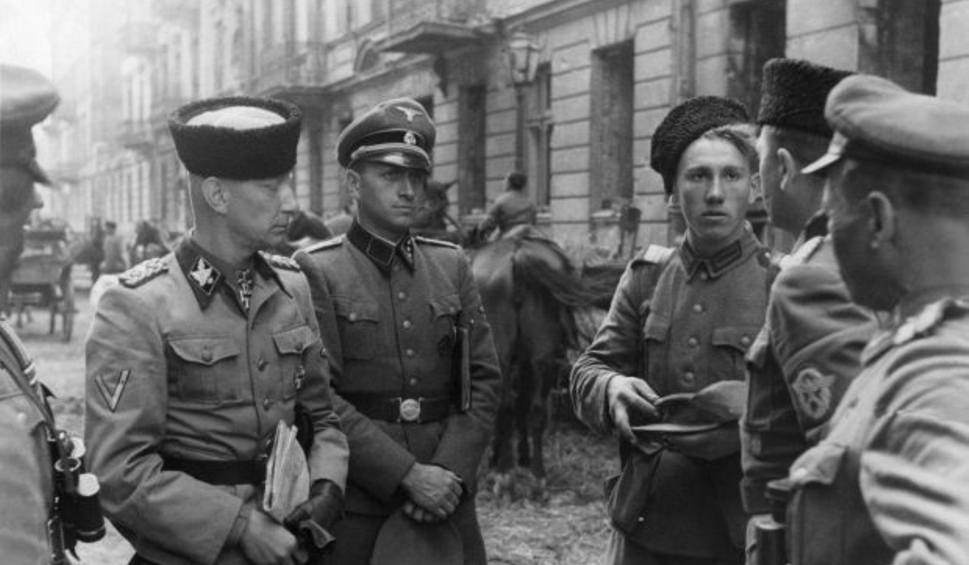
SS-Gruppenführer Heinz Reinefarth with soldiers of the 3rd Cossack Regiment

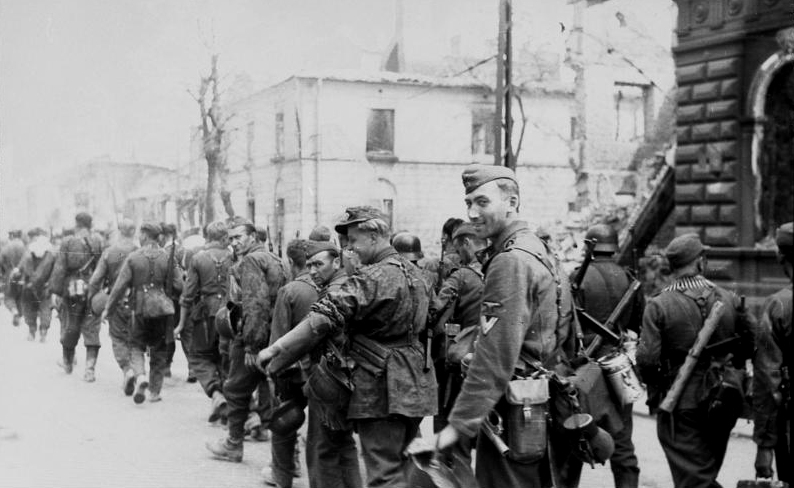
II. Battalion "Kampfgruppe Steinhauer" from the SS-Sonderregiment Dirlewanger marching along Chłodna Street towards the city centre

While the outbreak of the Warsaw Uprising did not tactically surprise the Germans, it was an operational shock. Therefore, the German command could only deploy units to Warsaw that were available given the situation on the Eastern Front. On August 2, Reichsführer-SS Heinrich Himmler flew to Poznań, where, along with local Gauleiter Arthur Greiser and General Walter Petzel, commander of the XXI Military District, he began forming a police group to assist the German garrison in Warsaw. Himmler placed SS-Gruppenführer Heinz Reinefarth, Higher SS and Police Leader in the Wartheland, in command of this group.

The first wave of German forces deployed against the uprising included:

- An improvised police group from the Wartheland under SS-Gruppenführer Heinz Reinefarth. According to documents cited in Hanns von Krannhals' monograph, this group initially included two and a half companies of motorized security police, a motorized gendarmerie company, an emergency cadet battalion from the XXI Military District, and a company from the SS-Junkerschule Braunschweig. Hubert Kuberski states that as of August 4, the Wartheland units comprised about 1,000 policemen and soldiers.
- SS-Sonderregiment Dirlewanger. This unit specialized in brutal pacification operations behind the Eastern Front. Most of its personnel were German soldiers from the Waffen-SS and Wehrmacht who had been court-martialed, individuals convicted of "antisocial behavior", and criminals from concentration camps. They were pardoned in exchange for fighting for the National Socialist Volksgemeinschaft. The regiment's units arrived in Warsaw gradually. When the assault on Wola began, only the staff and the 1st Battalion, led by SS-Obersturmführer Herbert Meyer (365 men), were present. The 2nd Battalion, commanded by Hauptmann der Schutzpolizei Josef Steinhauer, joined the fight on August 7. SS-Standartenführer Oskar Dirlewanger himself arrived in Warsaw on August 7, so during the fighting in Wola, the regiment was commanded by his deputy and chief of staff, SS-Sturmbannführer Kurt Weiße.
- The Waffen-Sturmbrigade der SS RONA (Russian People's Liberation Army), led by Waffen-Brigadeführer Bronislav Kaminski. This collaborationist unit consisted mostly of Russians and Belarusians. After the uprising began, a storm regiment was formed from its soldiers under Waffen-Sturmbannführer Ivan Frolov, composed of approximately 1,700 unmarried men.
- The 608th Security Regiment, commanded by Colonel Willi Schmidt.
- Two Azerbaijani battalions (a battalion from the Bergmann Battalion and the 1st Battalion of the 111th Regiment).

By August 4, the first wave of "relief forces" had completed its concentration in Warsaw's suburbs. The units began offensive operations the next day. General Nikolaus von Vormann, commanding the German 9th Army operating in the region, temporarily reinforced them with a reserve battalion from the Hermann Göring Armoured Paratrooper Division (approximately 800 soldiers). German plans envisioned the "relief forces" advancing along two axes:

- The Wartheland police units and the 1st Battalion "Kampfgruppe Meyer" of the SS-Sonderregiment Dirlewanger, reinforced by two Azerbaijani companies from the Bergmann Special Unit, were to attack Wola. Their advance was to proceed first along Wolska Street and through areas to the north and south of it, then towards Grzybowska and Chłodna streets. The goal was to free Governor Ludwig Fischer and General Reiner Stahel, whom the insurgents had surrounded in the "government district" near Piłsudski Square, and then to break through to the Kierbedź Bridge, reopening the Wola artery. The reserve for this group was the battalion from the Hermann Göring Division. The assault on Wola was personally commanded by SS-Gruppenführer Heinz Reinefarth.
- A combined regiment from the Waffen-Sturmbrigade der SS RONA was to attack Ochota, advancing first along Grójecka Street and then along Jerusalem Avenue and through the area around the Warsaw Water Filters, with the objective of reopening access to the Poniatowski Bridge.

== "Black Saturday" – massacre on August 5 ==
=== Meeting at Reinefarth's command post ===
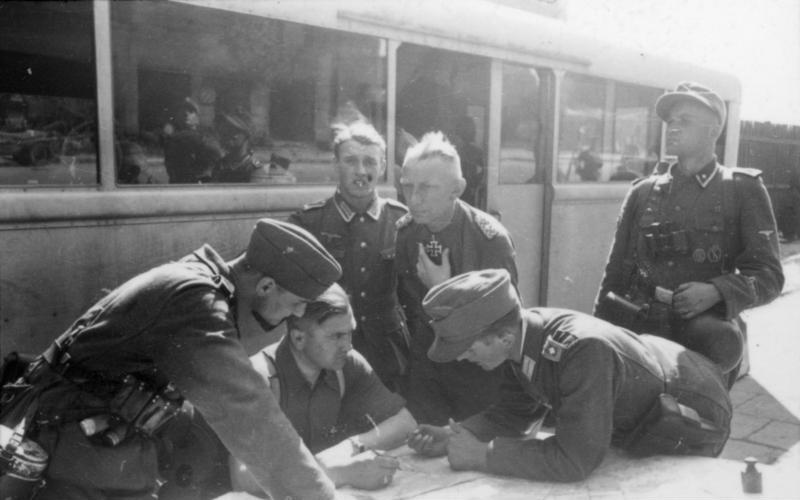
Reinefarth's command post during the Wola battles (corner of Wolska and Syrena streets)

In the early morning of August 5, a briefing took place at Reinefarth's command post near the intersection of Wolska and Syrena streets. During this meeting, the attack plan against the insurgent positions was discussed. The details of the meeting can only be reconstructed based on testimonies given by participants during investigations against Reinefarth in West Germany in the 1960s. These testimonies, however, cannot be regarded as fully reliable.

Fritz Werner, a company commander in the cadet battalion from the 5th Infantry Officers' School in Poznań, claimed that Reinefarth began the briefing by describing the situation in the city. He allegedly emphasized the urgent need to assist the defenders of the "government district", mentioning supposed atrocities committed by Polish insurgents against German prisoners. Werner and another officer testified that SS-Gruppenführer Reinefarth issued orders that were vague, likely due to his lack of staff experience. German witnesses also claimed that no explicit order to murder Polish civilians not involved in the uprising was given during the meeting.

However, Reinefarth reportedly made it clear that all Warsaw residents were participating in the uprising, warranting the city's destruction and merciless treatment of the rebels. Friedrich Peterburs, commander of a police battalion from the Wartheland, stated that Reinefarth ordered his subordinates to consider every person encountered as a "participant in the uprising", threatening court-martial for anyone who failed to show "proper energy".

Explicit directives were given to rank-and-file soldiers. SS non-commissioned officer Helmut Wagner, a platoon leader in the SS-Sonderregiment Dirlewanger, testified while in Soviet captivity that on the morning of 5 August 1944, a Himmler order was read to his unit, instructing them to kill both insurgents and civilians and to destroy the city. Another soldier from the same regiment recalled a similar order from his platoon leader: "Burn everything! Spare no one! Take no prisoners!" A platoon commander in a police battalion from the Wartheland, interrogated after the war by a West German prosecutor, testified that a message was read to his unit on that day: "The Führer has ordered the complete destruction of Warsaw". The policemen reportedly interpreted this as "burn everything along with its inhabitants". Similarly, German Feldgendarmerie units received orders to "kill everyone in their path; no prisoners are to be taken".

=== Beginning of the German offensive in Wola ===
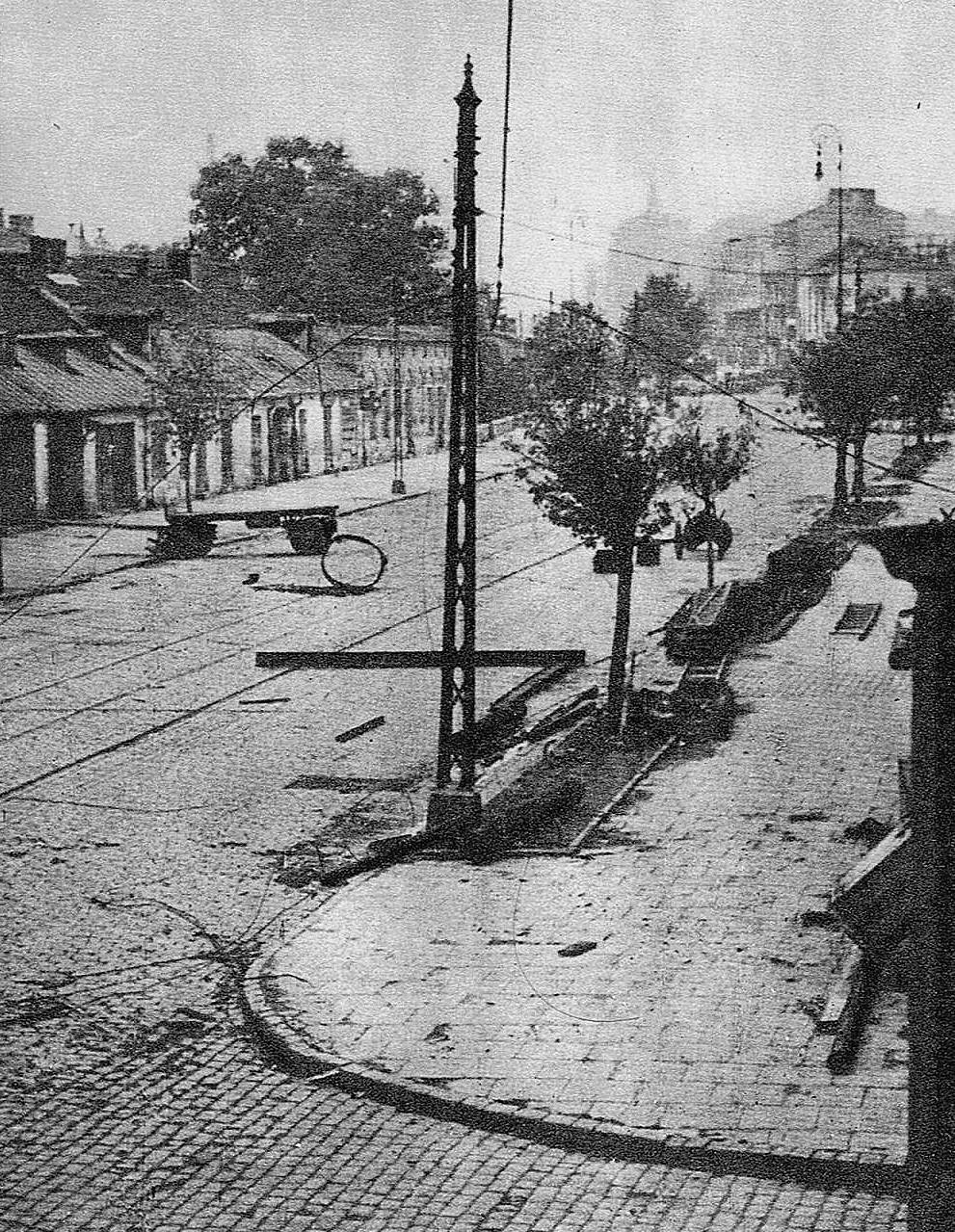
Wolska Street in the first days of August 1944

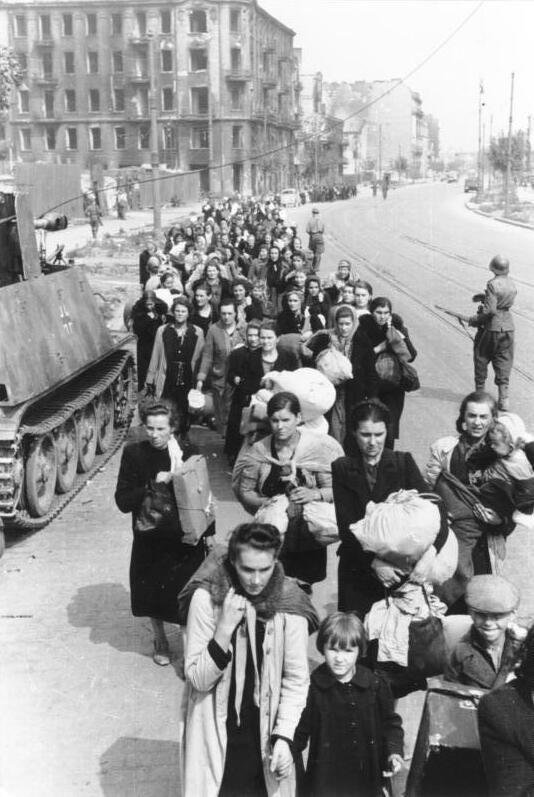
A column of Polish women with children being led by German troops along Wolska Street in early August 1944

On August 5, at 7:00 AM, the "relief forces" began their assault on Wola. Three German battle groups started their advance toward the city centre from the western outskirts of the Wola district, along Wolska and Górczewska streets. The German forces consisted of units from the Wehrmacht and the SS Police Battalions, and the 1st Battalion "Kampfgruppe Meyer" under SS-Bataillonführer Herbert Meyer from SS-Sonderregiment Dirlewanger, an infamous Waffen SS penal unit led by Oskar Dirlewanger, which included the Azerbaijani Legion (part of the Ostlegionen). British historian Martin Windrow described Dirlewanger's unit as a "terrifying rabble" of "cut-throats, [foreign] renegades, sadistic morons, and cashiered rejects from other units". On the left flank, north of Wolska Street, the assault was carried out by the cadet battalion from the XXI Military District and a company from the SS-Junkerschule Braunschweig.

At this time, the main forces of the Radosław Group, the strongest and best-armed insurgent formation in Wola, were engaged in the area of the Wola cemeteries and the ruins of the Warsaw Ghetto. As a result, the primary resistance along the main axis of the German offensive came from the units of the Wola Subdistrict and the People's Army, which were poorly armed and significantly weakened by earlier battles.

Despite their clear advantage, the Germans made limited progress initially. It was only around 10:30 AM that Reinefarth's police forces managed to breach a Polish barricade at the intersection of Górczewska and Działdowska streets. For several hours, the 1st Company of the Parasol Battalion, led by Cadet Sergeant Janusz Brochwicz-Lewiński, codenamed Gryf, defended the so-called Michler's Palace at 40 Wolska Street against repeated attacks by one of the companies of the 1st Battalion of the SS-Sonderregiment Dirlewanger. However, the other companies of the Dirlewanger's regiment, attacking on the right flank, managed by noon to seize the tram depot on Młynarska Street and subsequently the nearby St. Stanislaus Infectious Diseases Hospital. Between 2:00 PM and 3:00 PM, threatened with encirclement, the insurgents were forced to abandon the Michler's Palace and the key barricade at the intersection of Wolska and Młynarska streets. By late afternoon, the Germans repelled a counterattack by the Radosław Group and, having captured St. Lazarus Hospital, reached the area of Kerceli Square by evening.

Despite certain successes in the German offensive, the Wola artery remained blocked by the insurgents. That evening, the staff of Army Group "Środek" was forced to report that "despite the use of tanks and dive bombers, the insurgents are defending themselves with extraordinary persistence" and that "there is no indication of a decline in resistance". German losses were significant, particularly among the inexperienced ranks of the SS-Sonderregiment Dirlewanger.

=== Extermination of Wola's civilian population ===
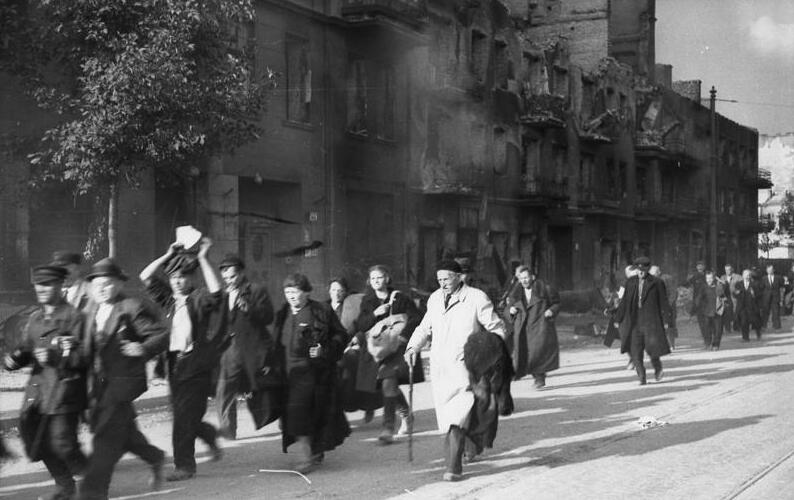
Civilians driven along Wolska Street

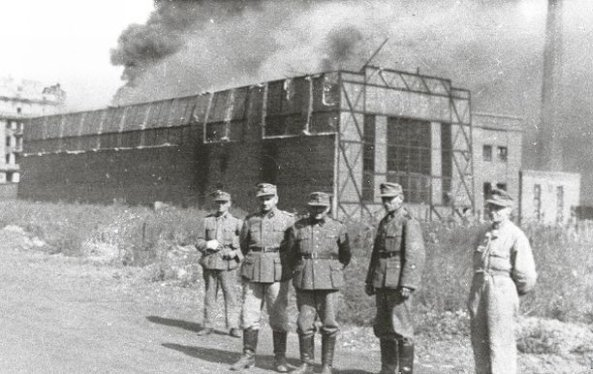
Ursus factory – execution site of nearly 6,000 Wola residents

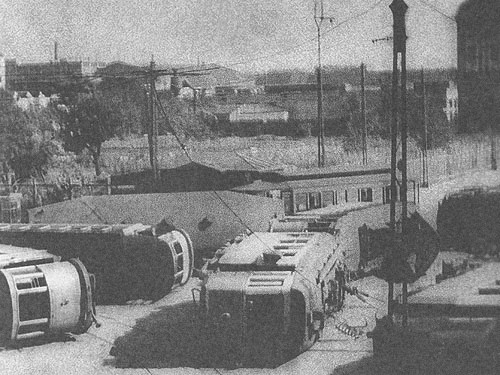
Tram depot on Młynarska Street: foreground showing an insurgent barricade made of tram cars

From the morning hours of August 5, a massacre of the Polish civilian population was underway in Wola. Following Hitler's orders to the letter, SS officers and police murdered every Pole they captured, regardless of age or gender. Mass executions were carried out in the conquered areas. However, the extermination campaign reached its largest scale in parts of Wola that had been under German control since the first hours of the uprising. The mass executions were accompanied by rapes of women and girls, as well as widespread looting. Civilians not immediately murdered were forced to act as "human shields" on insurgent barricades. This day became known in Wola's history as "Black Saturday".

Initially, Wola's civilians were killed chaotically and indiscriminately – in apartments, basements, courtyards, and streets. Several buildings were set on fire, and residents fleeing in panic were gunned down with machine guns. Thousands of people died in this way, including approximately 2,000 residents of the so-called Hankiewicz Houses at 105/109 Wolska Street and between 2,000 and 3,000 residents of the Wawelberg Houses at 15 Górczewska Street. Civilians hiding in basements were often killed with grenades. There were acts of exceptional brutality, including stabbing defenseless people with bayonets, burying the wounded alive, smashing infants' heads, and throwing small children with their mothers into burning buildings. At least 20 children were murdered that day at the Orthodox Orphanage at 149 Wolska Street, though some sources suggest as many as 100 victims. Accounts exist of a Belgian Sturmpioneer attached to the SS-Sonderregiment Dirlewanger smashing the orphans' heads with rifle butts to save ammunition.

In the second half of the day, the massacre became more systematic. Residents of the district were gathered and taken to selected execution sites along Wolska and Górczewska streets. These locations often included large buildings and factory yards, parks, cemeteries, church grounds, or spacious courtyards of larger tenement houses. Groups of men, women, and children were brought to these places and systematically executed, usually with shots to the back of the head or by machine gun fire. Victims were sometimes forced to climb atop piles of bodies of those who had been murdered before them. Witnesses recalled that these heaps of corpses could reach between 25 and 35 meters in length, between 15 and 20 meters in width, and 2 meters in height.

The scale of the massacre caused nervous breakdowns among some German soldiers who witnessed it. However, artillery lieutenant Hans Thieme (later rector of the University of Freiburg) recalled different reactions. He testified after the war that some soldiers actively sought opportunities to participate in the executions and even took commemorative photographs during them.

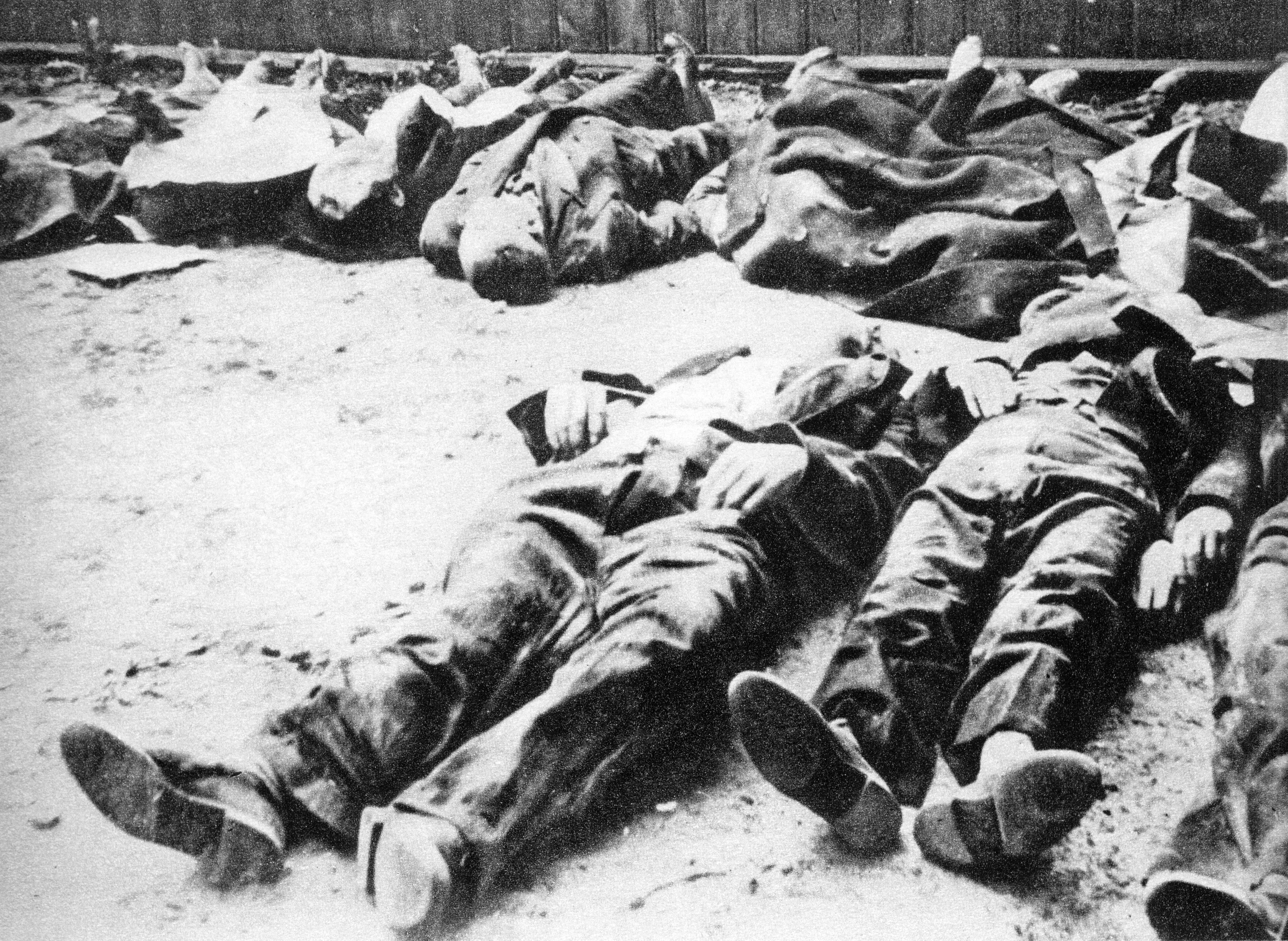
Polish civilians murdered during the Wola massacre in Warsaw, August 1944

Shortly after their advance toward the centre of Warsaw began, the two lead battle groups – Kampfgruppe "Rohr" (led by Generalmajor Günter Rohr) and Kampfgruppe "Reinefarth" (led by Heinz Reinefarth) – were halted by heavy fire from Polish resistance fighters. Unable to proceed forward, some of the German troops began to go from house to house carrying out their orders to shoot all inhabitants. Many civilians were shot on the spot but some were killed after torture and sexual assault. Estimates vary, but Reinefarth himself has estimated that up to 10,000 civilians were killed in the Wola district on 5 August alone, the first day of the operation.

In reality, the number of victims on "Black Saturday" was likely even higher. Władysław Bartoszewski estimated that on 5 August 1944, more than 20,000 Poles were murdered in Wola. According to Antoni Przygoński, the death toll from the massacre on that day reached 45,500. However, other researchers suggest that the figure could not have exceeded 15,000. The majority of these atrocities were committed by troops under the command of SS-Sturmbannführer Kurt Weisse (Adjutant and acting commander of SS-Sonderregiment Dirlewanger until 8 August) and element of Posen Police Group under the command of SS-Gruppenführer Heinz Reinefarth. Research historian Martin Gilbert, from the University of Oxford, wrote:

More than fifteen thousand Polish civilians had been murdered by German troops in Warsaw. At 5:30 that evening [August 5], General Erich von dem Bach gave the order for the execution of women and children to stop. But the killing continued of all Polish men who were captured, without anyone bothering to find out whether they were insurrectionists or not. Nor did either the Cossacks or the criminals in the Kaminsky and Dirlewanger brigades pay any attention to von dem Bach Zelewski's order: by rape, murder, torture and fire, they made their way through the suburbs of Wola and Ochota, killing in three days of slaughter a further thirty thousand civilians, including hundreds of patients in each of the hospitals in their path.

=== Annihilation of Wola hospitals ===
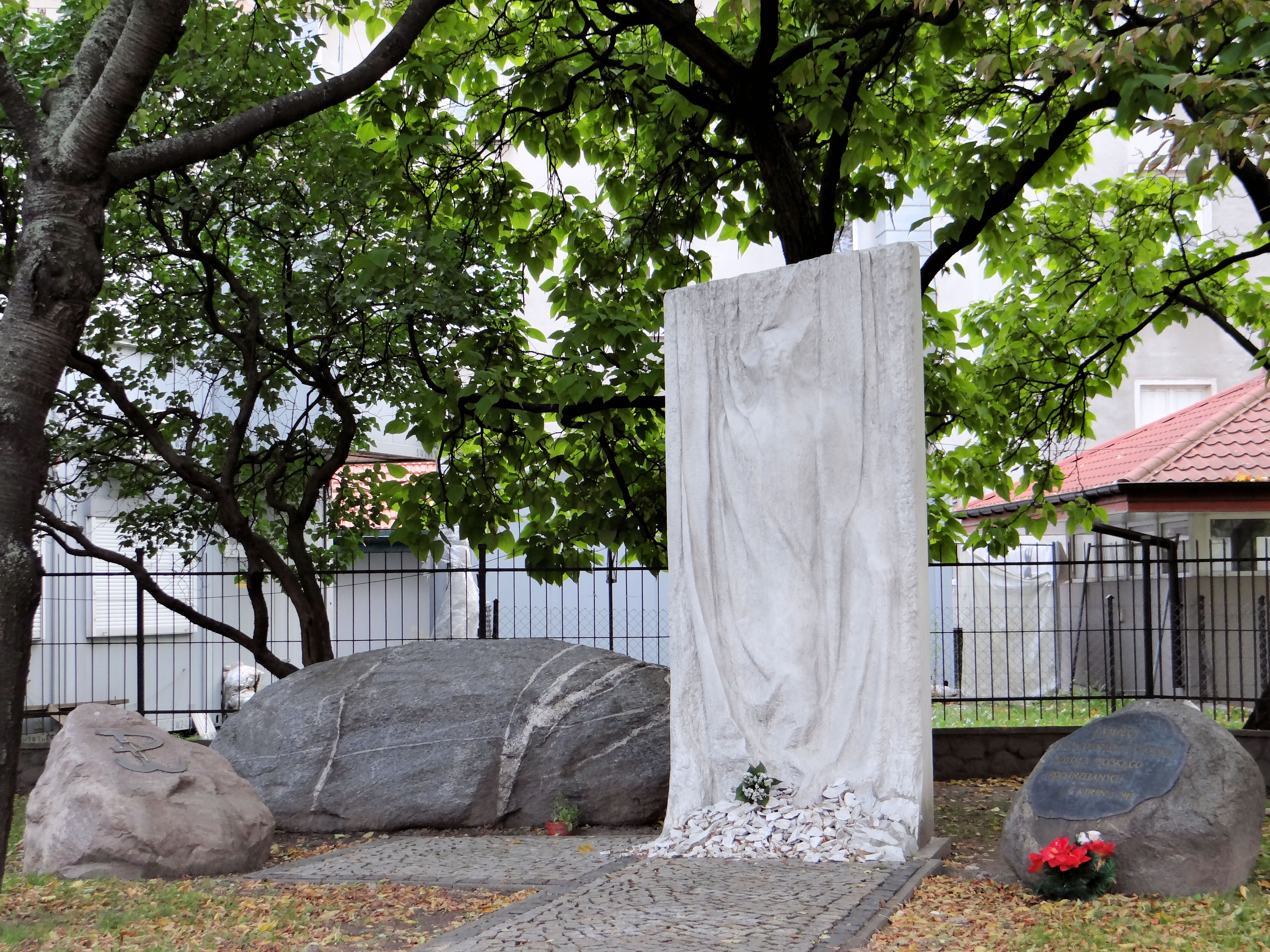
Monument commemorating victims of the Wola Hospital liquidation

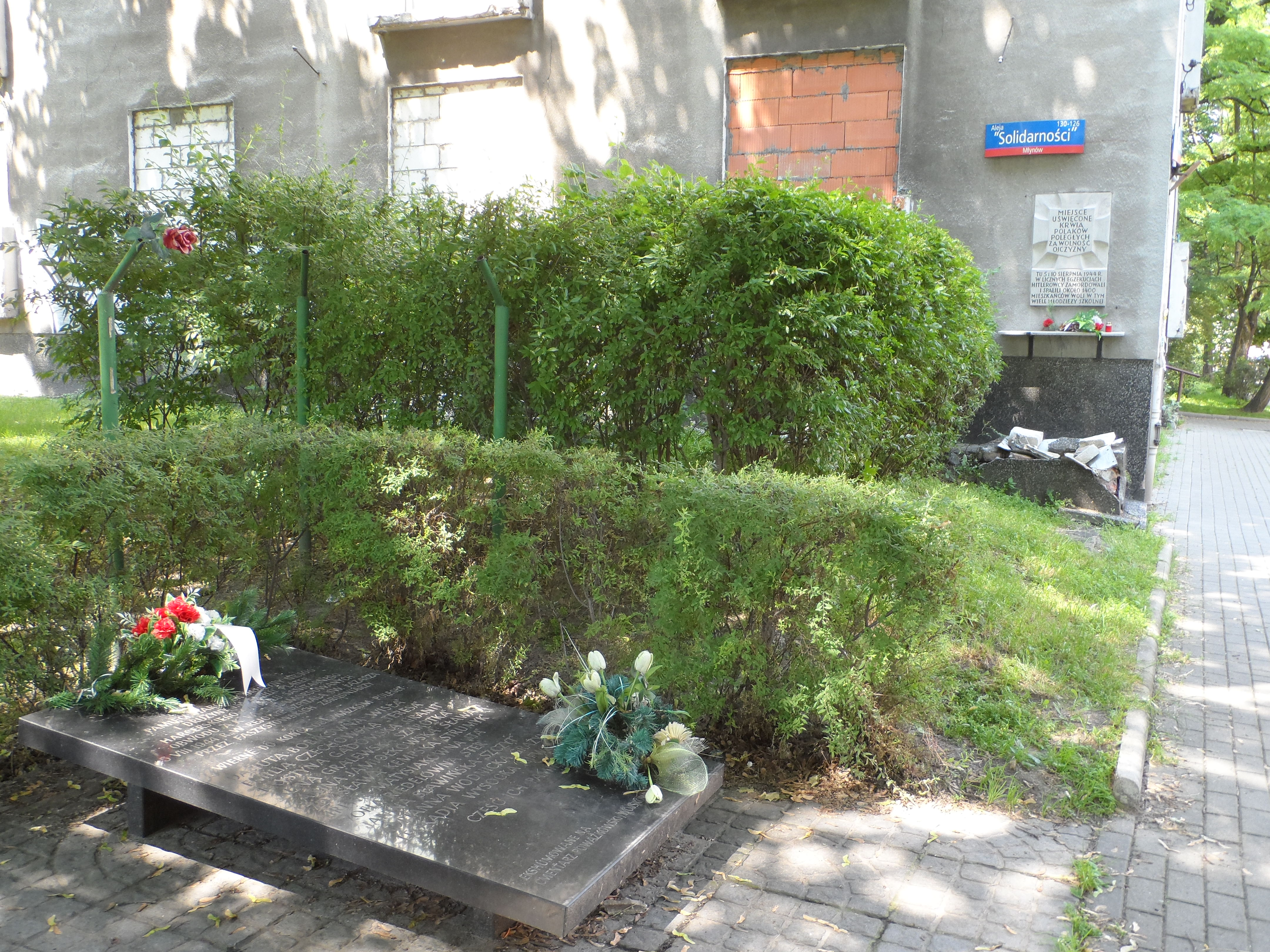
Plaques commemorating victims of the massacre at St. Lazarus Hospital

On 5 August 1944, the slaughter claimed the lives of patients and staff of Wola's hospitals. In the early afternoon, German soldiers entered the Wola Hospital on 26 Płocka Street. The hospital's director, Dr. Józef Marian Piasecki, along with pediatrician Prof. Janusz Zeyland and hospital chaplain Father Kazimierz Ciecierski, were taken to the director's office and executed with gunshots to the head. The Germans also shot several wounded patients lying in the hospital basement. Hundreds of patients and most of the staff were marched out, formed into a column, and escorted to the railway workshops on Moczydło Street. Nearly all men brought from the Wola Hospital were executed later that day near a nearby railway viaduct. The liquidation of Wola Hospital resulted in over 360 victims, including 60 hospital staff (six doctors among them) and 300 patients.

Meanwhile, several staff members, led by Dr. Zbigniew Woźniewski, remained in the Wola Hospital along with some patients unable to move on their own or undiscovered by the Germans. Due to unclear reasons – possibly the intervention of a patient's husband with connections in the Warsaw Gestapo – the hospital was not set ablaze, and the group was spared. Soon, Wola Hospital resumed operations as a first aid point for Polish civilians expelled from Warsaw.

Two hours before midnight on August 5 the Azerbaijani soldiers and Bergmann Battalion attacked St. Lazarus Hospital, executed hundreds of patients, doctors, and nurses, before burning it down. Some victims perished in the flames. Reports also indicate cases of rape during the hospital's liquidation. Approximately 1,200 people died in the massacre at St. Lazarus Hospital, including 11 paramedics from the Wola Subdistrict (10 of whom were teenage scouts from the Emilia Plater unit), at least 7 Benedictine sisters serving in the hospital, and about 40 wounded Home Army soldiers.

The only hospital that avoided a massacre on "Black Saturday" was the St. Stanislaus Infectious Diseases Hospital on 37 Wolska Street. Captured by Germans in the early afternoon, German soldiers shot the porter upon entering the hospital grounds. Patients and staff were then forced into the hospital courtyard amid looting, beating, and terrorizing the ill. At one point, SS soldiers fired randomly into the crowd, killing up to a dozen people and wounding many others. The assembled Poles were arranged into groups of four and led out to Wolska Street, where SS soldiers executed several individuals just beyond the gate. At this critical moment, the hospital's director, Dr. Paweł Kubica, intervened with the SS officer in charge. His flawless German and confident demeanor impressed the SS officer enough to halt the execution. Soon after, a delegation led by Dr. Joanna Kryńska, fluent in German, successfully obtained permission from Reinefarth's staff to spare the hospital. The building was soon repurposed as a German dressing station and Dirlewanger's headquarters. However, isolated executions occurred at the hospital in the following days.

=== Arrival of Erich von dem Bach ===
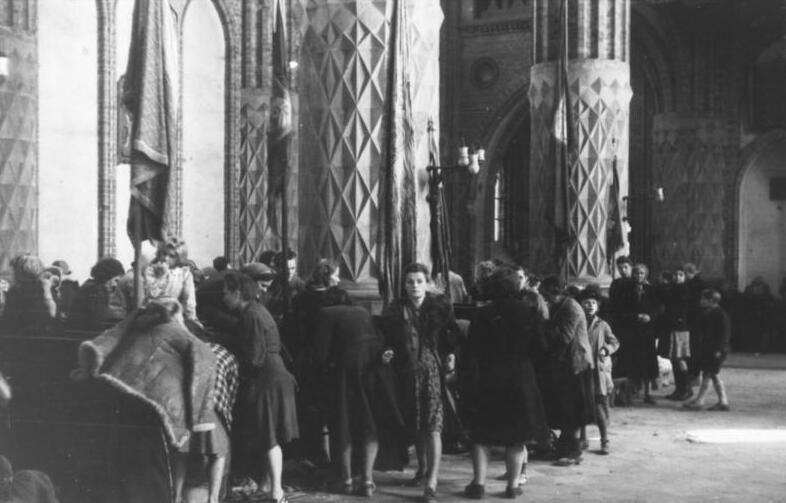
Civilians of Wola gathered in St. Wojciech Church

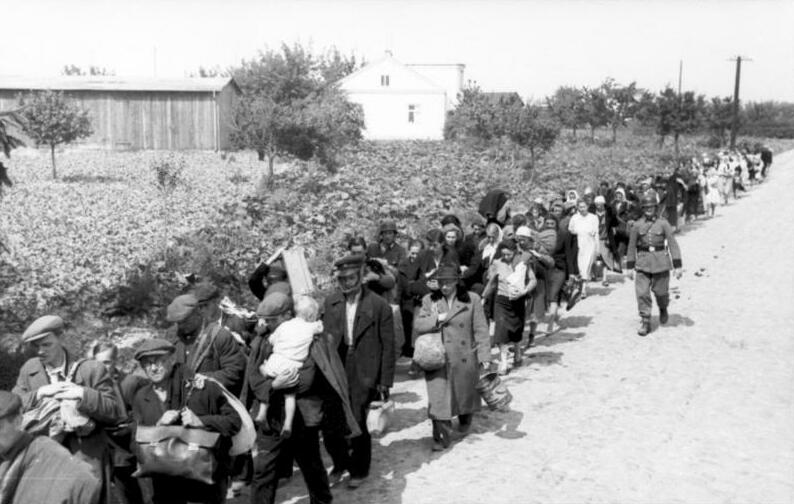
Deportees forced on foot to the Dulag 121 camp in Pruszków

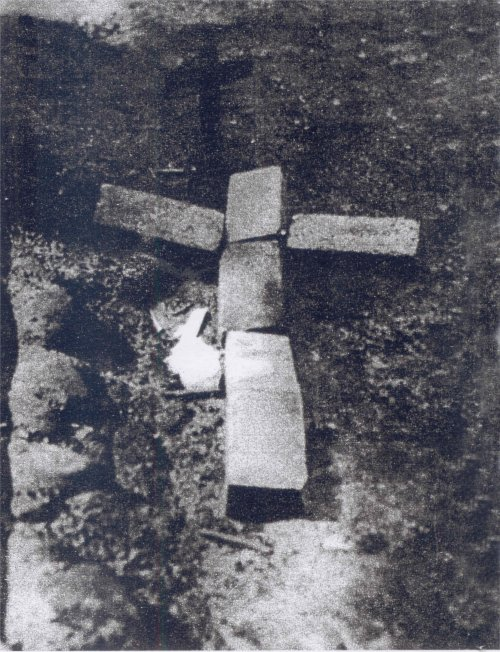
Ashes of 4,000 Wola massacre victims murdered at the Franaszek factory buried in a hole in the ground and commemorated by provisional cross

On the afternoon of August 5, SS-Obergruppenführer Erich von dem Bach-Zelewski arrived at Reinefarth's command post from Sopot, taking command of the forces assigned to suppress the uprising. During the evening briefing, von dem Bach noted the "great confusion and lack of order" among the German troops. That same evening, he moderated Hitler's extermination order – likely with the knowledge and approval of German leaders – prohibiting the murder of women and children while maintaining the order to kill all Polish men and captured insurgents. Under von dem Bach's directive, Polish women and children were to be sent to a transit camp established on August 6 in the defunct Railway Rolling Stock Repair Shops in Pruszków (Dulag 121).

Von dem Bach wrote in his diary that day: "I saved the lives of thousands of women and children, even though they were Poles". In reality, his actions were driven less by humanitarian motives than by pragmatic considerations. He quickly realized that mass killings only strengthened Polish resistance and that soldiers preoccupied with murder, rape, and looting were incapable of conducting effective offensive operations against the insurgents. From the outset, von dem Bach intended to suppress the uprising through a combination of political and military measures, fearing that purely forceful methods would prevent him from achieving his primary goal: the swift elimination of a dangerous flashpoint behind the Eastern Front posed by the uprising in Warsaw.

As part of the plans to deport Warsaw's population, the neo-Gothic St. Stanislaus Bishop Church (commonly referred to at the time as St. Wojciech Church) at 76 Wolska Street was repurposed as an assembly point for Polish civilians awaiting transport to the transit camp in Pruszków. According to German records, approximately 90,000 deportees passed through the church between August 6 and 10. Conditions in the church were horrific, with extreme overcrowding, a lack of water, food, and medical assistance for the wounded and sick. The deportees were forced to relieve themselves inside the church. The imprisoned Poles were treated with brutal violence, including beatings, harassment, and theft. Young women and girls were abducted from the church and raped. In the first weeks of the uprising, at least 400 men were executed near the church after being pulled from the crowd of refugees. Some detained men were also used as "human shields" during German tank assaults. During the massacre in Wola, three priests serving in the church lost their lives.

== Massacre on August 6 ==
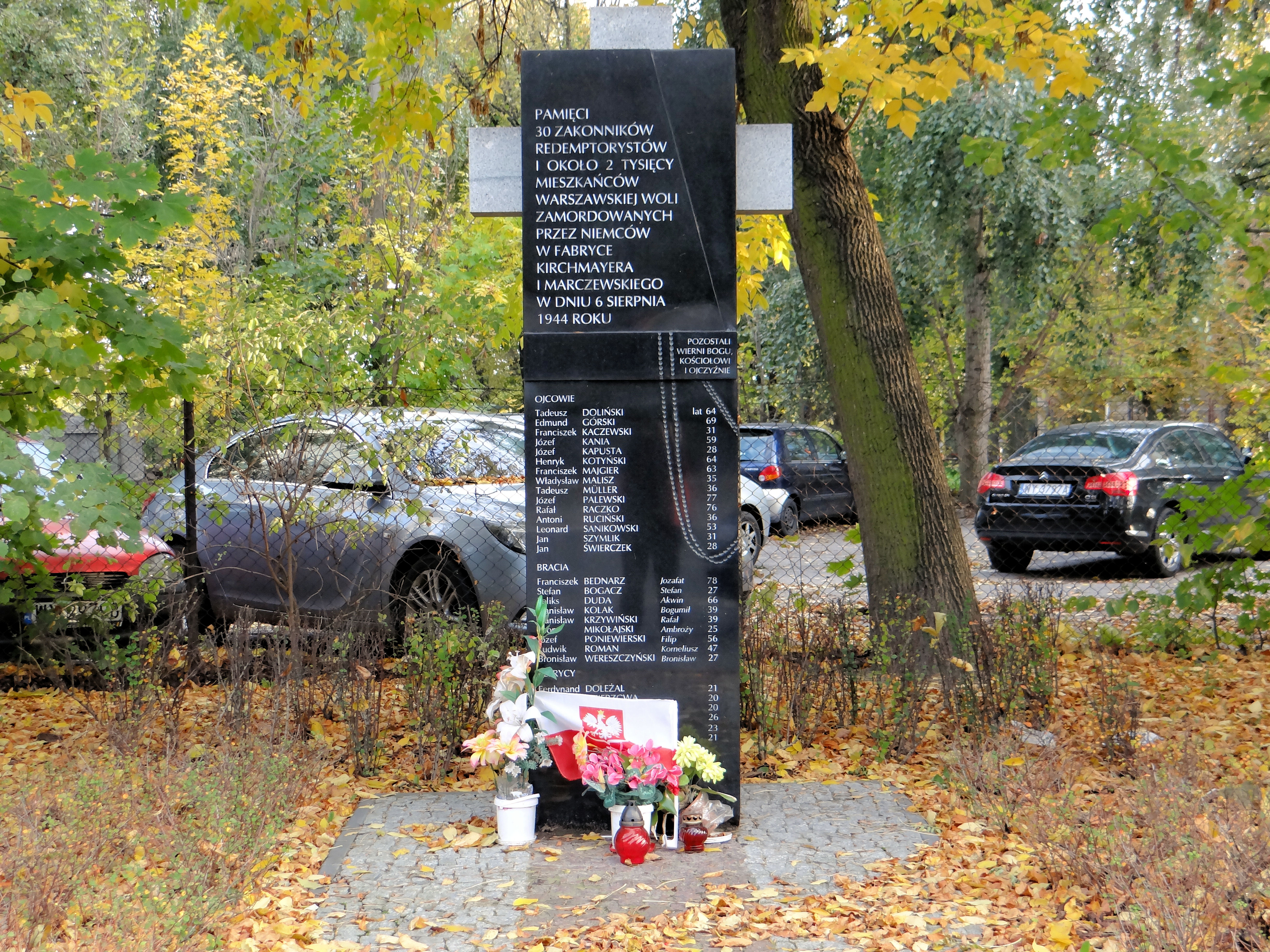
Monument commemorating victims executed in the Kirchmayer and Marczewski Agricultural Machinery Depot

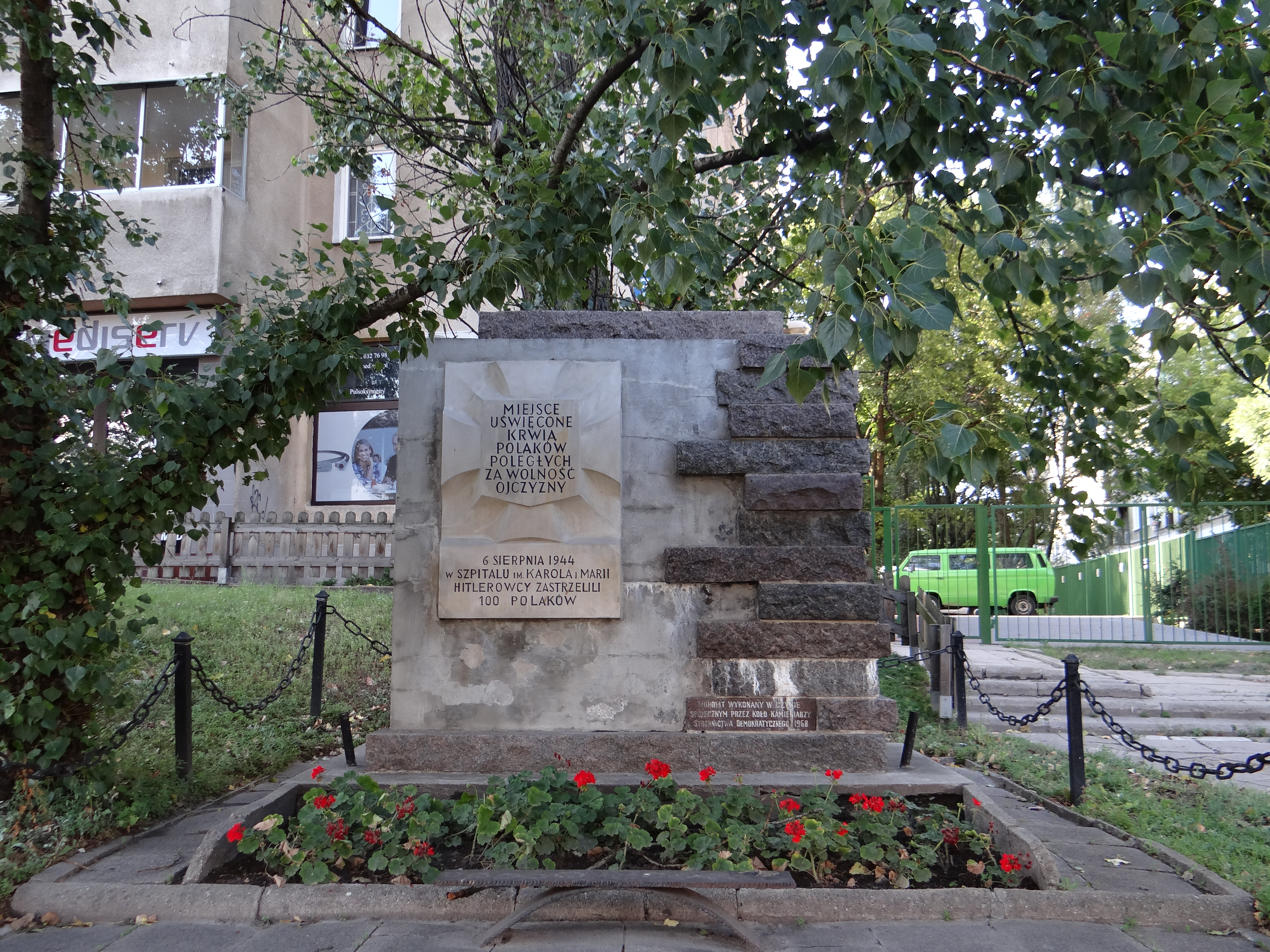
Plaque honoring victims of the massacre at the Karol and Maria Hospital

On the night of August 5 to 6, German forces received significant reinforcements. The following day, Reinefarth's units, together with the 608th Security Regiment, engaged the Radosław Group in fierce combat near the Wola cemeteries. Meanwhile, Dirlewanger's regiment continued its assault toward the "government district", advancing along Chłodna, Ogrodowa, and Krochmalna streets. By the end of the fighting on August 6, the Germans had pushed Polish defenders back beyond Żelazna Street, with Dirlewanger's leading battalion breaking through to the Saxon Garden. Despite this, the Germans were still unable to fully secure the Wola artery, as Polish defenders held positions near the Wola cemeteries, the courthouse buildings on Leszno Street, and the segment of Chłodna Street between Żelazna Street and the Iron Gate Square, which remained a "no-man's-land".

Under von dem Bach's orders, German soldiers were to spare women and children, while continuing to execute captured insurgents and Polish male civilians. However, not all frontline units immediately complied with the new directives. Historian Antoni Przygoński suggested that von dem Bach's subordinates may have only acknowledged Hitler's original order's revocation after receiving written instructions. As a result, the massacre in Wola persisted. Przygoński estimated that approximately 10,000 Poles were murdered in Wola on August 6 alone. Among the victims were residents of buildings seized that day on Chłodna, Leszno, Towarowa, and Żelazna streets. Mass executions of civilians also continued in areas of Wola previously captured by the Germans, accompanied by widespread rape, looting, and arson. Women and children who were spared were forced to march through burning streets to St. Wojciech Church.

On August 6, the Kirchmayer and Marczewski agricultural machinery depot (79/81 Wolska Street) became the main execution site. Approximately 2,000 Wola residents were likely executed there that day. The victims included residents of Krochmalna, Płocka, and Towarowa streets, as well as about 50 Greek, Hungarian, and Romanian Jews from the Warsaw concentration camp on Gęsia Street, who had been freed a day earlier by Home Army soldiers. On the night of August 5 to 6, over 20 monks from the Redemptorist monastery at 49 Karolkowa Street were also murdered in the depot. In total, 30 Redemptorists from the Karolkowa monastery perished during the Wola massacre, including 15 priests, 9 brothers, 5 seminarians, and 1 novice.

On August 6, German forces conducted mass executions in various locations across Wola, including the Franaszek factory, areas near St. Lawrence Church, and the vicinity of the Redemptorist monastery on Karolkowa Street. Near the Wola Hospital, hundreds of captured insurgents and individuals accused of being insurgents were executed, including many children and adolescents aged 12 to 16. Around 3:00 PM or 4:00 PM, German soldiers, accompanied by a battalion of Azerbaijani troops, stormed the Karol and Maria Hospital at 136 Leszno Street. The hospital was set ablaze, and between 100 and 200 seriously wounded and sick patients were murdered. Among the victims were at least 20 children and several wounded Home Army soldiers. The destruction of the hospital was accompanied by looting and the rape of women. Medical staff, lightly wounded patients, and children under the care of nurses were transferred to the Wola Hospital. On the way, the Germans executed the hospital's chief surgeon, Dr. Włodzimierz Kmicikiewicz.

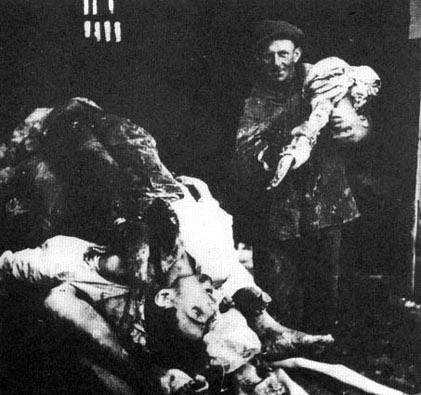
Burning of corpses by the Verbrennungskommando

Wola was strewn with tens of thousands of corpses. To prevent an epidemic and erase evidence of the massacre, between 6 and 23 August the SS formed groups of men from the Wola district into the so-called Verbrennungskommando ("burning detachment"), who were forced to hide evidence of the massacre by burning the victims' bodies and homes. This unit comprised about 100 young and strong Polish men, selected from the population being executed in Wola, and forced to collect and burn bodies. The Verbrennungskommando was based in a building on Sokołowska Street and divided into two 50-person groups operating in the Wolska and Górczewska streets areas. As direct witnesses to the atrocities, the unit members were intended to be eliminated once their task was complete. Only a few managed to escape and survive the war, often with the help of bribes or the kindness of guards.

On August 6, the first transport of approximately 5,000 survivors of the Wola massacre was sent from St. Wojciech Church to the transit camp in Pruszków. The survivors were forced to walk nearly 15 kilometers, reaching the camp on the morning of August 7.

The same day, several thousand civilians held in the railway workshops at Moczydło were also marched to Pruszków via Jelonki. Along the way, German soldiers executed young men pulled from the group and killed civilians who were too weak to continue, paused for water, or picked vegetables from nearby gardens. In the evening, a group of Poles detained in St. Lawrence Church was also sent to Pruszków. However, about 40 elderly, injured, and sick individuals were ordered to remain in the church, after which their fate remains unknown.

== Massacre on August 7 ==
On August 7, the German ground forces were strengthened further. To enhance their effectiveness, the Germans began to use civilians as human shields when approaching positions held by the Polish resistance. These tactics combined with their superior numbers and firepower helped them to fight their way to Bankowy Square in the northern part of Warsaw's city centre and cut the Wola district in half. However, the fighting in Wola did not officially end until August 11, when the Radosław Group withdrew from Okopowa Street through the ruins of the ghetto to the Old Town.

On this day, German units carried out numerous massacres of residents in Wola and the western parts of Northern City Centre. Hundreds of men were forced to remove barricades and rubble along the German advance and were used as human shields for tanks. Later that same day, most of these hostages were executed. One of the main execution sites was Mier Halls, where approximately 700 people were shot between August 7 and 8. Executions also continued in areas of Wola that had been captured in the preceding days, including near St. Lawrence Church. Historian Antoni Przygoński estimates that around 3,800 Poles were murdered in Wola on August 7.

The forced displacement of Warsaw residents continued as thousands of people from Wola, Powiśle, and Northern City Centre were driven through burning streets and piles of corpses to St. Wojciech Church. From there, they were sent to the Warszawa Zachodnia station or to Włochy, eventually being deported to the Pruszków transit camp. The deportations were accompanied by mass looting, as well as rapes of women and girls. German soldiers frequently pulled men and boys from the lines of refugees and executed them on the spot. It is believed that one such victim was Father Colonel Tadeusz Jachimowski, codenamed Budwicz, the chief chaplain of the Home Army. The wounded, sick, and infirm who slowed the march or were unable to continue were systematically killed. Eyewitnesses reported that on August 7, German soldiers created a human chain of dozens of Polish men, women, and children, using them as a shield while firing at insurgent positions near Kerceli Square.

== Atrocities committed in the following days of the uprising ==
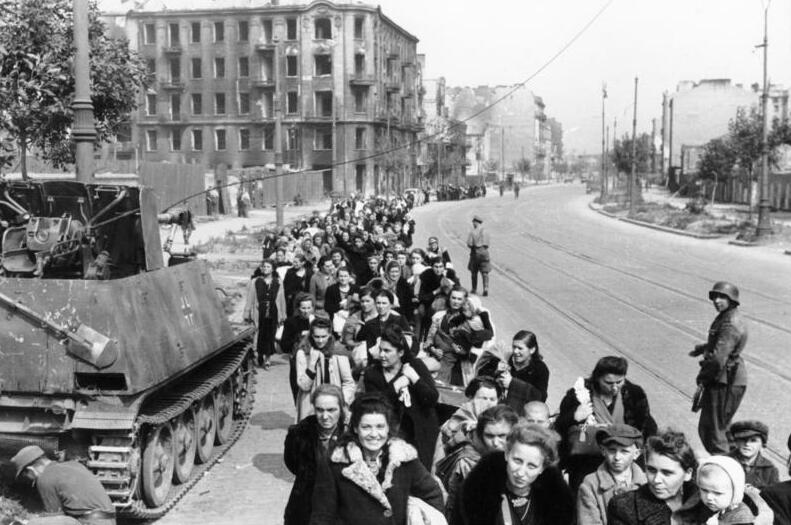
Polish civilians being led along Wolska Street to St. Wojciech Church

Starting from August 8, the pace of the extermination campaign in Wola noticeably slowed. On August 12, Bach further eased Hitler's orders by issuing a prohibition on executing Polish male civilians. In addition to military considerations, economic factors also played a role. At this stage of the war, the Third Reich could not afford to squander such a vast reservoir of potential labor. During post-war interrogations, SS-Oberführer Geibel recounted that in early August 1944, Bach quoted Hitler, saying, "500,000 workers in the Reich equals a battle won".

During the Warsaw Uprising, Wola served as the main route through which German forces evacuated the city's Polish civilian population. Refugees were typically marched through the district to St. Wojciech Church, where they were held briefly before being transported via the Warszawa Zachodnia station to the transit camp in Pruszków. During these marches and stops in Wola, deportees were constantly exposed to violence from German soldiers and their Eastern collaborators. Looting, murders, and rapes of women were widespread. Despite the easing of Hitler's orders, the extermination of insurgents taken prisoner remained in force.

Additionally, from August 8, a special German security police unit began operating alongside the Reinefarth Battle Group. Known as the Einsatzkommando der Sicherheitspolizei bei der Kampfgruppe Reinefarth or Sonderkommando "Spilker", this unit was led by SS-Hauptsturmführer Alfred Spilker. The task of this unit was to conduct selections among the deported population, identifying and eliminating individuals deemed "undesirable". This group included those suspected of participating in the uprising, individuals of Jewish descent, the injured, the sick, the infirm (unable to work or reach the transit camp on their own), as well as certain social groups, particularly members of the intelligentsia and clergy. The selection criteria were so broad and arbitrary that, in practice, anyone could be singled out and executed if they attracted the displeasure of the SS officers.

The Sonderkommando "Spilker" was stationed at the rectory of St. Wojciech Church. Members of the unit conducted the selection of evacuees at various assembly points throughout the city. Executions of "undesirable persons", however, were primarily carried out at the courtyard of the Municipal Fuel Works at 59 Okopowa Street in Wola, located opposite the Pfeiffer Tannery. The Chief Commission for the Prosecution of Crimes against the Polish Nation estimated that over 2,000 people were murdered at this site during the Warsaw Uprising. However, testimonies from Polish and German witnesses suggest that the number of victims of executions near the Pfeiffer Tannery may have reached as many as 5,000. Among the murdered were residents from various districts of Warsaw, primarily Wola, the Old Town, and Northern Śródmieście.

The greatest number of killings took place at the railway embankment on Górczewska Street and two large factories on Wolska Street – the Ursus Factory at 55 Wolska Street and the Franaszka Factory at 41/45 Wolska Street – as well as the Pfeiffer Factory at 57/59 Okopowa Street. At each of these four locations, thousands of people were systematically executed in mass shootings, having been previously rounded up in other places and taken there in groups.

== Reactions of civilians and insurgent authorities ==
The massacres carried out by the Germans were witnessed by soldiers of the Home Army and other armed groups fighting in Wola. They heard the volleys of execution squads, the screams of victims, and observed the expulsion of residents from their homes as well as patients and staff from the Wola Hospital. Some insurgents even saw executions and piles of corpses with their own eyes. On the evening of August 5, an unidentified employee of the Bureau of Information and Propaganda of the Home Army Headquarters, reporting on the atrocities committed by the Germans in Wola, proposed to his superiors that they immediately publicize these events and provoke an international outcry to force the Germans to "temporarily at least restrain their barbarity". Lieutenant Colonel Jan Mazurkiewicz, codenamed Radosław, in a report to Colonel Antoni Chruściel, codenamed Monter, commander of the Warsaw District of the Home Army, dated 3:00 AM on August 6, wrote:

The enemy is burning more houses and executing residents in Wola [...] Thousands of refugees from Wola have gathered in my sector. A massive tragedy is unfolding like the historical massacre of Praga. I am doing what I can to reduce this tragedy, sending people to the Old Town. If you can help, do so quickly, as there is little time left.

The insurgent units in Wola, poorly armed, decimated, and engaged in fierce battles against superior enemy forces, were unable to assist the slaughtered civilians. They could only delay the German advance, giving civilians time to escape to liberated districts of Warsaw.

News of the German atrocities spread rapidly. Residents of quarters in Wola not yet occupied by the enemy began a panicked flight toward the Old Town and the city centre. Refugees, however, received almost no aid from the military and civilian authorities of the Polish Underground State. On the contrary, out of fear of inciting panic, these authorities attempted to limit the influx of refugees and prevent the spread of information about the massacres in Wola. These efforts proved futile, and the news of German atrocities worsened morale among the capital's inhabitants. However, in some cases, survivors' accounts were met with disbelief. Assistance to Wola refugees was primarily provided by the Polish Red Cross, alongside scouts and churches of various denominations.

Many Wola refugees who managed to escape the massacre later perished during the siege of the Old Town. Historians estimate that in August and September 1944, at least 30,000 civilians sheltering in the Old Town died due to air raids, artillery shelling, hunger, thirst, and executions carried out by German soldiers. A significant proportion of these victims were refugees from Wola.

== Aftermath ==
=== Fate of the perpetrators ===
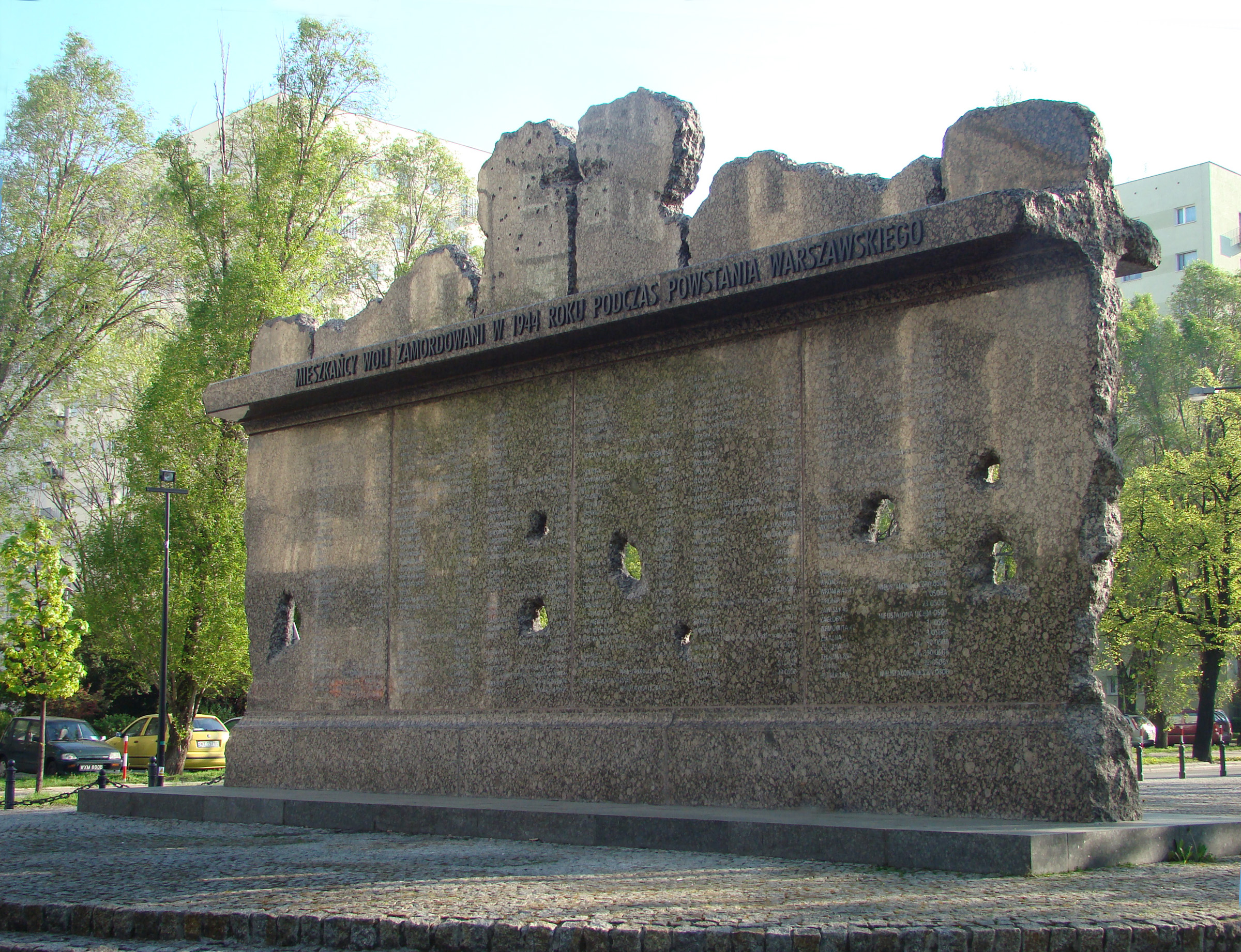
The Monument to Victims of the Wola Massacre, displaying a list of execution sites across Wola and estimates of the number of victims at each site

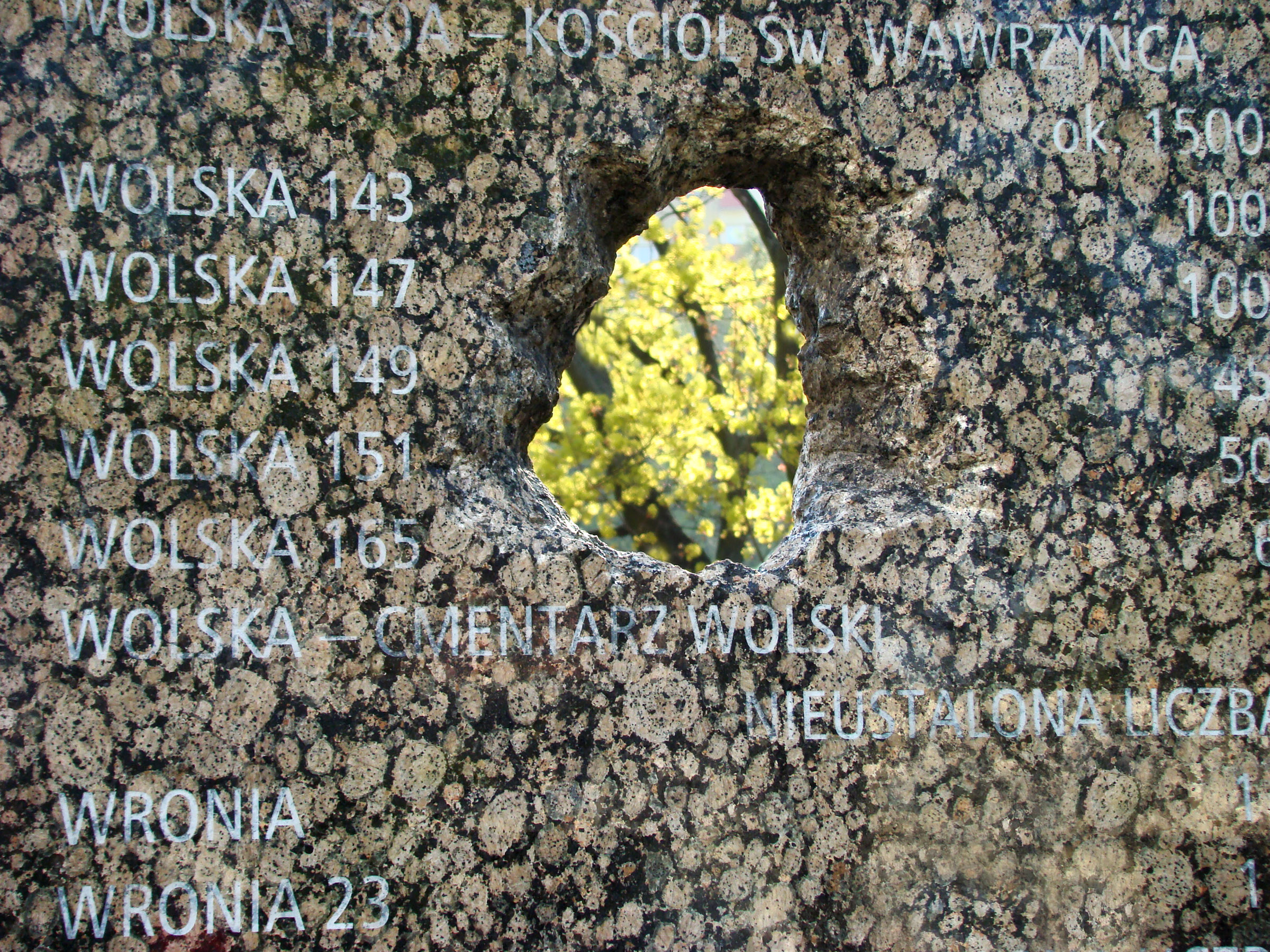
A close-up of a detail of the Monument to Victims of the Wola Massacre listing some of the Wolska Street execution sites

The issue of crimes committed by the Germans during the suppression of the Warsaw Uprising was not thoroughly analyzed during the trial of major Nazi war criminals before the Nuremberg Military Tribunal. Factors such as the limitation of the judicial panel to representatives of the four Allied powers and the main prosecutor, Robert H. Jackson's, focus on prosecuting primarily those responsible for crimes against peace, hindered such an analysis. Additionally, the Soviet side was responsible for preparing the indictment and evidence regarding the crimes committed on the occupied Polish territory, with a focus on highlighting the suffering of Soviet nations. Furthermore, a detailed examination of the suppression of the uprising could have been politically uncomfortable for Moscow.

Telford Taylor, one of the American prosecutors at the Nuremberg Tribunal, initially planned to make the destruction of Warsaw the subject of a separate trial before the Tribunal. The main defendant would have been General Heinz Guderian, with other key figures, such as Erich von dem Bach-Zelewski and Heinz Reinefarth, also facing trial. However, due to budget cuts imposed by the Allied powers, these plans were abandoned. Taylor believed that the lack of a specific trial for the suppression of the Warsaw Uprising would not hinder the prosecution of the perpetrators, as he hoped the Polish authorities would take up the matter. In 1947, however, the Western powers halted the extradition to Poland of individuals suspected of war crimes. As a result, none of the perpetrators of the Wola massacre were held criminally responsible after the war.

A few months after the end of the war, Erich von dem Bach-Zelewski was arrested by the Americans. During the main Nuremberg trial, he made several statements implicating Nazi leaders, which led the US to refuse his extradition to Poland. In February 1947, he briefly appeared in Warsaw as a witness at the trial of Ludwig Fischer, the governor of the Warsaw District. In 1951, a denazification court in Munich sentenced him to 10 years in prison, but half of the sentence was considered served, and the remainder was limited to house arrest. Soon after, von dem Bach settled in the village of Eckersmühlen near Nuremberg and worked as a night watchman. In 1958, he was arrested on suspicion of involvement in the murder of one of the victims of the Night of the Long Knives, and three years later, he was sentenced to 4.5 years in prison. In 1962, von dem Bach was once again brought to trial, this time for the murder of several German communists. He was sentenced to life imprisonment. He died in the Munich-Harlaching prison hospital in March 1972. He was never judged for the crimes committed during the suppression of the Warsaw Uprising.

The main perpetrators of the Wola massacre and similar massacres in the nearby Ochota district were Heinz Reinefarth and Oskar Dirlewanger. Dirlewanger, who presided over and personally participated in many of the worst acts of violence, was arrested on 1 June 1945 by French occupation troops while hiding under a false name near the town of Altshausen in Upper Swabia. He died on 7 June 1945 in a French prison camp at Altshausen, probably as a result of ill-treatment by his Polish guards. In 1945, Reinefarth was taken into custody by the Allied authorities but was never prosecuted for his actions in Warsaw, despite Polish requests for his extradition. After a West German court released him citing a lack of evidence, Reinefarth enjoyed a successful post-war career as a lawyer, becoming the mayor of Westerland, and a member of the Landtag parliament of Schleswig-Holstein. The West German government also gave the former SS-Obergruppenführer a general's pension before he died in 1979.

In May 2008, a list of several former SS Dirlewanger members who were still alive was compiled and published by the Warsaw Uprising Museum.

The fate of SS-Hauptsturmführer Alfred Spilker remains unknown. According to some sources, he died in February 1945 while defending the Poznań Citadel or in Krems an der Donau, Austria. In 1961, a court in Kiel officially declared him dead.

=== Role of the SS-Sonderregiment Dirlewanger and eastern collaborators ===
The role of the SS-Sonderregiment Dirlewanger and eastern collaborators in the atrocities committed during the suppression of the Warsaw Uprising remains a point of historical contention. After the war, General Heinz Guderian argued that the responsibility for the crimes committed during the suppression should be placed solely on the "doubtful elements", such as undisciplined collaborationist units and criminals from the SS-Sonderregiment Dirlewanger. Heinz Reinefarth, seeking to absolve himself, consistently promoted the narrative that the unit operated independently and played a central role in the massacres of the civilian population of Wola. This idea was also echoed by some Western historians, including Hanns von Krannhals, author of the only German monograph on the Warsaw Uprising, who suggested that the massacre of Wola (limited by him to 5 August 1944) was carried out by "special groups of police officers" whose sole purpose was the murder of civilians.

However, these claims do not align with the available evidence. Numerous testimonies from survivors of the massacre indicate that the primary role in the extermination of Wola's population was played by Ordnungspolizei units from Wartheland, composed of the Reichsdeutsche (Germans and Austrians) and Volksdeutsche – often older reservists who were unable to serve on the front lines. Antoni Przygoński further argues that there is no evidence to suggest that German "relief forces" were divided between those fighting insurgents and those conducting executions. He points out that Sonderkommando "Spilker", operating within Reinefarth's group, was only formed on 8 August 1944.

German prosecutors investigating the war crimes committed during the suppression of the Warsaw Uprising concluded that the SS-Sonderregiment Dirlewanger could only be held exclusively responsible for 16 of the 41 mass executions carried out in the Wolkastrasse area (most likely referring to Wolska Street). The Dirlewanger men are known to have executed prisoners and civilians in buildings they had captured, and it is possible that they participated in other mass executions that took place behind the front lines. Hubert Kuberski suggests, however, that due to the small size of Meyer's battalion (365 men) and its primary objective of fighting insurgents and securing Wola's arteries, the Dirlewanger Regiment could not have played a pivotal role in the extermination of Wola's inhabitants.

Piotr Gursztyn argues that placing the blame entirely on the SS-Sonderregiment Dirlewanger serves to portray the mass extermination of thousands of women and children as an unfortunate incident, rather than a planned and eagerly executed operation. Furthermore, there are no known instances of protests from the 9th Army or other Wehrmacht authorities against the crimes committed by the SS-Sonderregiment Dirlewanger or other SS formations during the suppression of the Warsaw Uprising.

== Victims ==
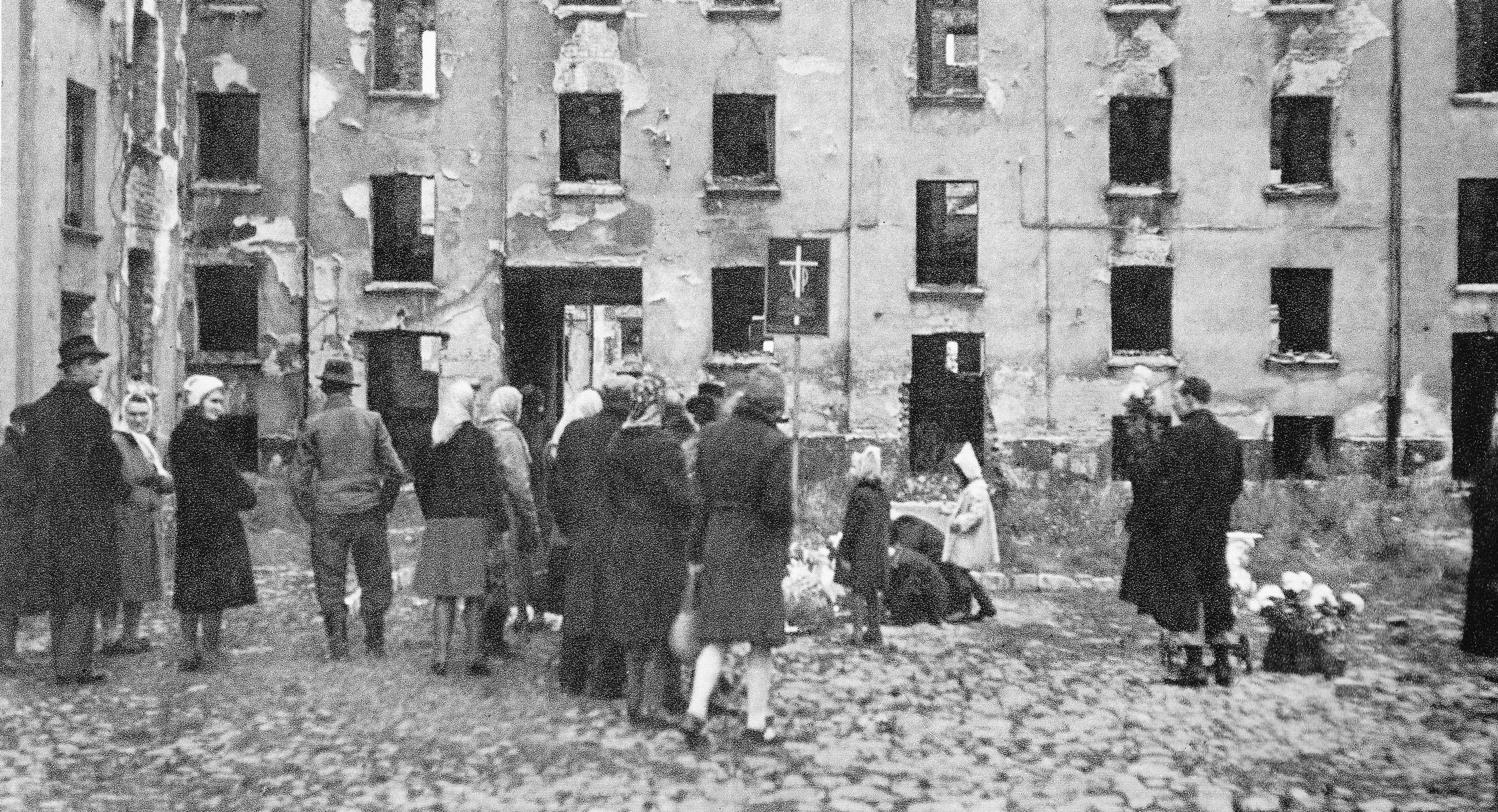
Warsaw residents gathered at one of the massacre sites, 1 November 1945

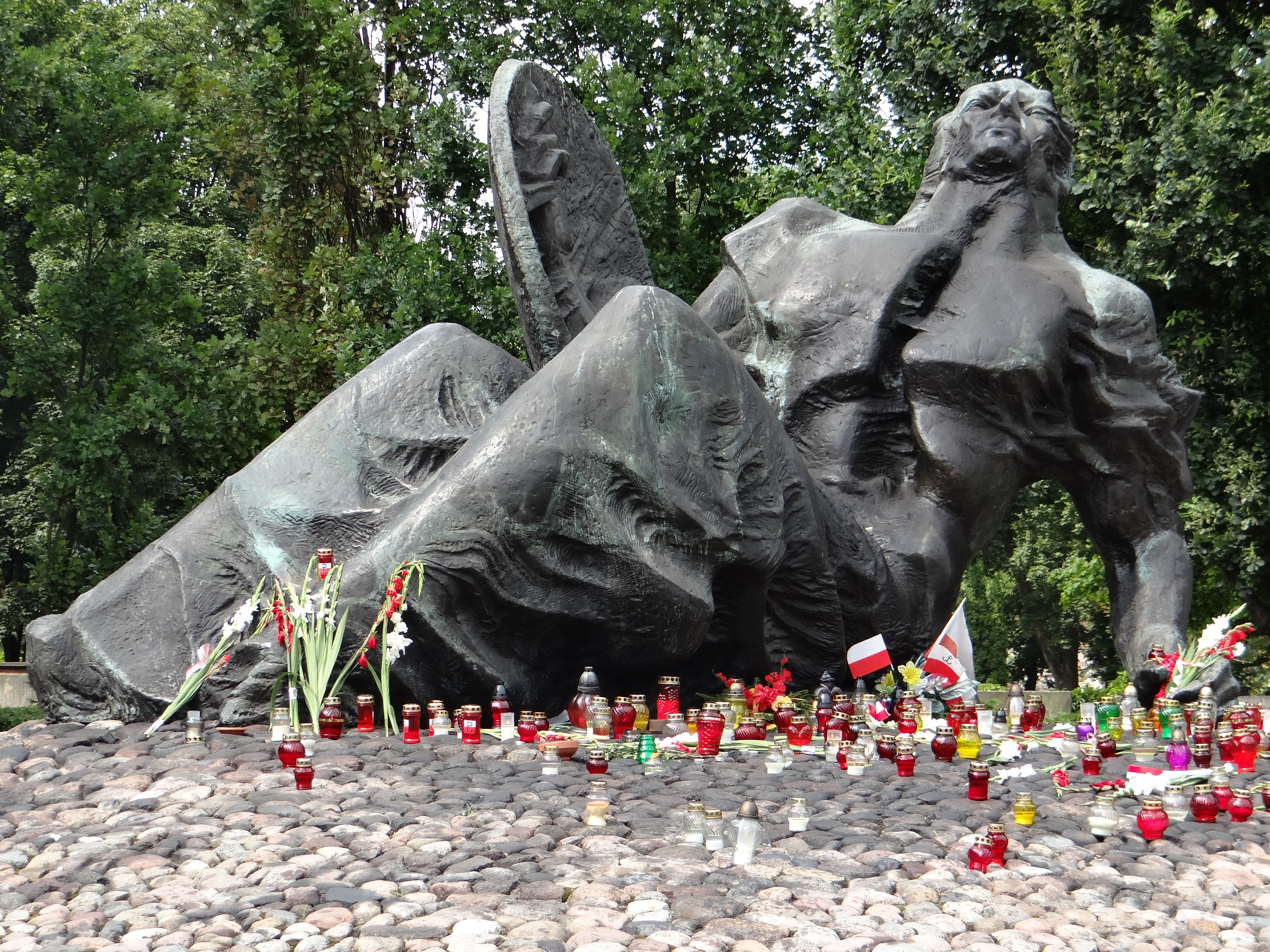
"Fallen Unconquered" monument at the Warsaw Insurgents Cemetery, beneath which lies up to 12 tons of human ashes collected from execution sites in Wola

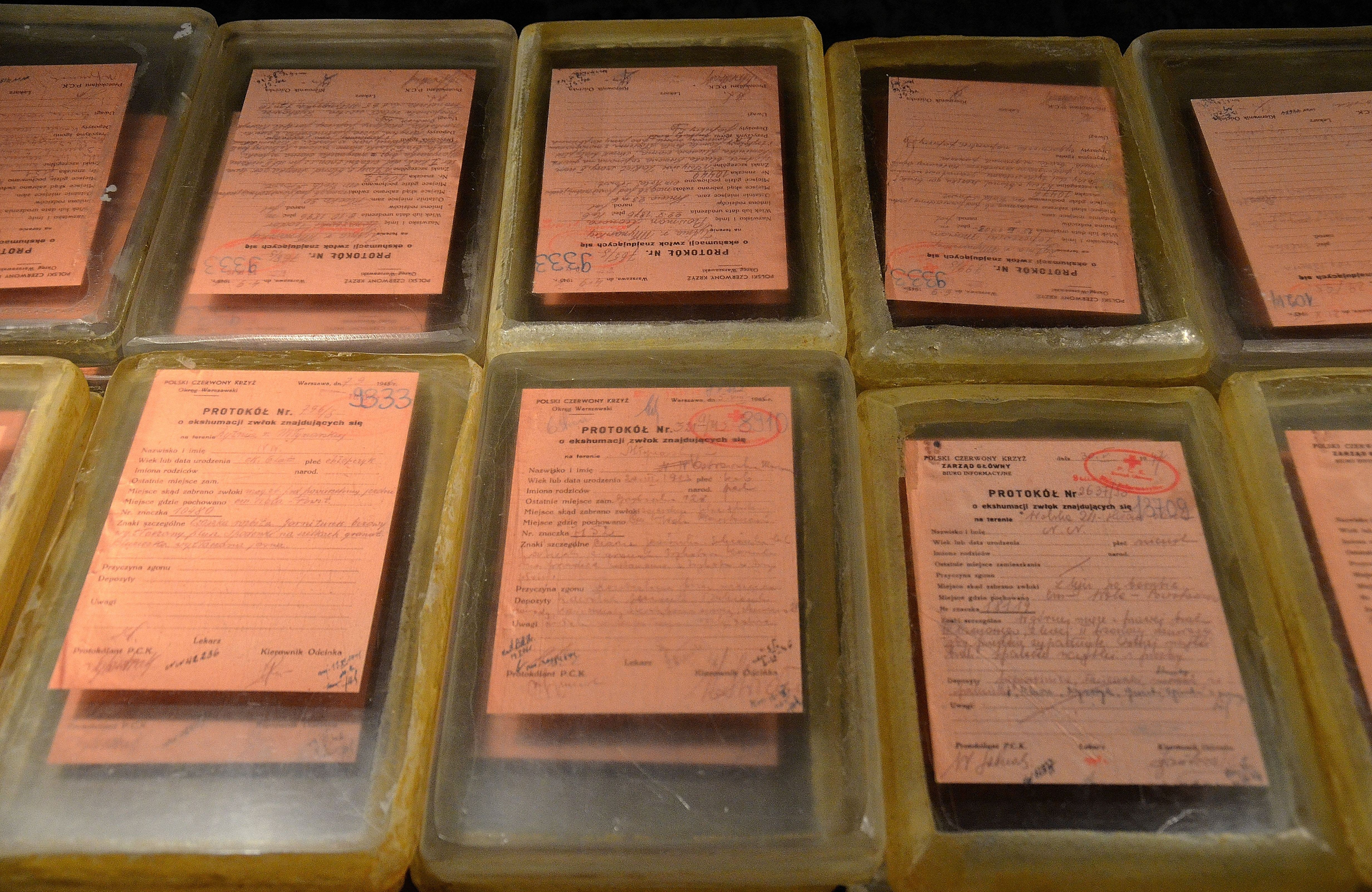
Protocols from the Polish Red Cross documenting exhumations of victims from the Wola Massacre. Warsaw Rising Museum archives

The extermination of Wola's population by the units under Reinefarth and Dirlewanger was a direct consequence of and compliance with Hitler's and Himmler's orders to destroy Warsaw and annihilate all its inhabitants. Historian Szymon Datner described the Wola massacre as "one of the bloodiest chapters in the martyrology of the Polish nation". Norman Davies referred to 5 and 6 August 1944 as "the two darkest days in Warsaw's history". Wanda Jarząbek considered the massacre one of the largest single atrocities against civilians during the German occupation. Similarly, Piotr Gursztyn argued it was likely the largest single massacre of civilians in Europe during World War II and possibly the largest single atrocity against the Polish nation in history.

Establishing the exact number of victims of the Wola massacre is impossible due to the Germans' burning of most bodies and the limited number of surviving witnesses who could identify the murdered (entire families perished during the massacre). Antoni Przygoński was the first to attempt an estimate. In his 1980 work, he calculated that over 65,000 Poles were murdered during the Wola massacre, with 59,400 killed between August 5 and 7. Przygoński's calculations relied on earlier research by Stanisław Płoski and Ewa Śliwińska, as well as prewar and postwar population censuses, which indicated that Wola's population decreased from 84,424 in January 1938 to 19,964 in May 1945, which was a loss of over 64,000.

Other sources estimate the death toll at approximately 50,000. Adam Borkiewicz, Władysław Bartoszewski, and Krzysztof Dunin-Wąsowicz estimated around 38,000 Poles were murdered in Wola in August 1944. Joanna K.M. Hanson and Alexandra Richie placed the number at between 30,000 and 40,000. General Tadeusz Komorowski, codenamed Bór, estimated 30,000, while Maria Turlejska, Marek Getter, and Andrzej Janowski suggested at least 20,000. Conversely, West German historian Hans von Krannhals claimed only between 10,000 and 15,000 Polish civilians were killed in Wola, a figure also supported by Polish researcher Marek Strok, as introduced into academic discourse by Hubert Kuberski.

Due to arson and demolitions by German units, 81% of Wola's residential buildings were destroyed. The district's industry was also devastated and looted. In the 1950s and 1960s, ruins in Wola were intensively demolished to make way for new housing developments. The district's original dense architecture, partly wooden and typically no taller than 2 or 4 stories, was replaced with scattered apartment blocks, often between 7 and 9 stories high or taller. As a result of the mass murder and displacement of Wola's population, wartime destruction, and postwar urban changes, the district's appearance and character were almost entirely transformed. The prewar Wola, with its unique culture and folklore, ceased to exist.

During the Polish People's Republic, the Wola massacre occupied a secondary position in historical memory and policy. Survivors were not entitled to any veteran rights or benefits.

== Legal classification of the crime ==
There is no full agreement among historians and lawyers regarding the legal classification of the crime committed in Wola during the first days of August 1944. Some are inclined to consider the massacre of the civilian population as genocide. Others, including William Schabas and Patrycja Grzebyk, regard it as a war crime and a crime against humanity, but not meeting the criteria for genocide. Grzebyk notes that, while international tribunals' rulings allow for recognizing crimes committed in a small area or a small part of a group (e.g., the Srebrenica massacre) as genocide, a key condition in such cases is that only a small part of the group remains under the perpetrators' control. This condition, however, was not met in the case of the Wola massacre, or more broadly, the suppression of the Warsaw Uprising, as large areas populated by Poles remained under German occupation at the time, where no crimes of such scale occurred.

Wanda Jarząbek emphasizes that the crimes committed during the suppression of the Warsaw Uprising, including the massacre of Wola's population, were "a logical consequence of the German occupation policy on Polish soil – a policy of a genocidal nature". Therefore, she opposes viewing the Wola massacre solely as an act of German revenge for the uprising and is inclined to consider it "one of the acts of genocide according to the 1948 UN Convention".

Piotr Madajczyk argues that the Wola massacre does not meet the criteria for genocide according to Raphael Lemkin's definition, but was part of the genocidal policy pursued by Nazi Germany against the Polish nation.

== Origins of the term "Wola massacre" ==
The term "Wola massacre" was first used in reference to the events of early August 1944 by Zygmunt Wojciechowski and Edward Serwański in their publication Zbrodnia niemiecka w Warszawie 1944 r. (German Crime in Warsaw 1944), published by the Western Institute in 1946. The term referred to the massacre of the Warsaw population in Praga carried out by Russian troops on 4 November 1794, as well as to the Galician massacre. It is also possible that Wojciechowski and Serwański used a term that originated during the uprising itself. In fact, Lieutenant Colonel Radosław in his report of August 6 compared the Wola tragedy to the massacre of Praga.

Over the following years, the term "Wola massacre" became widely used in historiography and public discourse. It was used, for example, by Władysław Bartoszewski in his works on the Warsaw Uprising.

== Commemoration ==
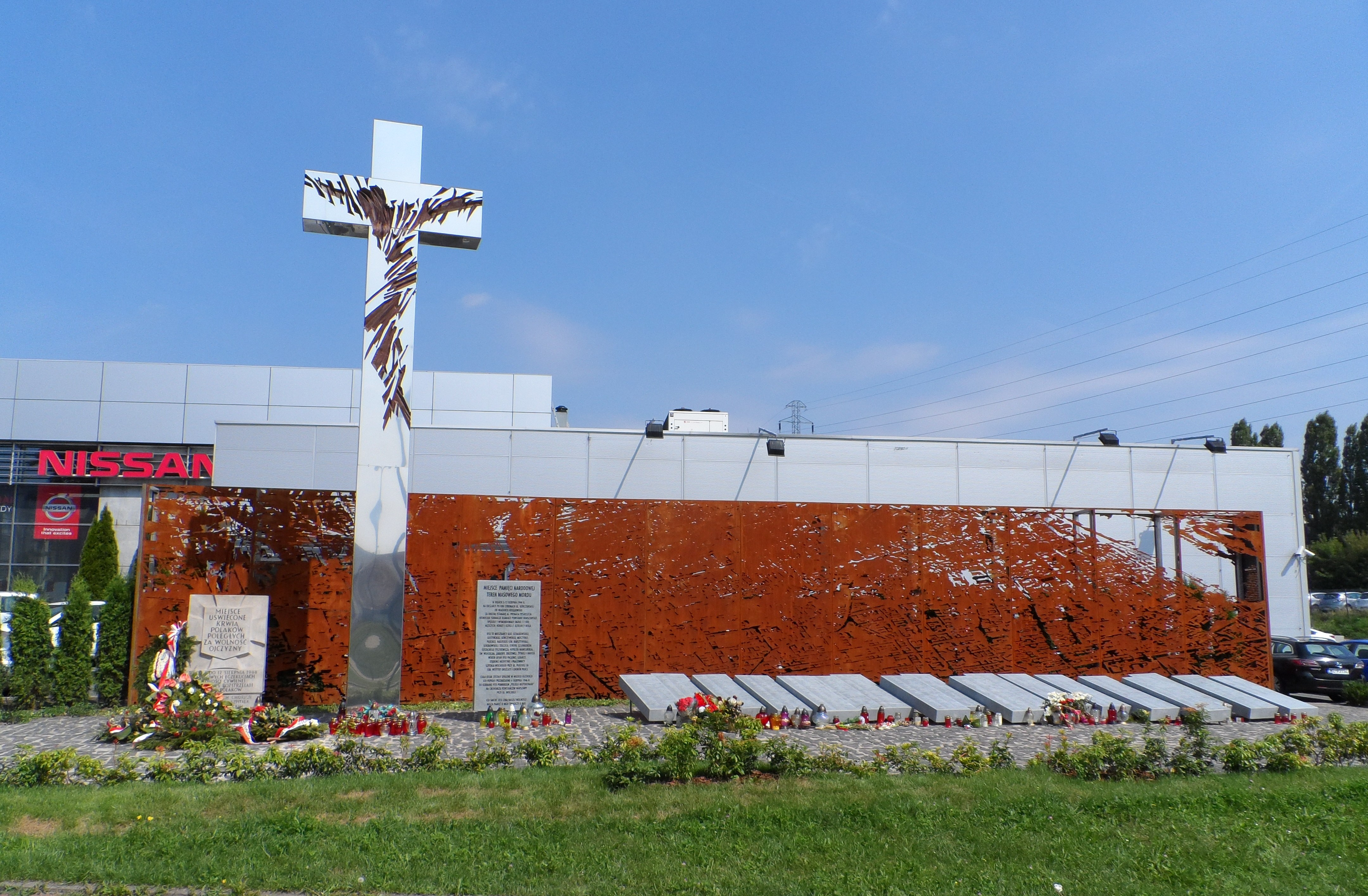
Wola Massacre Memorial

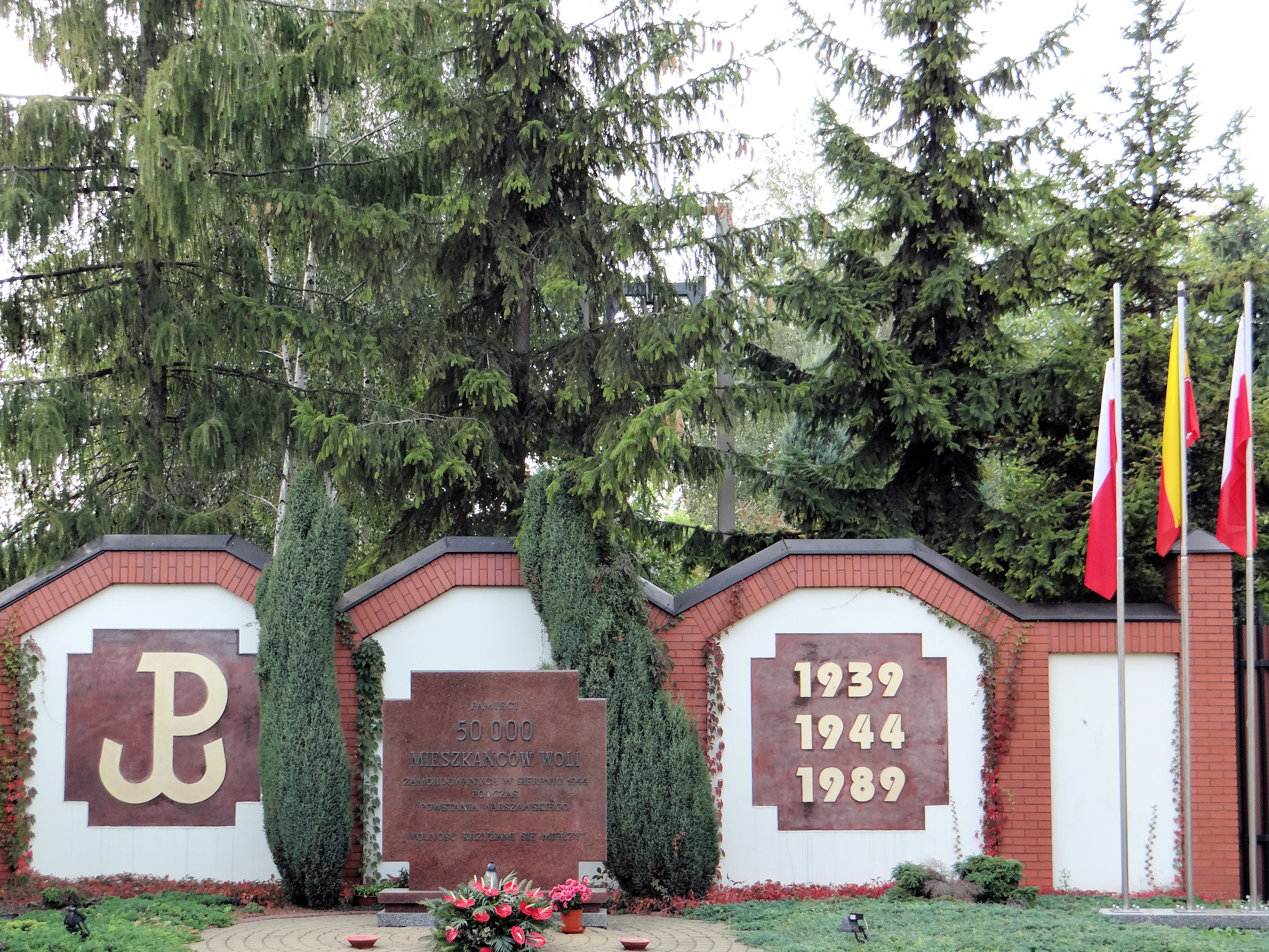
Wola Martyrs Square on Karolkowa Street

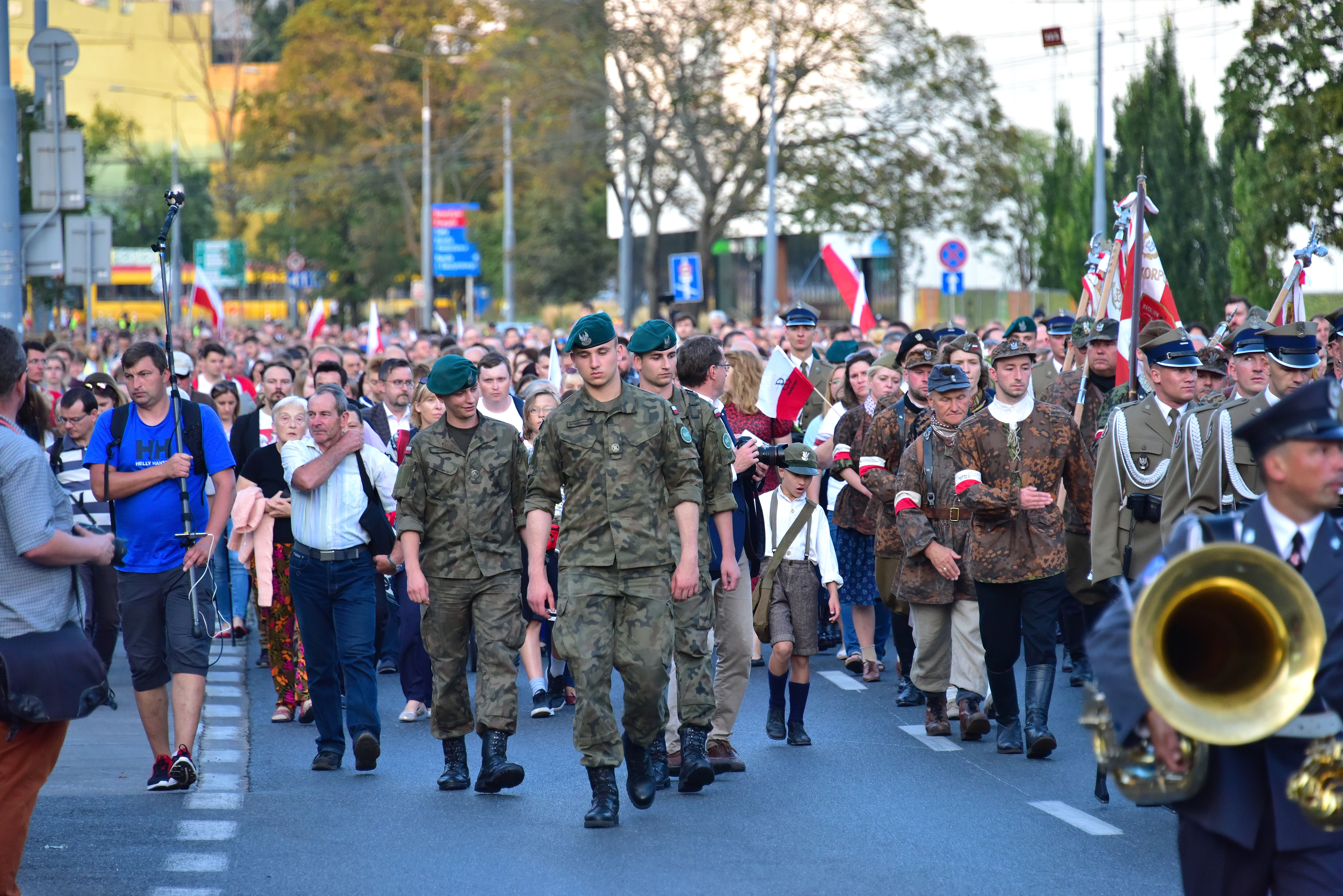
March of Memory of the Civilian Victims of the Warsaw Uprising, commemorating, among others, the victims of the Wola massacre (2019)

After the liberation of the Polish capital, the Red Cross conducted exhumation work in the Wola district. A grand funeral for the remains of the district's residents took place on 6 August 1946. On that day, after a mourning Mass at the Church of the Holiest Saviour in downtown Warsaw, 100 – according to other sources, 115 or 117 – coffins were transported in open cars to Wola and solemnly buried at the Warsaw Insurgents Cemetery. The coffins contained between 8 and 12 tons of human ashes, collected from execution sites on the streets, squares, and courtyards of Wola, as well as from areas around Pawiak, the ruins of the Warsaw Ghetto, the Gestapo headquarters on Szuch Avenue, and the Radium Institute in Ochota. The ceremony was attended by tens of thousands of Warsaw residents.

The remains of Warsaw Uprising victims – mostly anonymous civilians – were buried at the Warsaw Insurgents Cemetery until the early 1950s. Today, beneath the mound on which the "Fallen Unconquered" Monument was erected in 1973, as much as 12 tons of human ashes are buried (equivalent to about 40,000 to 50,000 murdered individuals). The paving stones around the monument were gathered from the streets of Wola. Additionally, the Wola Cemetery became a burial site for victims of the Wola massacre, where symbolic graves of the Redemptorists from the monastery on Karolkowa Street, as well as Benedictine nuns murdered at the St. Lazarus Hospital, can be found, along with a cemetery for Orthodox Christians (where the remains of children from the orphanage and residents of the parish house of the parish of St. John Klimak are buried).

After the war, execution sites in Wola were inventoried and marked, mostly with sandstone plaques designed by Karol Tchorek. For a long time, however, no other actions were taken to commemorate the victims of the massacre. Moreover, during the Polish People's Republic era, many grassroots memorials, especially those containing elements of religious symbolism, were removed. During this period, relative freedom in commemorating the victims of the Wola massacre was enjoyed only by institutions – the Catholic and Orthodox churches, and the staff of the Wola Hospital. At the initiative of the latter, a wooden cross was erected in August 1945 at the execution site on Górczewska Street (it lasted until 2003). In 1949, a small monument in the shape of a tombstone was placed near the Church of St. Lawrence, close to the mass grave containing the remains of massacre victims.

In 2010, the Warsaw City Council established August 5 as the Day of Remembrance for the Residents of Wola.

In August 2012, the Institute of National Remembrance conducted the "Wola Memory 1944" project, aimed at commemorating and recalling the German crimes committed against the people of Warsaw during the suppression of the Warsaw Uprising. As part of the project, the Institute of National Remembrance appealed to the residents of Wola to report direct and indirect witnesses of the massacre in order to document their testimonies.

On 31 July 2014, a bilingual plaque commemorating the victims of the Warsaw Uprising was unveiled on the wall of the town hall in Westerland on the island of Sylt. The inscription on the plaque mentions that Heinz Reinefarth – co-responsible for numerous crimes committed in Warsaw in 1944 – served for many years as the mayor of the town.

So far, no scientific monograph has been published dedicated to the Wola massacre. In the early 21st century, the Redemptorist Order established a team of historians tasked with gathering materials and preparing a publication on the subject. The first synthetic attempt at describing the Wola massacre, though not a scholarly work, was the book Rzeź Woli. Zbrodnia nierozliczona (The Wola Massacre. An Unaccounted Crime) by journalist Piotr Gursztyn, which was published in October 2014.

Since 2015, every August 5, the March of Memory of the Civilian Victims of the Warsaw Uprising has been held, commemorating, among others, the murdered residents of Wola. The march begins at the Monument to the Victims of the Wola Massacre at the junction of Leszno Street and Solidarity Avenue and ends at the Warsaw Insurgents Cemetery. The organizer of the event is the Warsaw Uprising Museum.

== See also ==
- Wola hospitals during the Warsaw Uprising
- Suppression of Mokotów
- Ochota massacre
- Wawer massacre
- Military history of the Warsaw Uprising
- Nazi crimes against ethnic Poles
- Tchorek plaques
- Nanjing Massacre
- Executions in Warsaw's police district

== Bibliography ==
- Borkiewicz, Adam (2018). Powstanie warszawskie. Zarys działań natury wojskowej [The Warsaw Uprising: An Outline of Military Actions] (in Polish). Warsaw: Muzeum Powstania Warszawskiego. ISBN 978-83-64308-20-8.
- Datner, Szymon; Leszczyński, Kazimierz, eds. (1962). Zbrodnie okupanta w czasie powstania warszawskiego w 1944 roku (w dokumentach) [Crimes of the Occupier During the Warsaw Uprising in 1944 (in Documents)] (in Polish). Warsaw: MON.
- Gursztyn, Piotr (2014). Rzeź Woli. Zbrodnia nierozliczona [The Wola Massacre: An Unaccounted Crime] (in Polish). Warsaw: DEMART SA. ISBN 978-83-7427-869-0.
- Habowski, Eryk, ed. (2019). Wola 1944. Nierozliczona zbrodnia a pojęcie ludobójstwa [Wola 1944: An Unaccounted Crime and the Concept of Genocide] (in Polish). Warsaw: Instytut Solidarności i Męstwa im. Witolda Pileckiego. ISBN 978-83-66340-05-3.
- Ingrao, Christian (2011). Czarni Myśliwi. Brygada Dirlewangera [The Black Hunters: The Dirlewanger Brigade] (in Polish). Wołowiec: Wydawnictwo Czarne. ISBN 978-83-7536-278-7.
- Kirchmayer, Jerzy (1984). Powstanie Warszawskie [The Warsaw Uprising] (in Polish). Warsaw: Książka i Wiedza. ISBN 83-05-11-080-X.
- Kuberski, Hubert (2021). "Walki SS-Sonderregiment Dirlewanger o Wolę a egzekucje zbiorowe ludności cywilnej" [The SS-Sonderregiment Dirlewanger's Battles for Wola and the Mass Executions of Civilians]. Dzieje Najnowsze (in Polish). LIII (I). ISSN 0419-8824.
- Ludność cywilna w powstaniu warszawskim [The Civilian Population in the Warsaw Uprising] (in Polish). Warsaw: Państwowy Instytut Wydawniczy. 1974.
- Motyl, Maja; Rutkowski, Stanisław (1994). Powstanie Warszawskie – rejestr miejsc i faktów zbrodni [The Warsaw Uprising – A Register of Crime Sites and Facts] (in Polish). Warsaw: IPN.
- Mórawski, Karol; Oktabiński, Krzysztof; Świerczek, Lidia (2000). Wola. Przewodnik historyczny po miejscach walk i straceń z dni Powstania Warszawskiego [Wola: A Historical Guide to the Sites of Battles and Executions During the Days of the Warsaw Uprising] (in Polish). Warsaw: Wystawa Warszawa Walczy 1939–1945. ISBN 83-87545-26-0.
- Przygoński, Antoni (1980). Powstanie warszawskie w sierpniu 1944 r. [The Warsaw Uprising in August 1944] (in Polish). Warsaw: PWN. ISBN 83-01-00293-X.
- Richie, Alexandra (2014). Warszawa 1944. Tragiczne powstanie [Warsaw 1944: The Tragic Uprising] (in Polish). Warsaw: W.A.B. ISBN 978-83-280-0986-8.
- Sawicki, Jerzy (1949). Zburzenie Warszawy. Zeznania generałów niemieckich przed polskim prokuratorem członkiem polskiej delegacji przy Międzynarodowym Trybunale Wojennym w Norymberdze [The Destruction of Warsaw: Testimonies of German Generals Before the Polish Prosecutor, a Member of the Polish Delegation to the Nuremberg International Military Tribunal] (in Polish). Warsaw: Kolumna.
- Sawicki, Tadeusz (2010). Rozkaz zdławić powstanie. Niemcy i ich sojusznicy w walce z powstaniem warszawskim [The Order to Crush the Uprising: Germans and Their Allies in the Fight Against the Warsaw Uprising] (in Polish). Warsaw: Bellona. ISBN 978-83-11-11892-8.
- Sennerteg, Niclas (2009). Kat Warszawy [The Executioner of Warsaw] (in Polish). Warsaw: Sensacje XX wieku. ISBN 978-83-61232-03-2.
- Serwański, Edward; Trawińska, Irena, eds. (1946). Zbrodnia niemiecka w Warszawie 1944 r. [The German Crime in Warsaw in 1944] (in Polish). Poznań: Wydawnictwo Instytutu Zachodniego.
- Utracka, Katarzyna (2009). Powstańcze miejsca pamięci. Wola 1944 [Insurgent Memorial Sites: Wola 1944] (in Polish). Warsaw: Urząd Dzielnicy Wola m.st. Warszawy. ISBN 978-83-911262-3-3.
