= 23rd Panzer Division =

German army division during World War II

- 23. Panzer-Division
- Unit insignia
- Active: 1942–1945
- Country: Germany
- Branch: Army
- Type: Panzer
- Role: Armoured warfare
- Size: Division
- Garrison/HQ: Wehrkreis V: Ludwigsburg
- Engagements: Battle of the Caucasus; Battle of Stalingrad; Operation Winter Storm

The 23rd Panzer Division (English: 23rd Tank Division) was an armoured division in the German Army during World War II. Formed in France in late 1941, the division spent its entire combat history on the Eastern Front.

== History ==
The 23rd Panzer Division was established on the 21st of September 1941 in France. It was built around the 101st Panzer Brigade and two infantry regiments and initially equipped with "booty tanks" which were soon after exchanged for German tanks.

In March 1942, the division went to the Eastern Front near Kharkov as a subdivision of the German Sixth Army. It was to remain within the Army Group South for the major part of its service. The division took part in the German advance to the Caucasus, but was subsequently sent north to Stalingrad. It escaped encirclement when the 6th Army was trapped there, and took part in the subsequent failed relief attempt. At the end of its first year on the Eastern Front the 23rd Panzer Division had lost 90 percent of its tanks.

On 20 November 1943, 23rd Panzer Division possessed 27 tanks, of which 16 were operational.

The 23rd Panzer Division was part of the German defence and retreat in the southern Ukraine, frequently being moved between crisis points. Between April and July 1944 it was a part of the 8th Army within the Army Group South Ukraine defending the area to the north of Jassy.

After being sent to Poland in mid-1944, the division returned to the southern sector during the collapse of the German frontline in Romania. After the retreat into Hungary the division fought in defensive battles there. The majority of the division was trapped and destroyed in Székesfehérvár in March 1945. The remainder of the division surrendered to British forces in May 1945.

== Commanders ==
The commanders of the division:

- Generalleutnant Hans Reichsfreiherr von Boineburg-Lengsfeld (25 September – 16 November 1941)
- Generalmajor Heinz-Joachim Werner-Ehrenfeucht (16–22 November 1941)
- Generalleutnant Hans Reichsfreiherr von Boineburg-Lengsfeld (22 November 1941 – 20 July 1942)
- Generalmajor Erwin Mack † (20 July – 26 August 1942)
- Generalleutnant Hans Reichsfreiherr von Boineburg-Lengsfeld (26 August – 26 December 1942)
- General der Panzertruppe Nikolaus von Vormann (26 December 1942 – 25 October 1943)
- Generalmajor Ewald Kräber (25 October – 1 November 1943)
- Generalmajor Heinz-Joachim Werner-Ehrenfeucht (1–18 November 1943)
- Generalmajor Ewald Kräber (18 November 1943 – 9 June 1944)
- Generalleutnant Joseph von Radowitz (9 June 1944 – 8 May 1945)
