= Hans von Boineburg-Lengsfeld =

German general (1889–1980)

Hans Freiherr von Boineburg-Lengsfeld
- Born: 9 June 1889; Eisenach, Grand Duchy of Saxe-Weimar-Eisenach, German Empire
- Died: 20 November 1980 (aged 91); Felsberg, Hesse, West Germany
- Relatives: m. 1920 Gummet Töttermann; two daughters
- Military career
- Allegiance: German Empire; Weimar Republic; Nazi Germany
- Branch: German Army
- Service years: 1910–1945
- Rank: Generalleutnant
- Commands: 4th Panzer Division; 23rd Panzer Division
- Conflicts: World War I; World War II; Invasion of Poland; Battle of the Netherlands; Operation Barbarossa; Battle of the Caucasus
- Awards: Knight's Cross of the Iron Cross

Wilhelm Georg Gustav Botho Rudolf Hans Reichsfreiherr von Boineburg-Lengsfeld (9 June 1889 – 20 November 1980) was a German general in the Wehrmacht of Nazi Germany who commanded the 4th and 23rd Panzer Divisions during World War II. He was also a recipient of the Knight's Cross of the Iron Cross of Nazi Germany.

== Biography ==
Born in Thuringia, Boineburg-Lengsfeld joined the army of Imperial Germany as an Fahnen-junker (officer cadet) in 1910. He was commissioned in the light infantry and fought in World War I. In the interwar period, he served in the Reichsheer and then the Wehrmacht. He led the 1st Rifle Regiment from 1938 to 1939 before being given command of the 4th Schützen (Rifle) Brigade of the 4th Panzer Division which fought in the Invasion of Poland. He temporarily commanded the division for a few days in May 1940, during the campaign in Holland, and was awarded the Knight's Cross of the Iron Cross on 19 July 1940. Now an oberst (colonel), a more substantive period in command of the 4th Panzer Division followed from late July to September 1940. He was then transferred to the 7th Panzer Division, serving occupation duty in France and then in Russia during Operation Barbarossa, as commander of its 7th Schützen Brigade.

When the 23rd Panzer Division was formed in September 1941, Boineburg-Lengsfeld was appointed its commander. He was promoted to generalmajor (Note: In the Wehrmacht, the rank of generalmajor is equivalent to that of brigadier general in the United States Army.) shortly afterwards. He led the division during the Battle of the Caucasus but was relieved of command during the "Reichel Case", when plans for Case Blue, the codename for the Wehrmacht's summer offensive in Southern Russia, were lost to the Soviets. However, when his successor as commander, Generalmajor Erwin Mack, was killed in action, he returned as the division's permanent leader. In late December 1942, having received a promotion to Generalleutnant (Note: The rank of generalleutnant is equivalent to that of major general in the United States Army.) on 16 November 1942 with effect from 1 October 1942, he was injured as a result of an accident with a tank. With several broken bones, he underwent an extended period in hospital.

After recovering from his injuries, Boineburg-Lengsfeld was made the commandant of greater Paris. When that city was captured by the Allies in August 1944 after the Invasion of Normandy, he took a post at OB West. His participation in the 20 July plot to assassinate Adolf Hitler went undetected and he ended the war as commander of Maneuver Area Bergen. He died on 20 November 1980 in Felsberg.

== Awards and decorations ==
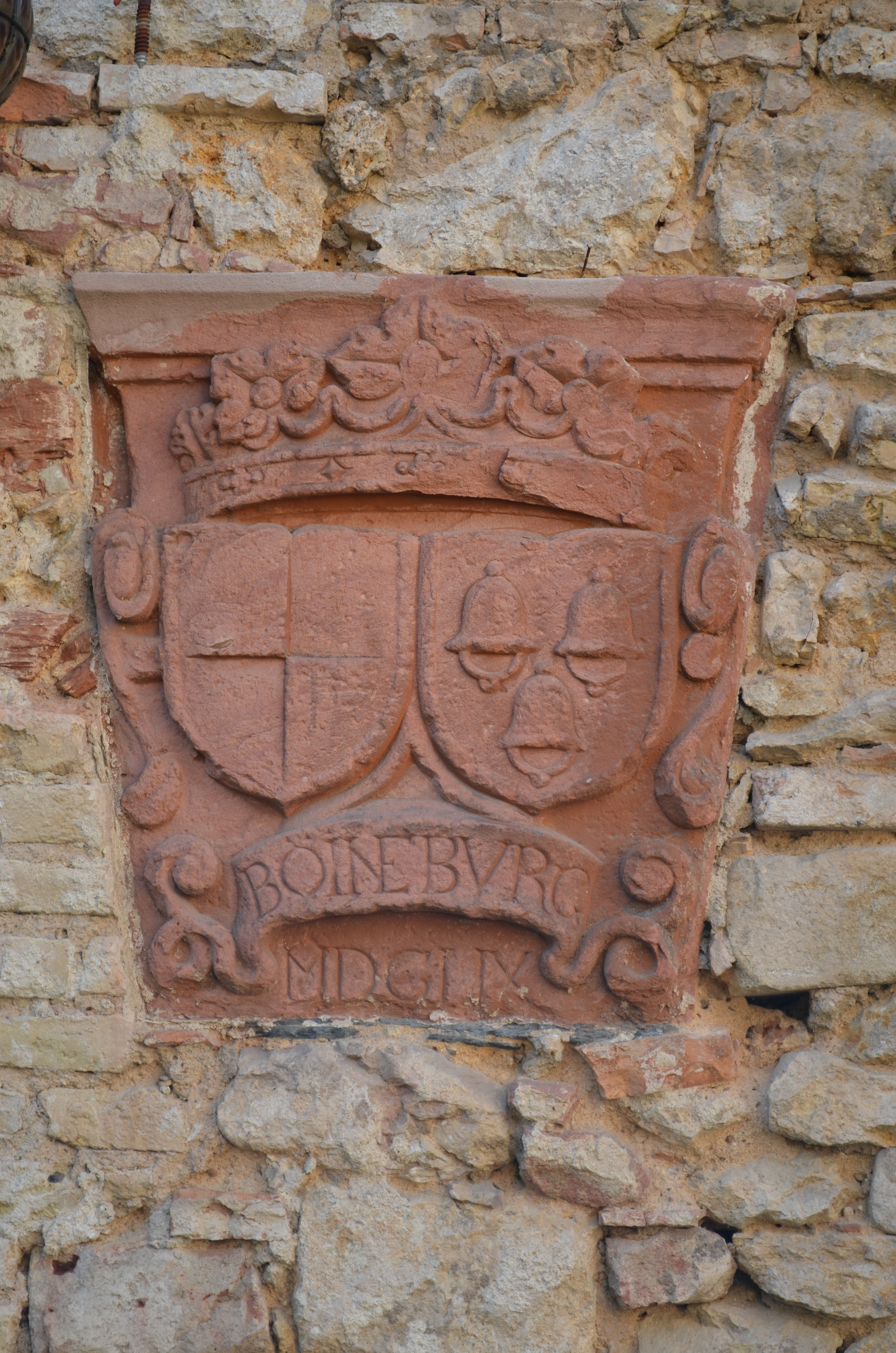

- Iron Cross (1914), 2nd and 1st Class
  - 2nd Class on 29 September 1914
  - 1st Class on 1 October 1917
- Albert Order, Knight's Cross 2nd Class with Swords (SA3bX) on 3 February 1915
- Order of the White Falcon, Knight's Cross 2nd Class with Swords (GSF3bX/SF3bX) on 9 June 1915
- Wilhelm Ernst War Cross (GSK/SW) on 1 December 1917
- Knight of Honour of the Order of Saint John (Bailiwick of Brandenburg) on 23 June 1922
- The Honour Cross of the World War 1914/1918 with Swords on 20 December 1934
- Hungarian World War Commemorative Medal with Swords
- Wehrmacht Long Service Award, 4th to 1st Class on 2 October 1936
- Repetition Clasp 1939 to the Iron Cross 1914, 2nd and 1st Class
  - 2nd Class on 24 September 1939
  - 1st Class on 1 October 1939
- Panzer Badge in Bronze on 17 July 1940
- Knight's Cross of the Iron Cross on 19 July 1940 as Oberst and commander of the 4. Schützen-Brigade

== Notes ==
Footnotes

Citations

Military offices
Preceded by Generalmajor Johann Stever	Commander of 4th Panzer Division; 24 July 1940 – 8 September 1940	Succeeded by General der Panzertruppe Willibald Freiherr von Langermann und Erlencamp
Preceded by None	Commander of 23rd Panzer Division; 25 September 1941 – 20 July 1942	Succeeded by Generalmajor Erwin Mack
Preceded by Oberst Erich Brueckner	Commander of 23rd Panzer Division; September 1942 – 26 December 1942	Succeeded by General der Panzertruppe Nikolaus von Vormann
