= Nikolaus von Vormann =

German General (1895–1959)

- Born: 24 December 1895; Neumark, German Empire
- Died: 26 October 1959 (aged 63); Berchtesgaden, Bavaria West Germany
- Military career
- Allegiance: German Empire; Weimar Republic; Nazi Germany
- Branch: German Army
- Service years: 1914–1945
- Rank: General der Panzertruppe
- Commands: 23rd Panzer Division; XLVII Panzer Corps; 9th Army
- Conflicts: World War I; World War II; Invasion of Poland; Battle of France; Operation Barbarossa; Siege of Leningrad; Battle of Stalingrad; Cherkassy Pocket; Operation Bagration
- Awards: Knight's Cross of the Iron Cross; Knight's Cross with Swords of the Royal House Order of Hohenzollern; German Cross in Gold; Iron Cross 1st and 2nd Class

Nikolaus von Vormann (24 December 1895 – 26 October 1959) was a German general who served in the Wehrmacht of Nazi Germany.

General von Vormann was born in Neumark, West Prussia, German Empire. He joined the Prussian Army in 1914 and served in World War I and remained in the Weimar German Reichswehr. In World War II he served on the Eastern Front campaigns and in 1944 briefly commanded the 9th Army. During this brief interval, he became involved in the suppression of the Warsaw Uprising, although the main responsibility for the wanton destruction of the Polish capital and the massacre of its inhabitants laid with the SS-generals Erich von dem Bach-Zelewski and Heinz Reinefarth. On 4 May 1945, as the Allies approached during the closing days of World War II, von Vormann's last appointment was as commander of the largely non-existent "Alpenfestung" (Alpine Fortress). He was a recipient of the Knight's Cross of the Iron Cross. Vormann wrote two books documenting his war-time experiences: Der Feldzug 1939 in Polen and Tscherkassy. He died on 26 October 1959 in Berchtesgaden.

== Promotions ==
- General der Panzertruppe (General of the Armored Corps) - 27 June 1944, with seniority date of 1 December 1943
- Generalleutnant (Lieutenant General) - 1 July 1943
- Generalmajor (Major General) - 31 January 1943, with seniority date of 1 January 1943
- Oberst (Colonel) - 1 September 1940
- Oberstleutnant (Lieutenant Colonel) - 1 August 1938
- Major (Major) - 1 November 1935, with seniority date of 1 October 1935
- Hauptmann (Captain) - 30 May 1932, with seniority date of 1 June 1930
- Oberleutnant (First Lieutenant) - 1 February 1926, with seniority date of 1 April 1925
- Leutnant (Second Lieutenant) - 29 January 1915, with seniority date of 18 January 1915
- Kadett (Cadet) - Until 3 August 1914 when became war volunteer in the Royal Prussian Army

== Awards and decorations ==
- Wound Badge in Gold (for wounds received during World War I)
- Iron Cross (1914)
  - 2nd Class
  - 1st Class
- Knight's Cross with Swords of the Royal House Order of Hohenzollern (18 June 1915)
- Clasp to the Iron Cross
  - 2nd Class (20 October 1939)
  - 1st Class (25 June 1940)
- German Cross in Gold on 12 March 1942 as Oberst im Generalstab (in the General Staff) in the Generalkommando of the XXVIII. Armeekorps
- Knight's Cross of the Iron Cross on 22 August 1943 as Generalleutnant and commander of the 23. Panzer-Division

Military offices
Preceded by Generalleutnant Hans Reichsfreiherr von Boineburg-Lengsfeld	Commander of 23. Panzer-Division; 26 December 1942 – 24 October 1943	Succeeded by Generalmajor Ewald Kräber
Preceded by Generalleutnant Rudolf von Bünau	Commander of XLVII. Panzerkorps; December 1943 – March 1944	Succeeded by General der Panzertruppe Hans Freiherr von Funck
Preceded by General der Infanterie Hans Jordan	Commander of 9. Armee; 27 June 1944 – 31 August 1944	Succeeded by General der Panzertruppe Smilo Freiherr von Lüttwitz
