= Oskar Dirlewanger =

German military officer and war criminal (1895–1945)

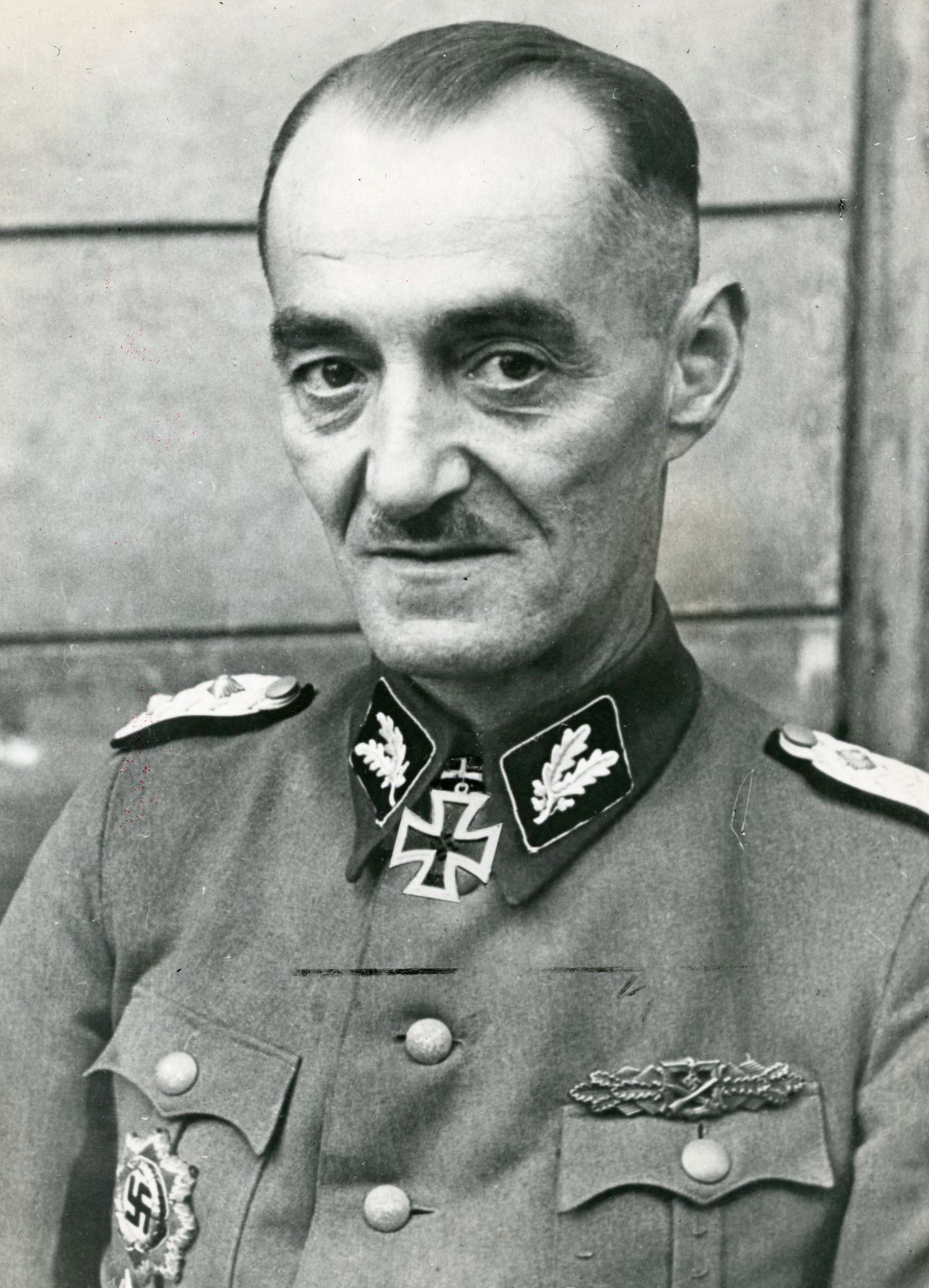
- Dirlewanger in August 1944
- Born: Oskar Anton Paul Dirlewanger; 26 September 1895; Würzburg, Kingdom of Bavaria, German Empire
- Died: c. 7 June 1945 (aged 49); Altshausen, Baden-Württemberg, Allied-occupied Germany
- Burial place: Altshausen Military Cemetery
- Education: Goethe University Frankfurt
- Military career
- Allegiance: German Empire; Nazi Germany
- Branch: Imperial German Army; Freikorps; Spanish Legion; Condor Legion; SS-Totenkopfverbände; Waffen-SS
- Service years: 1913–1919; 1919–1923; 1937–1939; 1940–1945
- Rank: SS-Oberführer
- Nicknames: Gandhi; Butcher of Warsaw
- Commands: Dirlewanger Brigade
- Conflicts: World War I; Freikorps operations; Spanish Civil War; World War II; Anti-partisan operations in Belarus; Warsaw Uprising; Slovak National Uprising; Battle of Ipolysag; Battle of Guben
- Awards: Knight's Cross of the Iron Cross; German Cross in Gold; Close Combat Clasp; Clasp to the Iron Cross; Spanish Cross
- Criminal information
- Status: Deceased
- Conviction: Sexual offense involving a minor (1934)
- Penalty: 2 years' imprisonment (1934; annulled 1940)

Details
- Date apprehended: 1 June 1945
- Imprisoned at: Ludwigsburg Prison [de] (1934–36); Welzheim concentration camp (1936); Altshausen prison camp (1945)

Oskar Paul Dirlewanger (26 September 1895 – c. 7 June 1945) was a German military officer, mass murderer and war criminal. He commanded the Dirlewanger Brigade, a penal military unit of the Waffen-SS which served in World War II. Dirlewanger's unit is often considered the most notorious Waffen-SS unit, committing some of the conflict's worst atrocities, with Dirlewanger himself regarded as perhaps Nazi Germany's "most extreme executioner", engaging in frequent acts of violence, rape, and murder. He is believed to have died after the war while in Allied custody.

Dirlewanger had an impressive career as a junior officer during World War I. He fought in the post-World War I conflicts in Germany as a minor commander in the Freikorps militia movement, with the troops he led then also characterized by excessive violence, and participated in the Spanish Civil War. Through his service with the Condor Legion during the Spanish Civil War, he was politically rehabilitated despite his criminal record, allowing his return to favor within the Nazi Party. He was a habitual offender, convicted in interwar Germany for illegal weapons possession and a sexual offense involving a minor; the latter conviction was annulled in 1940. During World War II, he was appointed and headed a special Waffen-SS unit that was officially named after him and was composed for the most part of conscripted convicts and other prisoners.

Serving mostly in Poland and Belarus, he has been closely linked to many atrocities, being responsible for the deaths of at least tens of thousands. In Belarus alone, Dirlewanger may have been responsible for around 120,000 killed and 200 villages destroyed. In Warsaw, he was responsible for up to 30,000 killed, most of them non-combatants. His methods included rape and torture, and he personally kept numerous women as his sex slaves. He also repeatedly engaged in systematic looting, amassing stolen property for personal use. His unit is considered to have committed the worst crimes of the suppression of the Warsaw Uprising, alongside the Kaminski Brigade, though Timothy Snyder described the behavior of Dirlewanger as being even worse. Besides brutality to civilians and captured enemy combatants, Dirlewanger was ruthless to his men, whom he would beat and kill if they displeased him. His unit is further regarded as the war's most infamous in Belarus, as well as Poland, and arguably the worst military force in modern European history based in terms of criminality and cruelty.

Dirlewanger deserted in April 1945. He was captured by French authorities in June and then died shortly afterward while in Allied custody. Although postwar rumors claimed that he had survived and fled abroad to Egypt, these were later disproven following the exhumation and forensic identification of his remains in 1960, which confirmed that he died in 1945.

== Early life ==
Oskar Dirlewanger was the son of August Dirlewanger, an attorney and a merchant, and Pauline Dirlewanger (née Herrlinger). Dirlewanger's paternal grandfather worked in Stuttgart as a surgeon and vaccinator, and his maternal grandfather as a primary school teacher. The Dirlewanger family was of Swabian origin. In December 1893, August and Pauline married in Esslingen am Neckar on December and shortly before the birth of their first daughter, they moved to Würzburg. Their first daughter, Mathilde Dirlewanger was born on 7 June 1894. On 26 September 1895, the second child of the family, Oskar Paul Dirlewanger was born. Three years later on 28 December 1898, their second daughter, Elfriede Dirlewanger was born.

On 1 July 1901, August Dirlewanger resigned from his merchant career and became a commercial proxy. This required him to move to Stuttgart and the family followed him there in October. On 9 December 1901, Pauline gave birth to the fourth child, Paul Dirlewanger. In the same year, Oskar began attending elementary school there and in 1903 he attended a preparatory class called Vorklasse. In Stuttgart, he also later attended the Realgymnasium there. In 1906, the Dirlewanger family moved back to Esslingen am Neckar where they lived in an apartment building located at Kesselwasen 16. In May 1906, he attended the Esslinger Gymnasium (known today as the Georgii-Gymnasium) and later, moved to the Schelztor-Oberrealschule in 1910. On 16 September 1910, Dirlewanger was registered as a "trial" student due to his not outstanding grades on three subjects. This status was later revoked on 17 November 1910 when he had improved in the ninth grade.

He completed his Abitur and received his matriculation examination certificate on 30 June 1913. His results were as follows:

Grade	Subject(s)
Very Good (7)	History in German Literature
Good (6)	History, Geography
Satisfactory (5)	Philosophy, French, Religion, Physics, Analysis and Chemistry
Adequate (4)	Geometry, English, Natural Science, Drawing

His result on the matriculation examination placed him 11th out of 29 students. After passing the examination, Dirlewanger stated that he planned to study law, and his certificate listed "administrative lawyer" as his career preference.

He never married and he stood 1.83 metres (6.0 feet) tall. His religion was noted as Evangelical Christian.

== World War I ==
Dirlewanger enlisted in the Württemberg Army on 1 October 1913, and served as a machine gunner in the "König Karl" Grenadier Regiment 123, a part of the XIII (Royal Württemberg) Corps and as a one-year volunteer. With the outbreak of World War I on 2 August 1914, Dirlewanger's unit, as part of Crown Prince Wilhelm's 5th Army, was sent to the Western Front, where he initially took part in the Battle of the Ardennes and later fought in France and Luxembourg.

While serving on the Western Front, Dirlewanger was wounded several times, as a result of which he became "40 percent disabled." He received the Iron Cross 2nd Class and 1st Class, having been wounded six times, and finished the war with the rank of lieutenant, in charge of a company on the Eastern Front. According to his German biographer Knut Stang, Dirlewanger's WWI frontline experiences and their violence and barbarism determined his later life and "terror warfare" methods, in addition to his amoral personality shaped by sexual sadism and alcoholism.

On 22 August 1914, Dirlewanger was wounded twice during the Battle of the Ardennes. He was shot in the foot and sabred in the chest. The next day, he was wounded again when shrapnel struck his head. For his combat service, Dirlewanger was awarded the Iron Cross 2nd Class on 28 August 1914. He spent nearly four months recuperating from his wounds in field hospitals. On 14 April 1915, he was promoted to the rank of Leutnant and served as a platoon leader until 30 November 1916. On 7 September 1915, he was wounded again, suffering a gunshot wound to the hand and a bayonet injury to the right leg. On 4 October 1915, he was awarded the Württemberg Bravery Medal in Gold. He once again spent five months in several military hospitals at Trier and Esslingen recuperating from his recent wounds. On 13 July 1916, he was awarded the Iron Cross 1st Class.

Since December 1916, Dirlewanger served on the staff of the 7th Infantry Division. From January to March 1917, he served back at the frontline as the commander of the assault company of the 7th Infantry Division before moving to take command of the 2nd Machine-gun Company of the 123rd Infantry Regiment. He would lead this unit until October 1918. On 30 April 1918, he was shot in the left shoulder. By this time, the unit was in southern Russia and served in the occupation of Ukraine. At the cessation of hostilities, his battalion was supposed to be interned in Romania, but Dirlewanger decided to return his unit to Germany, and led 600 men from his company and other battalion units home. They departed Romania 26 November 1918 and arrived in Germany on 28 December 1918. He ended the war as an Oberleutnant der Reserve and, in June 1919 his service was assessed as very positive. Historian French MacLean described Dirlewanger as having "an outstanding military record in World War I" and that his service "was indeed an impressive military record for a junior officer".

== Interwar period ==
By the end of World War I, Dirlewanger was described in one police report as "a mentally unstable, violent fanatic and alcoholic, who had the habit of erupting into violence under the influence of drugs." The fact that he had succeeded, even after the ceasefire, in fighting his way back from the front in Romania to Germany with his men became for him the defining experience. Henceforth, he adopted an unrestrained mode of life, characterised by contempt for the laws and rules of civil society.

=== Freikorps ===
In 1919, Dirlewanger joined various Freikorps paramilitary militias (Epp, Haas, Sprésser and Holz) and fought against German communists in Thuringia, Ruhr, and Saxony, and against Polish insurgents in Upper Silesia. (for which he was awarded Order of the Upper Silesian Eagle II). He participated in the suppression of the German Revolution of 1918–19 with the Freikorps in multiple German cities in 1920 and 1921. At the same time, he studied at the Higher Commercial School in Mannheim, but was expelled from it for antisemitism. In 1919, Oberleutnant Dirlewanger formed a temporary defence platoon and fought as its leader against communists in various parts of the Weimar Republic. In that same year, he had suppressed several strikes in the town of Backnang, Kornwestheim, Untertürkheim, Aalen, and Schorndorf, and a year later in Heidenheim, as well as Communist revolts in Stuttgart and Esslingen. By 13 March 1920, now as a member of the Freikorps Haas, Dirlewanger served as the commander of an armoured train (Geschützter Zug Dirlewanger) in Stuttgart.

Later, he commanded an armed formation of students which was set up by him under the Württemberg "Highway Watch". Whatever troops he led were also characterized by excessive violence.

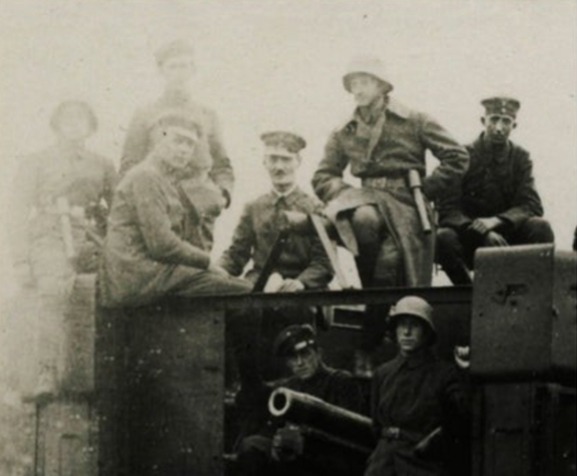
Oskar Dirlewanger while as a Freikorpsführer

On Easter Sunday 1921, Dirlewanger commanded an armoured train that moved towards Sangerhausen, which had been occupied by the Communist Party of Germany militia group of Max Hoelz in one of their raids intended to inspire worker uprisings. An attack by Dirlewanger failed, and the enemy militiamen succeeded in cutting off his force. After the latter was reinforced by pro-government troops during the night, the Communists withdrew from the town. During this operation, Dirlewanger was grazed on the head by a gunshot April 21, 1921. The results of this skirmish was 1 killed and 29 wounded of Dirlewanger force; Hoelz force had 20 killed and 70 injured. After the skirmish, he ordered a violent crackdown that saw hundreds imprisoned, many often severely tortured, including some that were uninvolved in any communist activities. After the Nazi Party gained power, Dirlewanger was celebrated as the town's "liberator from the Red terrorists" and received its honorary citizenship in 1935.

=== Career, NSDAP and Sturmabteilung ===
Between his militant forays, Dirlewanger studied at the Goethe University Frankfurt, and in 1922, obtained a doctorate in political science (Dr. rer. pol.). He wrote his doctoral thesis as an analysis and critique of the planned economy, titled: “Critique of the idea of a planned management of the economy." Between 1919 and 1922, he was a member of Deutschvölkischer Schutz- und Trutzbund, the largest and most active antisemitic organization in the Weimar Republic. The following year, he joined the NSDAP and its Sturmabteilung (SA) paramilitary militia. Dirlewanger's membership number was 12,517, but he left the party due to his imprisonment for possession of a firearm. During the Nazi Beer Hall Putsch in November 1923, Dirlewanger attempted to drive some armored cars, owned by the Stuttgart police authorities, from Stuttgart to Munich. Shortly after the failed putsch, he allowed his party membership to lapse. He rejoined the NSDAP in 1926 and received a new membership number of 13,556. However, he was forced to leave the party when he started working as an executive director of a textile factory owned by a Jewish family in Erfurt from 1928 to 1932, where he renounced active service in the SA but financially donated to the SA, possibly obtaining the money by embezzling from his company. Dirlewanger rejoined the NSDAP for a third time on 1 March 1932 and received a party number of 1,098,716. A month later, he officially joined the SA on 1 April 1932 and held various jobs, which included working at a bank and a knitwear factory. In 1933, after the Nazi seizure of power, Dirlewanger was rewarded by being made deputy director of the Heilbronn employment agency, a strategic post for local-level Nazi leaders.

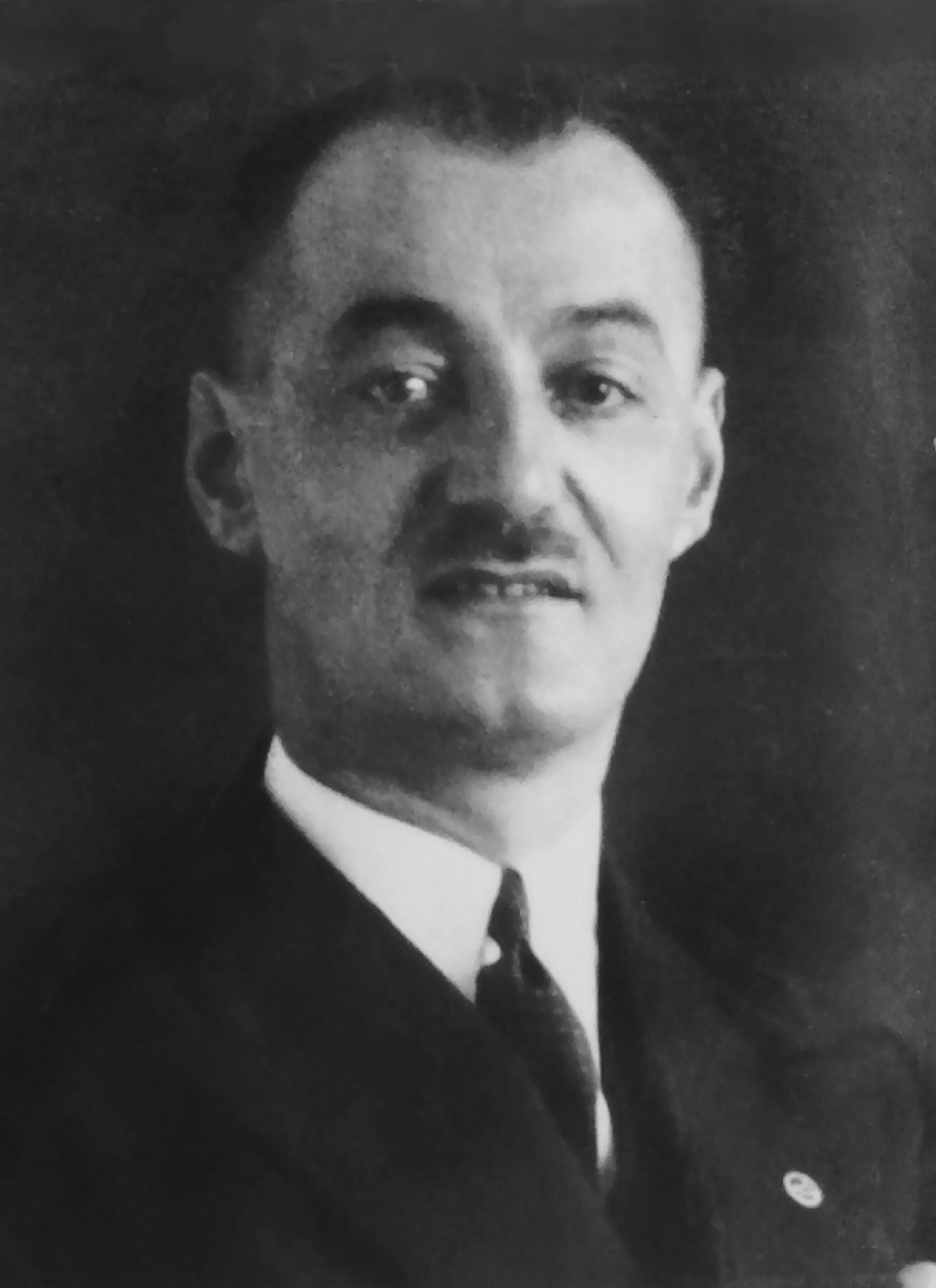
Dirlewanger in 1934

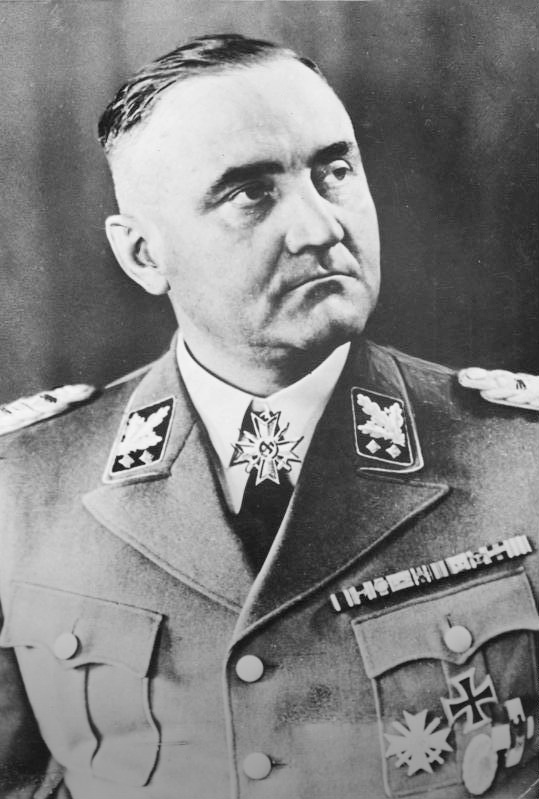
Gottlob Berger, Dirlewanger's patron and protector

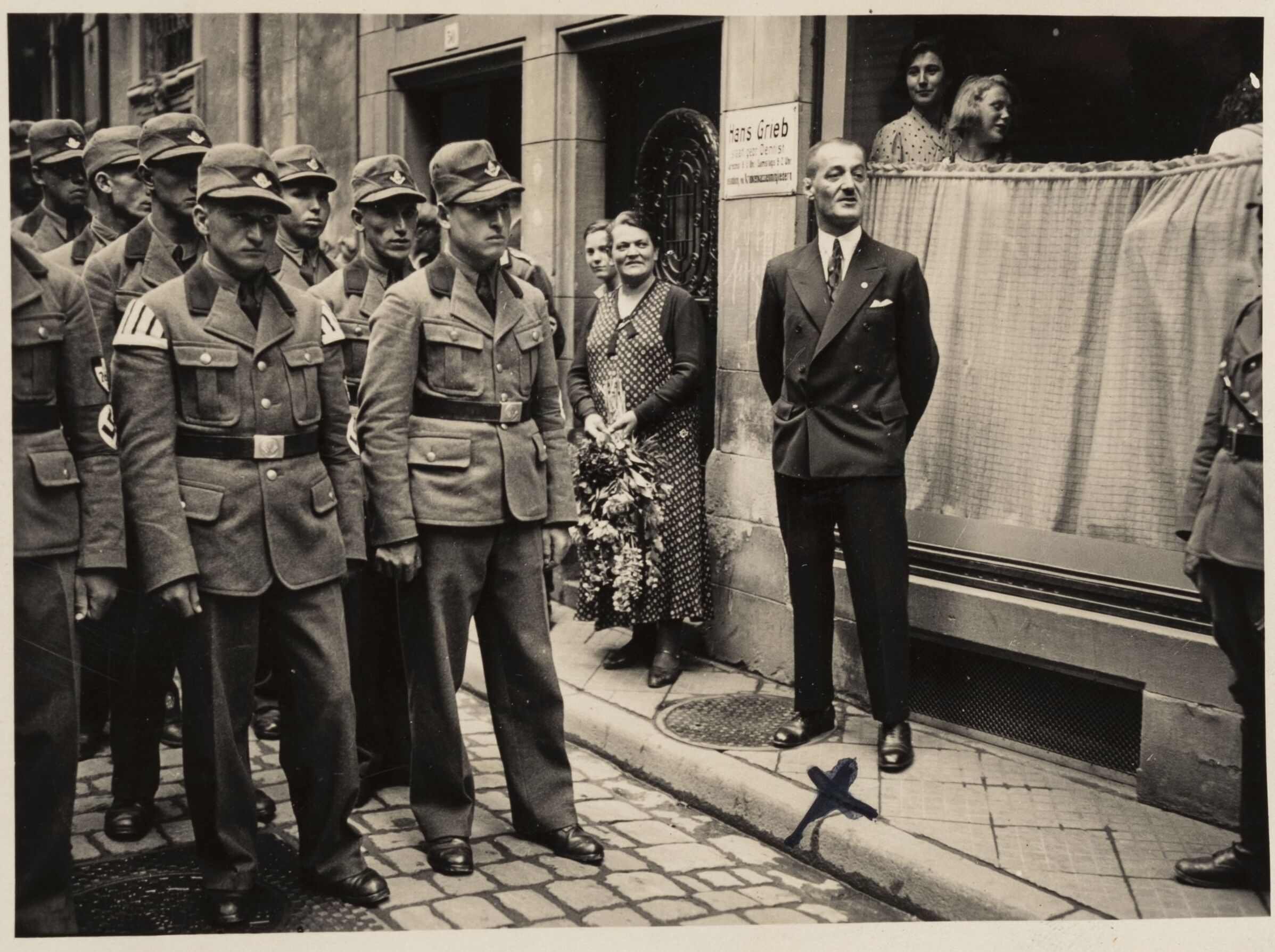
Dirlewanger at a parade in Heilbronn, 1937

Dirlewanger was repeatedly convicted for illegal arms possession and embezzlement. In 1934, he was convicted and sentenced to two years’ imprisonment for a morality offense involving a child under the age of 14. He lost his job, his doctor title, and all military honours, and was expelled from the party. Dirlewanger's protest against his party expulsion was rejected in 1936 due to his charges, noting the court's finding that he had repeatedly engaged in sexual activity with a girl from Heilbronn who was under the age of 14 and referred to additional incidents involving alcohol-related violence and misconduct. Soon after his release from the prison in Ludwigsburg, he was arrested again on the same charge and sent to the Welzheim concentration camp, but more likely it was for creating a disturbance before the Reich Chancellery, demanding the reversal of his criminal charges. His conviction was later annulled in 1940, and Dirlewanger was subsequently exonerated. However the court's accompanying record suggests that doubts about the underlying allegations were not fully eliminated. He was released and reinstated in the general reserve of the SS following the personal intervention of SS-Brigadeführer Hanz B., the Chief of the Reinforcement Office (Ergänzungsamt) and his wartime companion and local NSDAP cadre comrade Gottlob Berger, who was also a long-time personal friend of Reichsführer-SS Heinrich Himmler and had become the head of the SS Main Office (SS-Hauptamt, SS-HA).

== Spanish Civil War ==
Dirlewanger next went to Spain, where he enlisted in the Spanish Legion during the Spanish Civil War. Through Berger, he transferred to the German Condor Legion where he served from 1937 to 1939 and was wounded three times. From March 1937 to May 1939, Dirlewanger served as an instructor and a company commander in the Panzer Unit "Imker" under the command of Ritter von Thoma and at the same time served in the Condor Legion Non-Commissioned Officer School in San Roque since March 1937. He later was in charge of commanding the Panzergruppe "Drohne" unit in the spring of 1939. In November 1939, von Thoma wrote:

"Dr. Oskar Dirlewanger was with me in Spain at a training camp from April to October 1937 and from July 1938 to the end of May 1939, working mostly as a company commander and, during his 17-month tour, distinguished himself in his work as a trainer. In particular, he was also at the front, where he always conducted himself impeccably. Dr. Dirlewanger, a former World War I combatant and commander of a machine gun company, is a decorated soldier and, due to his training and sense of soldierly duty, is suitable for front-line combat."

Following further intervention on his behalf by his patron Berger, Dirlewanger successfully petitioned to have his case reconsidered in light of his service in Spain. He was reinstated into the NSDAP, albeit with a higher party number (No. 1,098,716). His doctorate was also restored by the University of Frankfurt on 4 April 1941. Shortly after his return to Germany, Dirlewanger took up work as an independent auditor of commercial books.

== World War II ==
On 4 July 1939, Dirlewanger sent a letter to Himmler regarding his admission into the Waffen-SS. However, on 19 August 1939, Dirlewanger's entry into the Waffen-SS was denied due to his previous conviction in 1934. Although he was denied, Dirlewanger was given an alternative, that he was allowed to volunteer to any Wehrmacht department. Dirlewanger's case was reopened when the third chamber of District Court in Württemberg-Hohenzollern issued its final ruling on 20 May 1940. On 30 April, Dirlewanger sent a letter to the court stating that he was wrongly convicted and refused to file a petition for clemency, as he believed that by doing so he would imply guilt. Instead, he requested that his case be reopened. Following his exoneration by the Higher State Court in Stuttgart, he requested that the party court proceedings be resumed and that his NSDAP membership be restored. He also stated that he had suffered significant financial hardship as a result of the wrongful conviction and requested that party dues from the time of his expulsion until 1 May be waived. However, he expressed willingness to pay all dues from 1 May onward, and asked for a swift resolution of his application. Dirlewanger consistently maintained his innocence, claiming he had been unaware of the girl's true age and that she had stated she was nearly 17 and attending vocational school. While imprisoned, he began working to reopen the case, efforts he continued after his release. From 1937 to 1939, he fought in the Spanish Civil War with the Condor Legion and was awarded the Spanish Cross in Silver for his service. Even before returning from Spain, he resumed his legal efforts, supported by the State Court in Heilbronn. On 26 March 1939, the Higher State Court in Stuttgart accepted the motion for retrial, and during a general assembly held on 29–30 April 1940, his 1934 conviction was annulled. He was fully exonerated, the costs were charged to the state, and the Party Court subsequently nullified his expulsion from the NSDAP, declaring the case legally closed as no objections were raised by party leadership.

Thus, Berger immediately attempted to accelerate Dirlewanger's entry into the Waffen-SS. On 4 June 1940, he wrote a letter to Himmler, recommending that Dirlewanger's admission be expedited. Berger also proposed that Dirlewanger should be entrusted with the training of convicted poachers gathered at Sachsenhausen concentration camp near Berlin, emphasizing his extensive and modern military training. Himmler eventually agreed and instructed his personal secretary, Rudolf Brandt, to notify the Waffen-SS Replacement Department to take the necessary steps to hasten Dirlewanger's admission. On 22 June 1940, Berger had also personally written to the Replacement Department, reiterating that the process should be accelerated. Finally, on 24 June 1940, Dirlewanger's application was approved. He was admitted into the reserve ranks of the Waffen-SS with the rank of SS-Obersturmführer der Reserve and assigned to the SS-Totenkopfstandarte unit stationed in Oranienburg where he was also appointed as an Inspectorate officer of the SS-Totenkopfverbände (SS-TV).

Despite Himmler preferring executioners who exhibited self-control and were efficient while appearing humane, he was not opposed to "lowering his bar and hiring a sadistic psychopath and convicted pedophile like Oskar Dirlewanger." Such unit was created in Oranienburg on 1 July, originally as the Wilddieb Kommando Oranienburg, later known as the SS-Sonderkommando "Dirlewanger" or the so-called Dirlewanger Brigade. Dirlewanger was given the task of conducting military training among poachers serving their sentences in the Sachsenhausen concentration camp. His command was at first designated as a special battalion (Sonderbataillon), later expanded to a special regiment (Sonderregiment) and an assault brigade (Sturmbrigade), before being eventually reformed into an infantry ("grenadier") division at the end of the war (although it never reached the division size). It soon lost its original character as Dirlewanger began recruiting all kinds of prisoners and volunteers, including the clinically insane and the non-Germans.

The unit was first assigned to the General Government, the non-annexed territories of occupied Poland, for security duties against the Polish resistance in the city of Lublin and its surrounding towns and countryside. Arriving there in September 1940, they were also to help regarding the pre-Final Solution abortive Nisko Plan to create a Jewish resettlement zone in the Lublin area (a project already abandoned by then), guarding three labour camps for Jews, with Dirlewanger himself personally in charge of the camp at Stary Dzików as its commandant. In 1941, his misconduct was the subject of an abuse investigation by the SS Court Main Office judge Georg Konrad Morgen, who accused Dirlewanger of wanton acts of murder, corruption, and the crime of Rassenschande or race defilement with a Jewish woman named Sarah Bergmann. According to Morgen, who in his investigation was assisted by the local Gestapo chief and former criminal police detective Johannes Müller, "Dirlewanger was a nuisance and a terror to the entire population. He repeatedly pillaged the ghetto in Lublin, extorting ransoms." Once Dirlewanger poisoned 57 Jews on his own initiative. Acts committed by Dirlewanger include burning the genitals of women he abused with a petrol lighter, whipping them naked, and injecting strychnine into Jewish girls and then watching their death agonies in the officers' mess. Dirlewanger would often rape children, whether boy or girl, and then shoot them afterwards, with many of his victims being from the Lublin ghetto. Morgen requested Friedrich-Wilhelm Krüger, the Higher SS and Police Leader for the General Government, for an arrest warrant against Dirlewanger, but Krüger was blocked by Berger. In a post-war testimony, which historian Raul Hilberg noted as "one of the first instances that reference was made to the 'soap-making rumour'," Morgen stated that:

Dirlewanger had arrested people illegally and arbitrarily, and as for his female prisoners—young Jewesses—he did the following against them: he called together a small circle of friends consisting of members of a Wehrmacht supply unit. Then he made so-called scientific experiments, which involved stripping the victims of their clothes. Then they [the victims] were given an injection of strychnine. Dirlewanger looked on, smoked a cigarette, as did his friends, and they saw how these girls were dying. Immediately after that the corpses were cut into small pieces, mixed with horsemeat, and boiled into soap.

According to historian Peter Longerich, "Dirlewanger's leadership of the Sonderkommando was characterized by continued alcohol abuse, looting, sadistic atrocities, rape, and murder—and his mentor Berger tolerated this behaviour, as did Himmler, who so urgently needed men such as Dirlewanger in his fight against 'subhumanity'." It was important to the Reichsführer, however, that the detachments within the Sonderkommando did not belong to the Waffen-SS, but merely serve it. In his letter to Himmler, SS-Brigadeführer Odilo Globocnik (later the leader of the Operation Reinhard, the extermination camps for Polish Jews) initially recommended Dirlewanger as "an excellent leader." During the Ministries Trial after the war, Berger said: "Now Dr. Dirlewanger was hardly a good boy. You can't say that. But he was a good soldier, and he had one big mistake that he didn't know when to stop drinking." He was notoriously brutal toward his own men, forcing their compliance by involving them in the unit's murders. He maintained control through draconian discipline that ignored military law, frequently resorting to arbitrary beatings and even the execution of his own soldiers. He was described by historian Richard C. Lukas as "an ascetic-looking man who treated his own men as brutally as he treated the Poles. Beating them with clubs to maintain discipline was not uncommon. He even casually shot men he did not like." Another one of Dirlewanger's punishments included the "Dirlewanger coffin", in which a soldier could be locked up in a narrow box for days. Eventually, due to how egregious Dirlewanger's disciplinary methods were and as a result, dropping troop morale, Himmler issued an order tailored towards the battalion to place limits on the disciplinary authority of Dirlewanger. Historian Richard Rhodes wrote how the "resulting organization was so vicious—enthusiastically extorting, raping, torturing and murdering Poles and Jews—that it even disgusted men like Globocnik, who had it transferred out of the General Government and into Byelorussia to fight partisans."

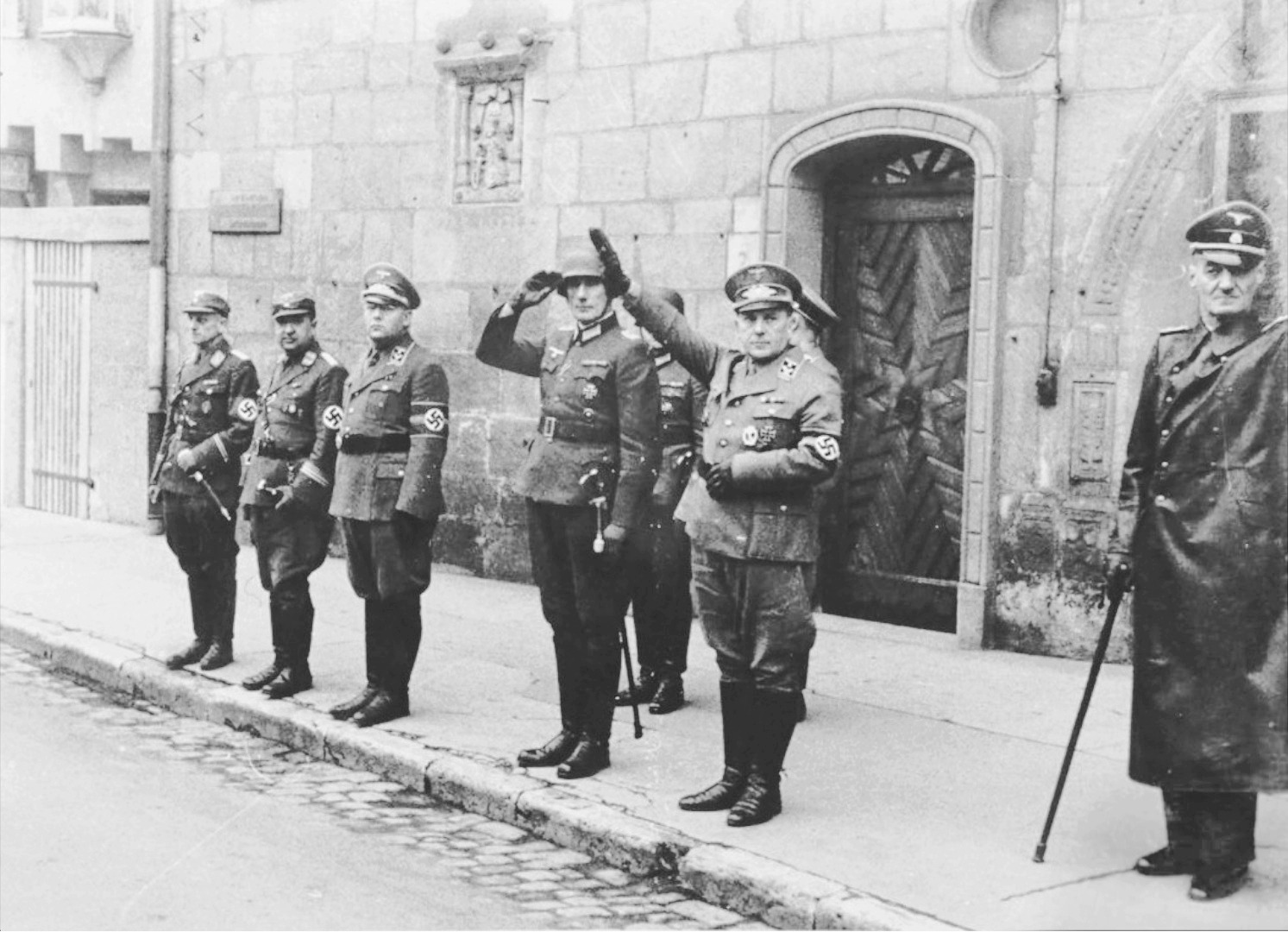
SS-Obersturmbannführer Dirlewanger (right) standing next to a group of NSDAP officials at a Nazi parade near Kielmeyerhaus, Germany, in December 1943. Dirlewanger was still recuperating from a gunshot wound to his chest, received during anti-partisan operations in Belarus, explaining why he is holding a cane and saluting with his left arm.

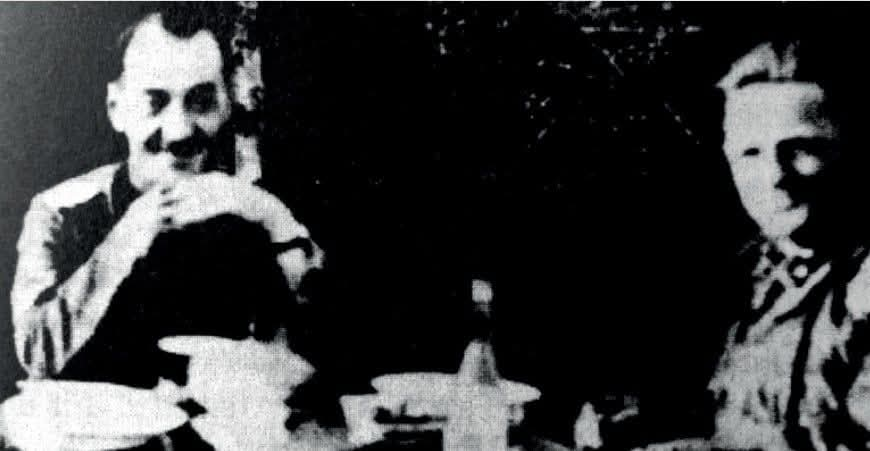
SS-Obersturmbannführer Oskar Dirlewanger and an SS-Oberscharführer resting during an anti-partisan operation in Belarus, 1943

In February 1942, Dirlewanger and his unit were assigned to the "bandit-fighting" (Bandenbekämpfung), the Nazi counter-insurgency against the Soviet partisans in rural Belarus, as well as (with the Final Solution now in motion) the extermination of Belarusian Jews (already concentrated in the ghettos) above all. In the September 1942 Operation Swamp Fever, for instance, they first participated in the killing of 8,350 Jews in Baranavichy Ghetto, and then killed 389 (non-Jewish) "bandits" and 1,274 "suspects". They became infamous for burning and indiscriminately massacring entire Belarusian villages. According to historian Timothy Snyder, "Dirlewanger's preferred method was to herd the local population inside a barn, set the barn on fire, and then shoot with machine guns anyone who tried to escape." One incident recounted by an anonymous member of the unit described how a village of around 2,500 was killed in such way, with Dirlewanger himself at the forefront of the massacre. Rounded-up civilians were also routinely used as human shields and marched over minefields, the latter method dubbed a "Dirlewanger mine detector" by the Higher SS and Police Leader in Belarus, Curt von Gottberg. According to the historian Paul R. Bartrop, at least 30,000 Belarusian civilians were killed under Dirlewanger's orders; while other estimates put it at around 200 villages destroyed and more than 120,000 people killed. Dirlewanger also personally maintained a group of five to six sex slaves, who were typically aged between 14 and 18, selecting these girls from civilian populations during "anti-partisan" operations in the Soviet Union. Jewish girls that Dirlewanger raped were later executed on his orders so that they could not testify about the crimes he had committed. Despite Himmler being aware of Dirlewanger's reputation and record, he was awarded the German Cross in Gold on 5 December 1943, for his unit's actions such as during Operation Cottbus (May–June 1943), during which Dirlewanger reported 14,000 alleged partisans killed. Himmler himself still noted the brutality of Dirlewanger, stating "The tone in the regiment is, I may say, in many cases a medieval one with cudgels and such things. If anyone expresses doubts about winning the war he is likely to fall dead from the table."

In his August 1943 report to the Nazi ideology chief Alfred Rosenberg, Wilhelm Kube, the Generalkommissar for Generalbezirk Weißruthenien, complained about the effects that Dirlewanger and others had in Belarus:

The name of Dirlewanger plays a particularly fatal role here, because this man consciously does not take into account any political needs during his ruthless extermination expedition against the peaceful population. In view of the methods often used, reminiscent of the excesses of the Thirty Years' War, the assurances of the German civil administration about the desired cooperation of the Belarusian people look like a lie. When women and children are shot en masse or burned alive, there is no longer a semblance of humane conduct of war.

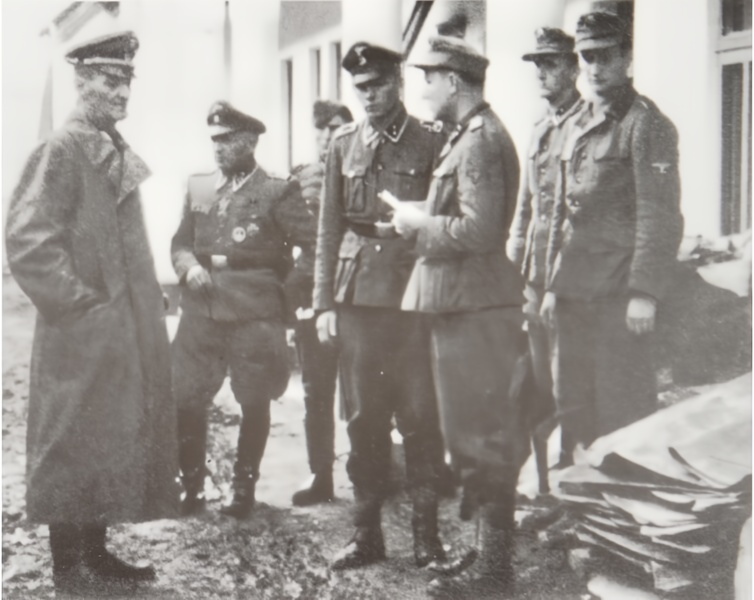
SS-Obersturmbannführer Dirlewanger and battalion staff outside of their headquarter in Lohoisk, 1943

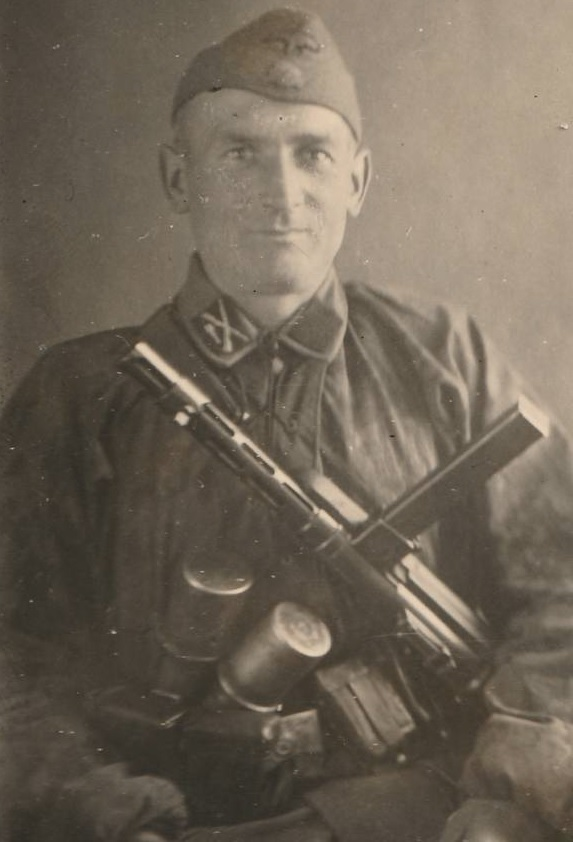
SS-Grenadier Karl Johannes Jung. A career criminal who was transferred to the SS-Sonderbataillon Dirlewanger for probation service.

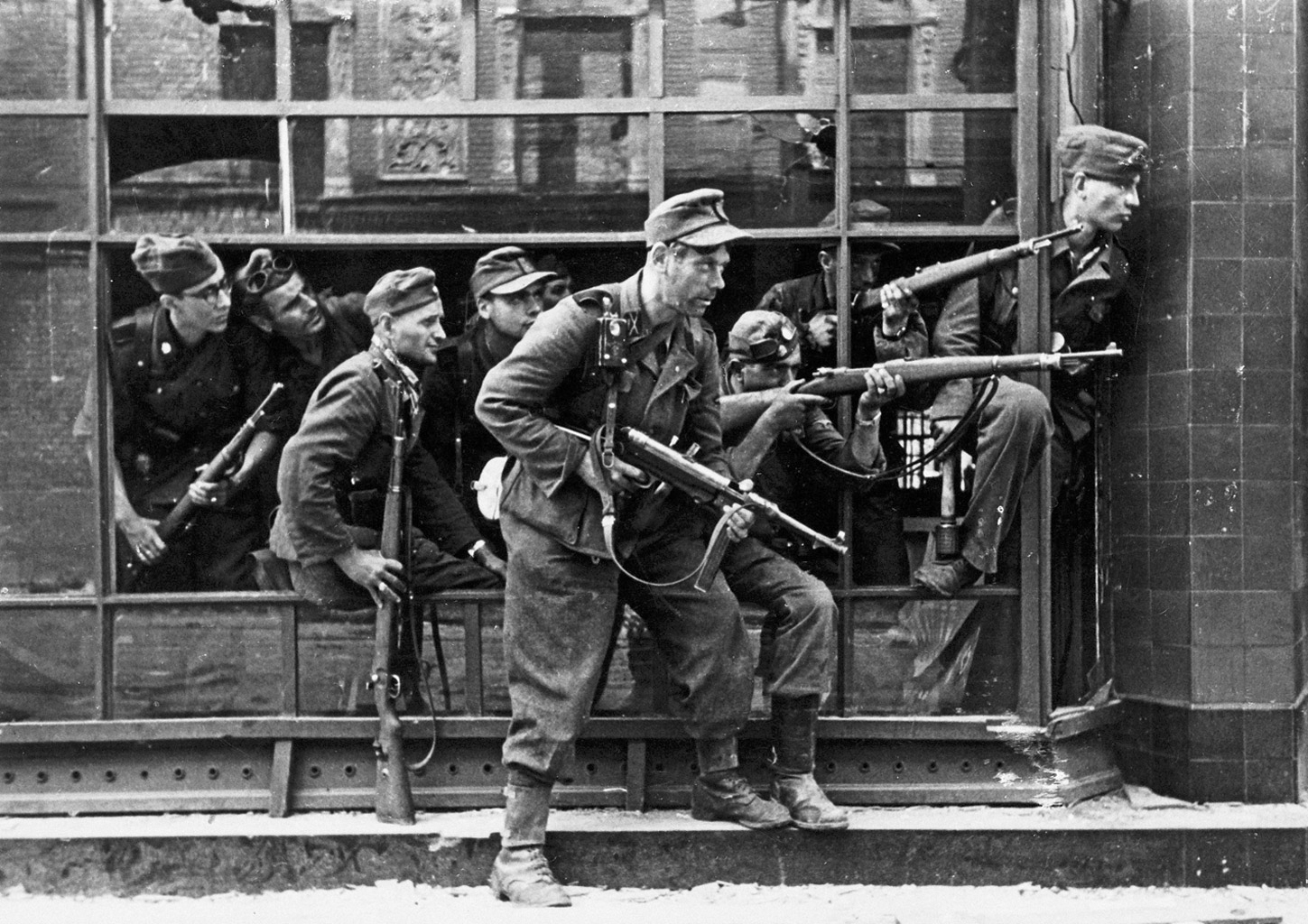
Members of the 2nd Battalion "Kampfgruppe Steinhauer" SS-Sonderregiment "Dirlewanger" in central Warsaw in 1944

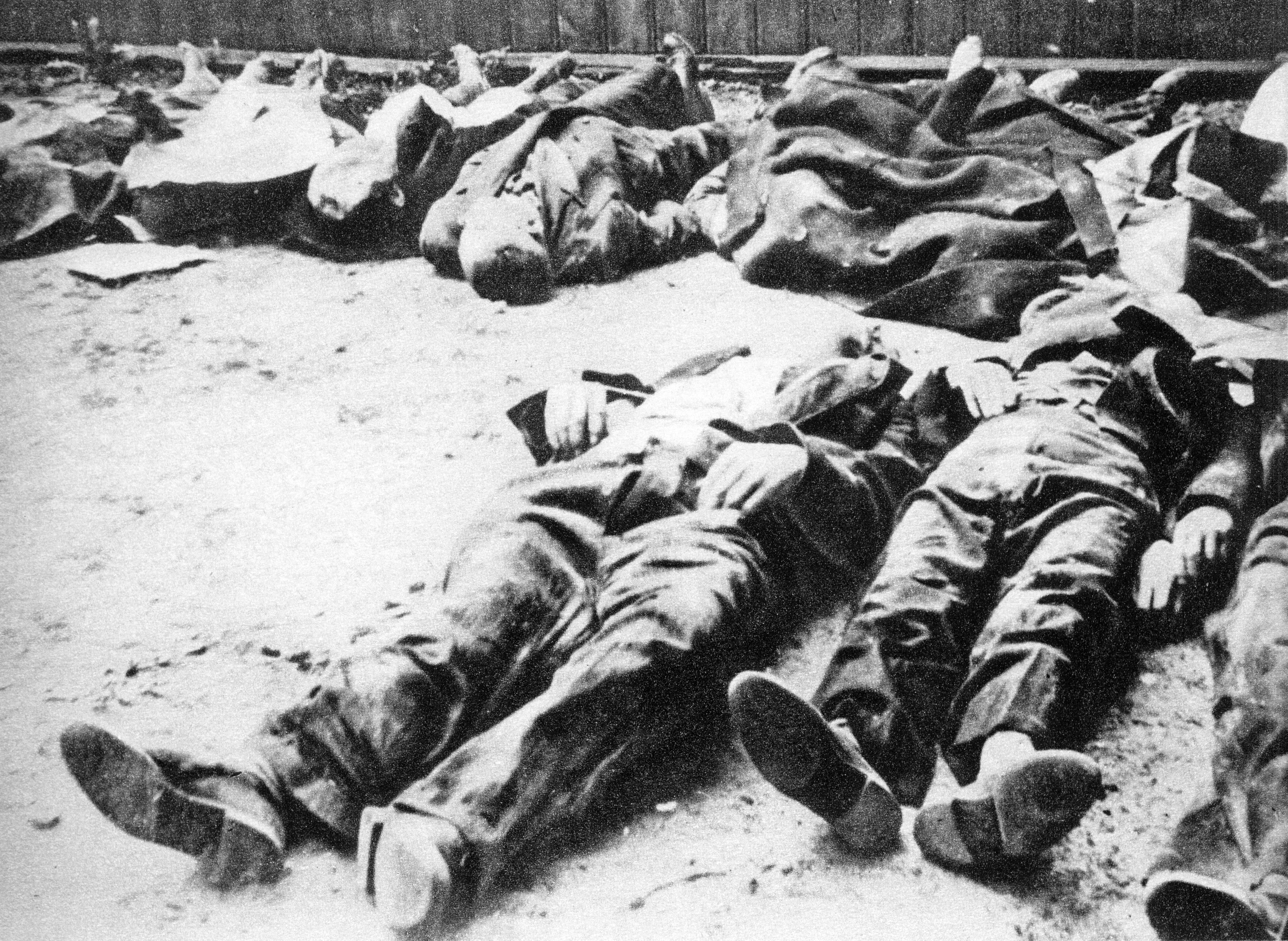
Polish civilians murdered in the Wola massacre in Warsaw, August 1944

In the early summer of 1944, during Operation Bagration, his Sonderregiment suffered heavy losses while fighting against the regular forces of the Red Army. Its remnant managed to retreat back to Poland. There, it was then hastily rebuilt and reformed as a Kampfgruppe formation under the command of SS-Gruppenführer Heinz Reinefarth and used in the suppression of the Warsaw Uprising, fighting first against the Polish insurgents since early August and later also helping to defeat the Polish People's Army's attempt to help Warsaw through a bridgehead in late September. Here, Dirlewanger, again using human shields and his other notorious methods from Belarus, gained further reputation for his brutality, becoming known in Poland as the "Executioner of the Warsaw Uprising". During early August, the Kampfgruppe Dirlewanger participated in the Wola massacre, together with Reinefarth's collection of police and security SS units systematically exterminating tens of thousands of residents of the Wola district of Warsaw. SS-Brigadeführer Ernst Rode, Erich von dem Bach-Zelewski's chief of staff, testified post-war that Dirlewanger received a handwritten order from Himmler. The order, issued in Hitler's name, instructed Dirlewanger to destroy Warsaw and granted him the authority to "kill anyone he wished, as he pleased". The role of Dirlewanger in the beginning days of the massacre may have been limited, and Dirlewanger himself may not have arrived until 7 August. According to Snyder, Dirlewanger burned three of Wola's hospitals with patients inside, while the nurses were "whipped, gang-raped and finally hanged naked, together with the doctors" to the accompaniment of the drinking song "In München steht ein Hofbräuhaus". Later, his men "drank, raped, and murdered their way through Warsaw's Old Town, slaughtering civilians and fighters alike without distinction of age or sex." There, again, thousands of wounded in hospitals were shot and set on fire with flamethrowers, and the soldiers "burned prisoners alive with gasoline, impaled babies on bayonets and stuck them out of windows and hung women upside down from balconies."

During his time in Warsaw, Dirlewanger acquired a translator by the name of Dr. Kryńska, who gained insight into Dirlewanger. He described Dirlewanger as totally believing in the "racial mission to 'cleanse' the east." He further noted that Dirlewanger was "extremely greedy" and that he "looted incessantly". The stolen property was systematically forwarded to his own warehouse in Germany, which already held goods looted from Belarus.

The brutality of Dirlewanger himself was further described by Mathias Schenck, a Belgian national who was serving in the area as a German Army combat engineer: "There is also that small child in Dirlewanger’s hands. He took it from a woman who was standing in the crowd in the street. He lifted the child high and then threw it into the fire. Then he shot the mother." According to Schenck, Dirlewanger also had a habit of hanging people every Thursday, whether it be Poles or his own men, often being the one to kick the chair out from underneath them. He described witnessing the massacre of children at an orphanage:

We blew up the doors, I think of a school. Children were standing in the hall and on the stairs. Lots of children. All with their small hands up. We looked at them for a few moments until Dirlewanger ran in. He ordered to kill them all. They shot them and then they were walking over their bodies and breaking their little heads with butt ends. Blood and brain matter streamed down the stairs. There is a memorial plaque in that place stating that 350 children were killed. I think there were many more, maybe 500.

Alarmed by reports coming from the regular German Army commander in Warsaw, General Nikolaus von Vormann, the Army High Command chief General Heinz Guderian appealed directly to Adolf Hitler himself to have Dirlewanger immediately removed from the city. Guderian was supported by SS-Obergruppenführer Erich von dem Bach-Zelewski, the overall commander of the forces pacifying Warsaw (and Dirlewanger's own former superior officer in Belarus), who described Dirlewanger as having "a typical mercenary nature". Hermann Fegelein, a member of Hitler's entourage and a liaison officer of the Waffen-SS, confirmed the allegations and described Dirlewanger's men as "real hoodlums". His opinion prompted Hitler to order Himmler to deal with the situation regarding Dirlewanger as well as another notorious commander in Reinefarth's grouping, Bronislav Kaminski. The latter's force of Russian collaborators, the Russian People's Liberation Army, deemed out-of-control, was indeed withdrawn outside Warsaw and the disgraced Kaminski along with some of his staff were assassinated by the Gestapo in a secret purge. Nothing, however, happened to Dirlewanger, probably due to his continued protection by Berger. The units commanded by Dirlewanger and Kaminksi are generally described as having committed the worst crimes during the Warsaw Uprising, though historian Timothy Snyder describes the behaviour of Dirlewanger's unit as even worse. Historian Douglas E. Nash cites an estimate according to which Dirlewanger and his unit killed at least 12,500 and up to 30,000 people in Warsaw, mostly non-combatants or captives. Another estimate is around 100,000 people murdered by Dirlewanger's unit, primarily in Belarus and Poland. For its part, treated by Reinefarth's staff and Dirlewanger himself as disposable urban assaults troops, the Kampfgruppe Dirlewanger suffered extremely heavy losses, in two months losing 315 percent of its initial strength (2,733 casualties compared to 865 men and 16 officers originally sent into the city), having been continuously replaced by constant reinforcements of new convict soldiers. It emerged from Warsaw as a Sturmbrigade, by then with only a few of the 50 members of the original "poacher" hard core group still alive in addition to Dirlewanger. In recognition of his bloody work to crush the uprising, Dirlewanger received his final promotion, to the rank of SS-Oberführer, on 12 August 1944. In October, he was awarded the Knight's Cross of the Iron Cross, approved by Hitler and recommended for it by his superior officer in Warsaw, Reinefarth; after the war, Reinefarth lied about his role in Warsaw, denying Dirlewanger had been under his command and even publicly denying having been a member of the SS, and was never punished.

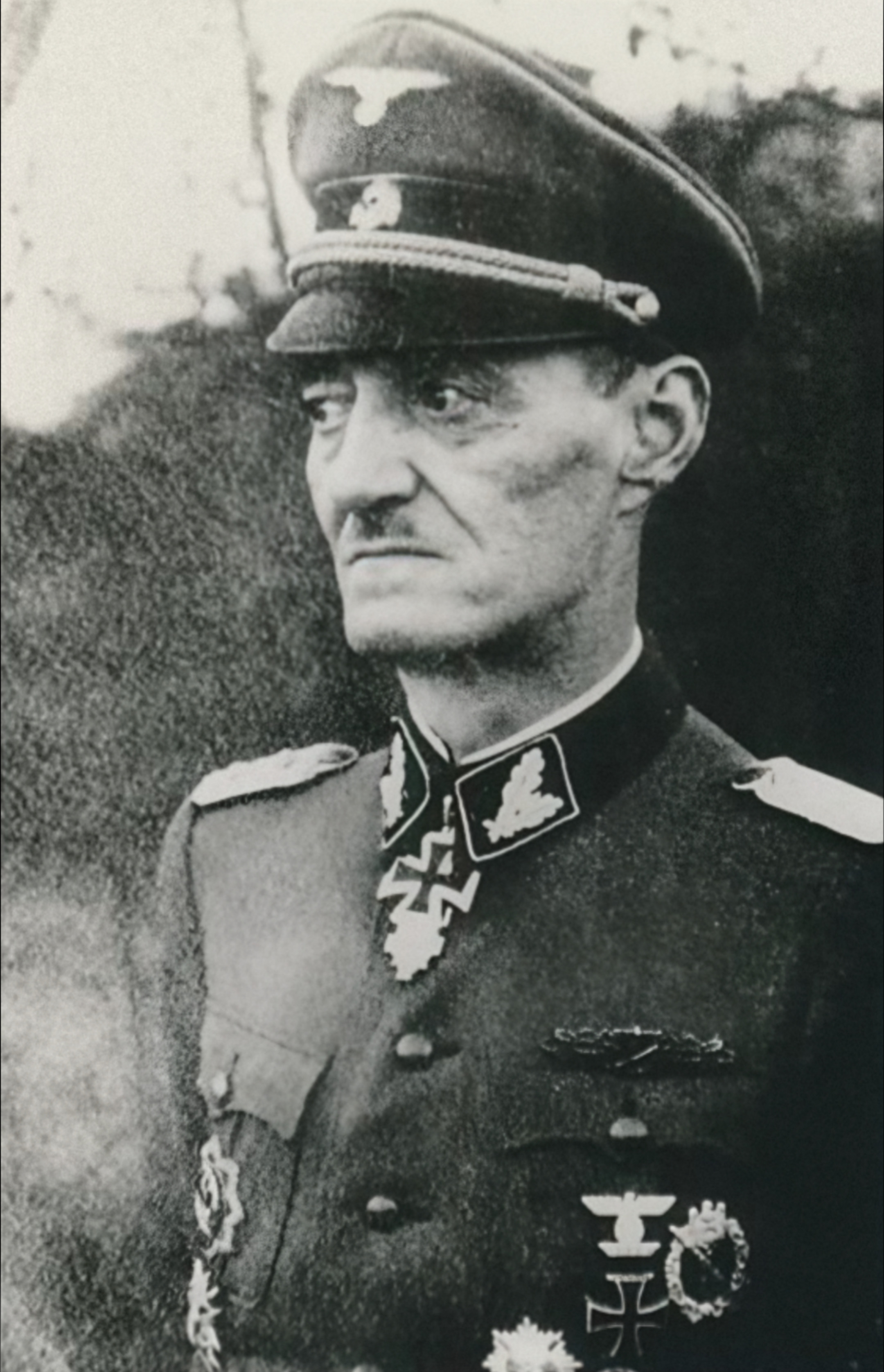
SS-Oberführer Oskar Dirlewanger after receiving the Slovak War Victory Cross following the suppression of the Slovak National Uprising. Banská Bystrica, 31 October 1944.

Dirlewanger then led his men in joining the efforts to put down the Slovak National Uprising in October 1944, where similar atrocities were committed. During its activation and counter-insurgency operations in Slovakia, the brigade engaged in widespread criminal misconduct, including looting, rape, and selling weapons to partisans, actively destabilizing the region and drawing harsh condemnation from other SS commanders. Despite being tasked with security, the brigade's extreme depredations against the local population were so severe that some officers claimed the Dirlewanger troops acted "worse than partisans." Eventually, he and his men were posted to the front lines of Hungary, where his brigade were quickly defeated on 15 December 1944 during the battle of Ipolysag, and then to eastern Germany to continue fighting against the advancing Red Army. In February 1945, the unit was expanded again by Himmler's order and redesignated as the 36th Waffen Grenadier Division of the SS. On February 15, Dirlewanger was seriously wounded in action while fighting against Soviet forces near Guben in Brandenburg and sent to the rear. It was his 12th and final combat injury. Without Dirlewanger's leadership, his unit began to disintegrate despite attempts to reorganize it, virtually ceasing to exist by late April. On 22 April, Dirlewanger himself deserted and went into hiding.

== Death ==
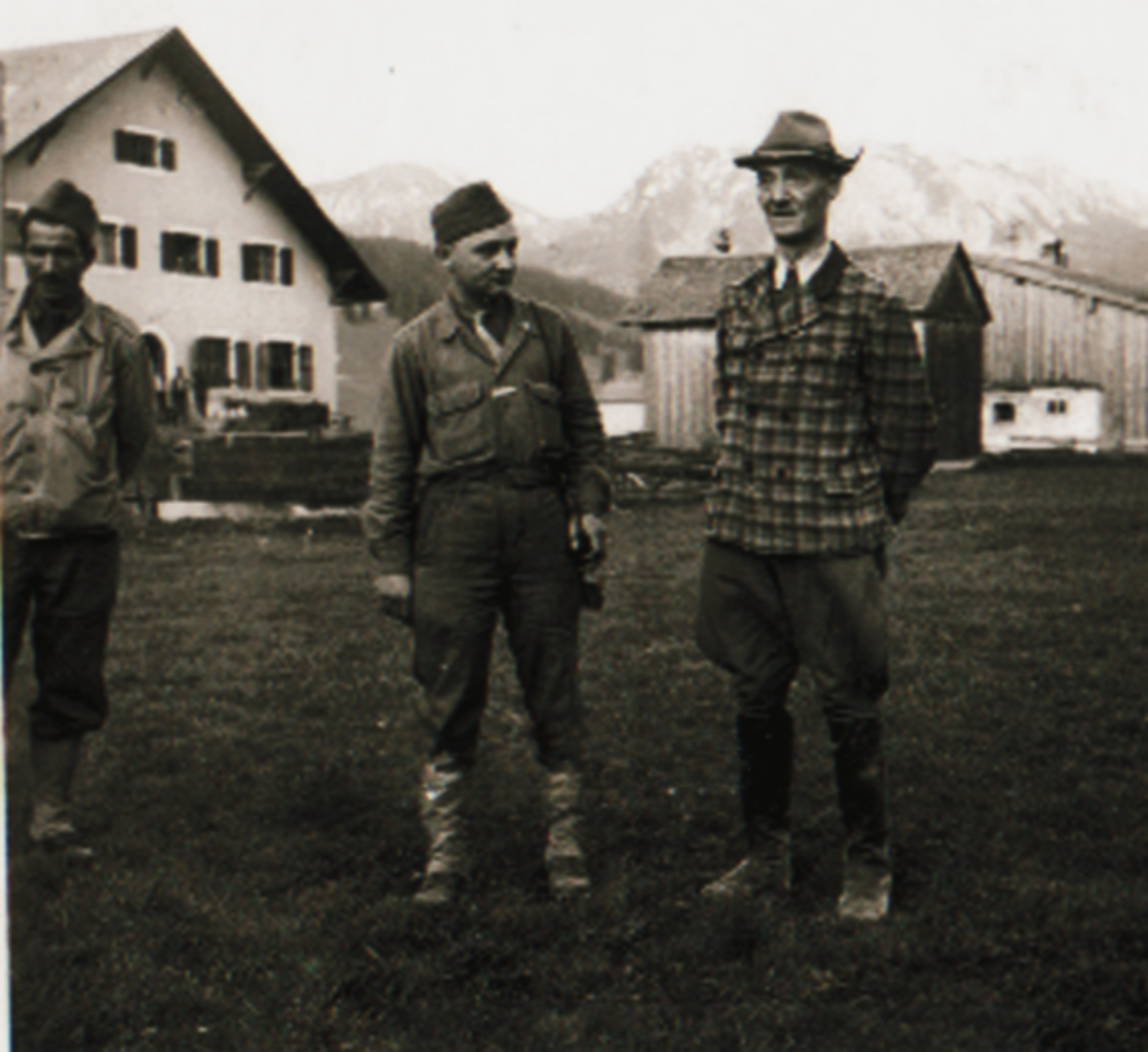
Dirlewanger (right) after his arrest by French colonial troops from the 2/5th Moroccan Rifle Regiment

On 1 June 1945, Dirlewanger was arrested by the French occupation zone authorities near the German town of Altshausen in Upper Swabia. At the time of his capture, Dirlewanger was wearing civilian clothes, using a false name, and hiding in a remote hunting lodge. He was recognised by a Polish Jewish former Stary Dzików concentration camp inmate and brought to a nearby detention centre.

Dirlewanger reportedly died around 5–7 June 1945 in a prison camp at Altshausen as a result of ill treatment (officially from natural causes). There are numerous conflicting reports of the nature of his death: the French said that he died of a vascular collapse and was buried in an unmarked grave; or he was beaten to death by armed Poles, presumably former forced labourers or former French military prisoners (of Polish origin); or Polish soldiers in French service (29^{e} Groupement d'Infanterie polonaise); or former inmates and prison guards.

According to political scientist Martin A. Lee, as well as historians Angelo de Boca and Mario Giovana, Dirlewanger survived the war and subsequently lived in Egypt tutoring the guards who provided security to the president Gamal Abdel Nasser. Likewise, Benjamin Netanyahu has written that, alongside hundreds of other Nazi officials, Dirlewanger fled to Egypt, where he became a bodyguard to Nasser. Peter Levenda, quoting different sources, believes that following his exile in Egypt he had converted to Islam. These theories and reports were proven false after the exhumation of Dirlewanger's remains in 1960, verifying his death in 1945 as a result of "the brutal torture by Polish guards" (Polnischen Wachmannschaften, otherwise unidentified and still mysterious to this day), yet have continued nevertheless.

=== Investigation ===
The rumours about Dirlewanger still being alive circulated around Altshausen and across all of Germany. Althausen's mayor, Franz Sproll, was forced to react, especially since Oskar Stammler, editor-in-chief of Revue, filed a complaint against Dirlewanger. Sproll then requested that the presumed grave where Dirlewanger had been buried be exhumed to prevent public unrest. However, according to Schwäbische Zeitung, the exhumation request was declined by the public prosecutor's office, which stated that it held no significant value. Half a year later, the public prosecutor's office decided to approve the request and had actually been investigating the case since April 1960.

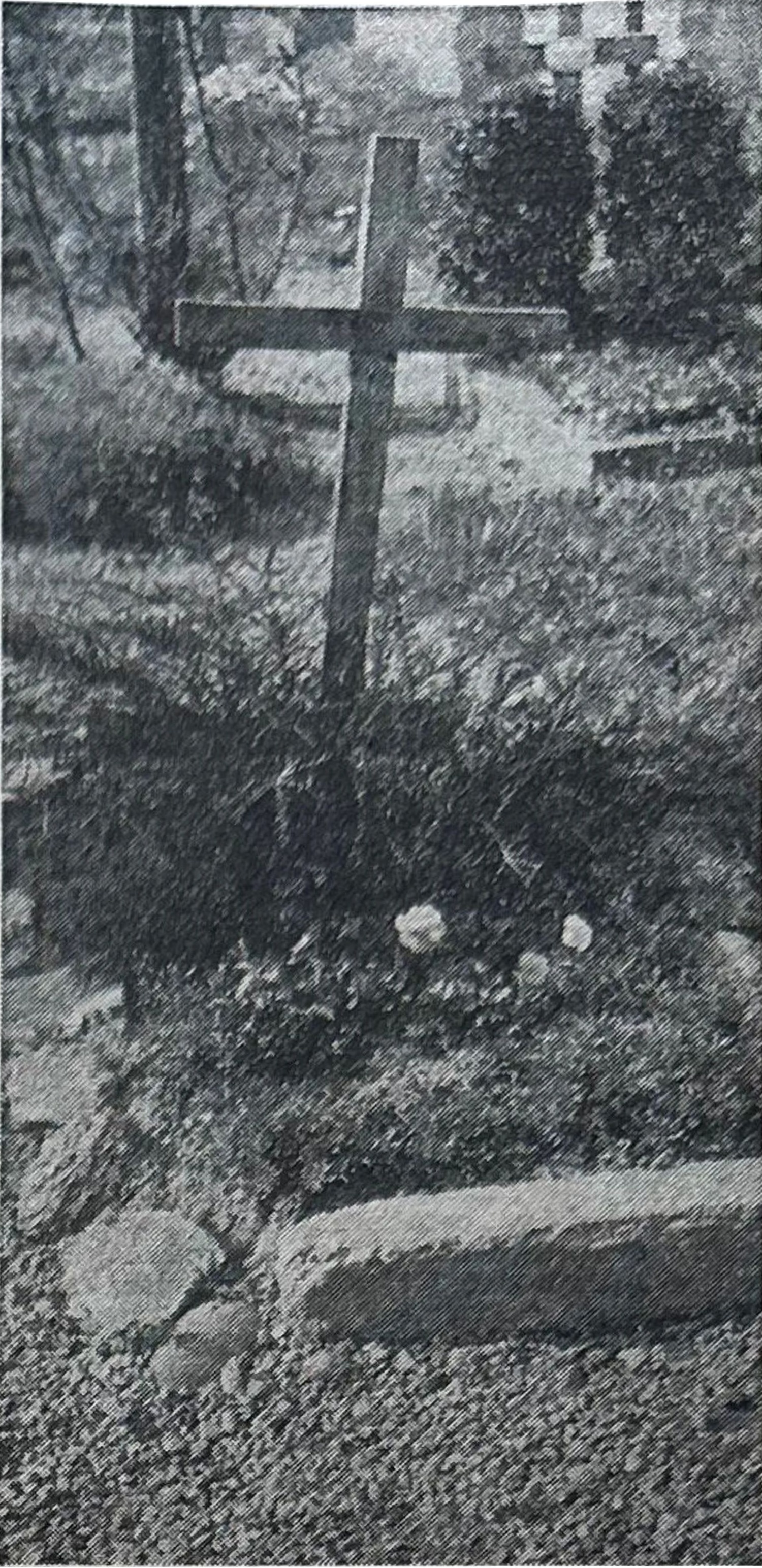
Dirlewanger's grave in November 1960

The senior public prosecutor, Zoller, who was investigating the case, visited every gravestone at the Altshausen cemetery, stone by stone, and summoned witness after witness in search of more clues about Dirlewanger's existence. Several of Dirlewanger's siblings, including Paul and Elfriede Dirlewanger, were questioned. They all testified that they had not heard any news from Dirlewanger in over 15 years. Dirlewanger's former dentist, Dr. Kissling, stated that he had fitted Dirlewanger with gold teeth, which would likely be found during the exhumation later. In addition, the public prosecutor's office documented 11 war injuries sustained by Dirlewanger—including an injury to his left hand, a bullet wound to his right foot during World War I, and a gunshot wound to the head in 1921. This information was considered crucial in determining whether the skeletal remains in the grave truly belonged to Dirlewanger. It was later revealed during the exhumation that the skeletal remains had been forcefully placed into the coffin. The skeleton was to be examined by forensic pathologists under the chairmanship of Professor Dr. Weyrich in Freiburg. The team of forensic pathologists conducted a detailed examination of the skeleton over a period of approximately three weeks. In their final report, they stated that, based on comparisons between eyewitness descriptions, documented war injuries, and available photographs with the condition of the exhumed remains, there was strong evidence to conclude that the skeleton recovered from the grave in Altshausen belonged to Dirlewanger. Archival records suggest that it then remained in the custody of the Institute of Forensic Medicine in Freiburg at least until the end of 1962, two years following the exhumation.

== Awards and ranks ==
- Iron Cross (1914) 2nd Class (28 August 1914) and 1st Class (13 July 1916)
- Württemberg Bravery Medal in Gold (4 October 1915)
- Wound Badge (1914) in Gold (30 April 1918)
- Hindenburg Cross with Swords (1935)
- NSDAP Service Award (1 April 1939)
- Spanish Cross of Military Merit (4 June 1939)
- Clasp to the Iron Cross (1939) 2nd Class (24 May 1942) and 1st Class (16 September 1942)
- Wound Badge (1939) in Gold (9 July 1943)
- German Cross in Gold (5 December 1943)
- Close Combat Clasp in bronze (19 March 1944)
- Bandit-warfare Badge in Silver (1944)
- Knight's Cross of the Iron Cross (30 September 1944)
- Slovak War Victory Cross (31 October 1944)

The table below lists the ranks held by Dirlewanger during the period of 1940–1945, along with the corresponding dates of promotion:

Ranks	Date of Promotion
SS-Obersturmführer der Reserve (lieutenant)	1 July 1940
SS-Hauptsturmführer der Reserve (captain)	1 August 1940
SS-Sturmbannführer der Reserve (major)	9 November 1941
SS-Obersturmbannführer der Reserve (lieutenant colonel)	12 May 1943
SS-Standartenführer der Reserve (colonel)	19 March 1944
SS-Oberführer der Reserve (senior colonel)	12 August 1944

== Legacy ==
=== Assessment ===
Despite being an accomplished soldier who was considered brave, Dirlewanger is invariably described as an extremely cruel man by historians and researchers. As such, he has been called "a psychopathic killer and child molester" by Steven J. Zaloga, "a professional killer, fully malefic" by Richard Rhodes, "a sadist and necrophiliac" by Bryan Mark Rigg, "an expert in extermination and a devotee of sadism and necrophilia" by J. Bowyer Bell, and a "sadistic, amoral alcoholic" by Knut Stang, who also stated that Dirlewanger was regarded as perhaps Nazi Germany's "most extreme executioner". Jesús Hernández wrote of the unit that "It is difficult to find a military unit that would commit so many brutal acts, showing such a degree of savagery, as the one commanded by Dirlewanger". The unit is considered the most infamous in Belarus and Poland, and arguably the single worst military unit in modern European history based in terms of sheer criminality.

Richard C. Lukas described Dirlewanger as "one of those degenerates who, in saner days, would have been court-martialed out of the German army", and "a sadist whose brutality was well known". Nikolaus Wachsmann called him "one of the most odious characters in the pantheon of SS villains". Chris Bishop called Dirlewanger the "most evil man in the SS" as well as "perhaps the most sadistic of all commanders of World War II". Christian Ingrao stated that Dirlewanger's unit committed the worst atrocities of the Second World War. Timothy Snyder stated that Dirlewanger's force committed more atrocities than any other unit involved in the creation of what the Germans termed the "dead zones" (Tote Zonen) in Belarus, adding that "in all the theaters of the Second World War, few could compete in cruelty with Oskar Dirlewanger". Historian Tim Heath wrote that Dirlewanger was "a man whom many describe as one of the most evil and depraved figures not only within the Nazi Third Reich, but throughout history itself". Douglas E. Nash similarly called Dirlewanger "one of the most heinous criminals in military history", and Alexandra Richie labeled Dirlewanger "the very face of evil", even noting that while the murder of partisans and civilians in Byelorussia (Belarus) was widespread, it was Dirlewanger who earned a singular, notorious distinction even during that horrific period. He has been called "one of the greatest genocidal perpetrators the world has ever known" and "an exceptional sadist whose cruelty knew no bounds."

Samuel W. Mitcham Jr described Dirlewanger as "a sexually perverted drunkard who enjoyed performing unnatural acts with the dead bodies of his victims, especially the younger ones." Alan Clark wrote that Dirlewanger's crimes against "Polish girls are hardly printable even today [i.e. 1965], combining as they did the indulgence of both sadism and necrophilia." According to Heath, "Dirlewanger was without any doubt one of the most evil, sadistic and sexually depraved individuals in the Third Reich. His appetite for alcohol, rape, sadism and violence shocked even the most hardline Nazis." Heath, however, expressed scepticism towards the accusations of necrophilia, saying that despite Dirlewanger's career being characterized by "child rape, murder, perversion, sadism and alcoholism," there has been no proven evidence of necrophilia and that "one can only assume that such assumptions are the result of literary fabrication." Nevertheless, he declared Dirlewanger was "a living embodiment of evil and depravity and all the proof that anyone could need that monsters do exist."

=== Modern day ===
Wolfsbrigade 44, a German neo-Nazi group banned by the German government in December 2020, used "44" as code for "DD", short for "Division Dirlewanger".

In the Russian television mini-series Operation Deserter (2020), Dirlewanger was played by Ukrainian actor Vadim Lyalko.

In the Uzbek-Belarusian film Uzbek Woman (2022), Dirlewanger was played by Belarusian actor Yevgeniy Ivkovich.
