= Werner Hühner =

- Born: 13 August 1886
- Died: 19 February 1966 (aged 79)
- Military career
- Allegiance: Germany
- Branch: Army (Wehrmacht)
- Rank: Generalleutnant
- Commands: 8th Panzer Division; 61st Infantry Division; 416th Infantry Division
- Conflicts: World War II
- Awards: Knight's Cross of the Iron Cross

Werner Hühner (13 August 1886 – 10 February 1966) was a general in the armed forces of Germany during World War II who commanded several divisions. He was a recipient of the Knight's Cross of the Iron Cross.

== Awards and decorations ==
- Knight's Cross of the Iron Cross on 18 April 1943 as generalleutnant and commander of 61st Infantry Division

Military offices
Preceded by Generalmajor Erich Brandenberger	Commander of 8th Panzer Division; 8 December 1941 – 28 January 1942	Succeeded by Generalmajor Erich Brandenberger
Preceded by Generalmajor Franz Scheidies	Commander of 61st Infantry Division; 7 April 1942 – 1 February 1943	Succeeded by Generalleutnant Günther Krappe
Preceded by Generalleutnant Hans Brabänder	Commander of 416th Infantry Division; 1 June 1943 – 1 July 1943	Succeeded by Generalleutnant Kurt Pflieger
