= Żółte =

- Village
- Location within Poland
- Coordinates: 53°35′N 15°50′E
- Country: Poland
- Voivodeship: West Pomeranian
- County: Drawsko
- Gmina: Drawsko Pomorskie

Żółte [ˈʐuu̯tɛ] (German: Schilde) is a village in the administrative district of Gmina Drawsko Pomorskie, within Drawsko County, West Pomeranian Voivodeship, in north-western Poland. It lies approximately 6 km (4 mi) north of Drawsko Pomorskie and 85 km (53 mi) east of the regional capital Szczecin.

For the history of the region, see History of Pomerania.

== Notable residents ==
- Günther Krappe (1893–1981), general
