= Heinz Reinefarth =

German SS general (1903–1979)

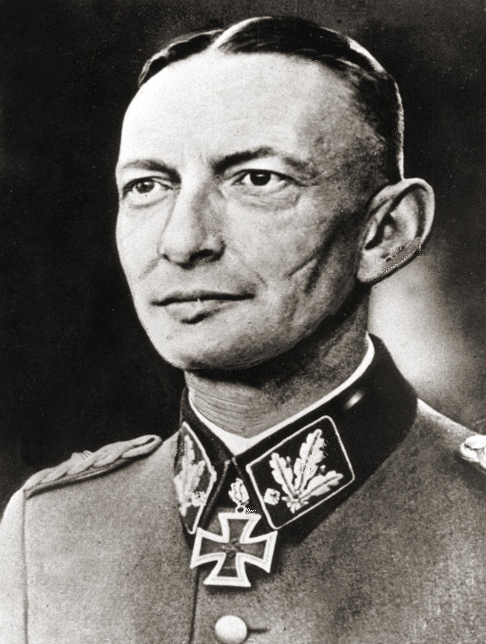
- Born: 26 December 1903; Gnesen, Kingdom of Prussia, German Empire
- Died: 7 May 1979 (aged 75); Westerland, Schleswig-Holstein, West Germany
- Military career
- Allegiance: Nazi Germany
- Branch: Waffen-SS
- Service years: 1933–45
- Rank: SS-Gruppenführer and Generalleutnant of the Waffen-SS and Police
- Unit: Kampfgruppe Reinefarth
- Commands: XIV SS Corps; XVIII SS Corps
- Conflicts: World War II: Operation Barbarossa; Battle of France; Warsaw Uprising
- Awards: Knight's Cross of the Iron Cross with Oak Leaves
- Other work: Politician and judge

Heinrich "Heinz" Friedrich Reinefarth (26 December 1903 – 7 May 1979) was a German SS commander during World War II and government official in West Germany after the war. During the Warsaw Uprising of August 1944 his troops committed numerous atrocities. After the war, Reinefarth became the mayor of the town of Westerland, on the isle of Sylt, and member of the Schleswig-Holstein Landtag. Polish demands for extradition were never accepted, and Reinefarth was never convicted of any war crime.

== Early years ==
Reinefarth was born on 26 December 1903 in Gnesen (Gniezno), Province of Posen. After he and his family moved to Cottbus, Reinefarth became sympathetic to right-wing politics and a supporter to Adolf Hitler. After finishing the gymnasium in 1922, he studied law at the University of Jena. He became a member of the student fraternity (this was the origin of the "Schmiss" – German for "dueling scar" – on his left cheek). He graduated in 1927 and passed the 1st degree state exams. Until 1930 he completed his application at the local court in Jena and was promoted to judge. On 1 August 1932, he joined the Nazi Party and received party identification card 1,268,933. In December of the same year, he joined the SS.

== World War II ==
Shortly before the outbreak of World War II, Reinefarth was conscripted as a reserve Feldwebel. For his actions during the invasion of Poland he received the 2nd Class Iron Cross. He took part in the 1940 campaign against France, for which he was awarded the Knight's Cross of the Iron Cross. On 20 April 1942, he was promoted to SS-Brigadeführer, the equivalent of Generalmajor in the Wehrmacht.

After promotion to brigadier, Reinefarth was appointed as General Inspector of SS in the Protectorate of Bohemia-Moravia. In September 1943, he was transferred to Berlin where he served in the Ministry of Order Police (Hauptamt Ordnungspolizei). On 29 January 1944, Reinefarth was assigned to be SS and Police Leader in Reichsgau Wartheland (Polish Poznań Voivodeship annexed by Germany in 1939). On 1 August, he was promoted to SS-Gruppenführer.

=== Warsaw Uprising ===
After the outbreak of the Warsaw Uprising, Reinefarth was ordered to organise a military unit consisting of personnel from various security units and head for Warsaw. Upon arrival, his forces (Kampfgruppe Reinefarth) were included in the Korpsgruppe von dem Bach of General Erich von dem Bach-Zelewski who was ordered by Heinrich Himmler to quell the rebellion. From 5 August 1944, Reinefarth's group took part in mass murders in the undefended Wola area.

==== Murder of civilians ====
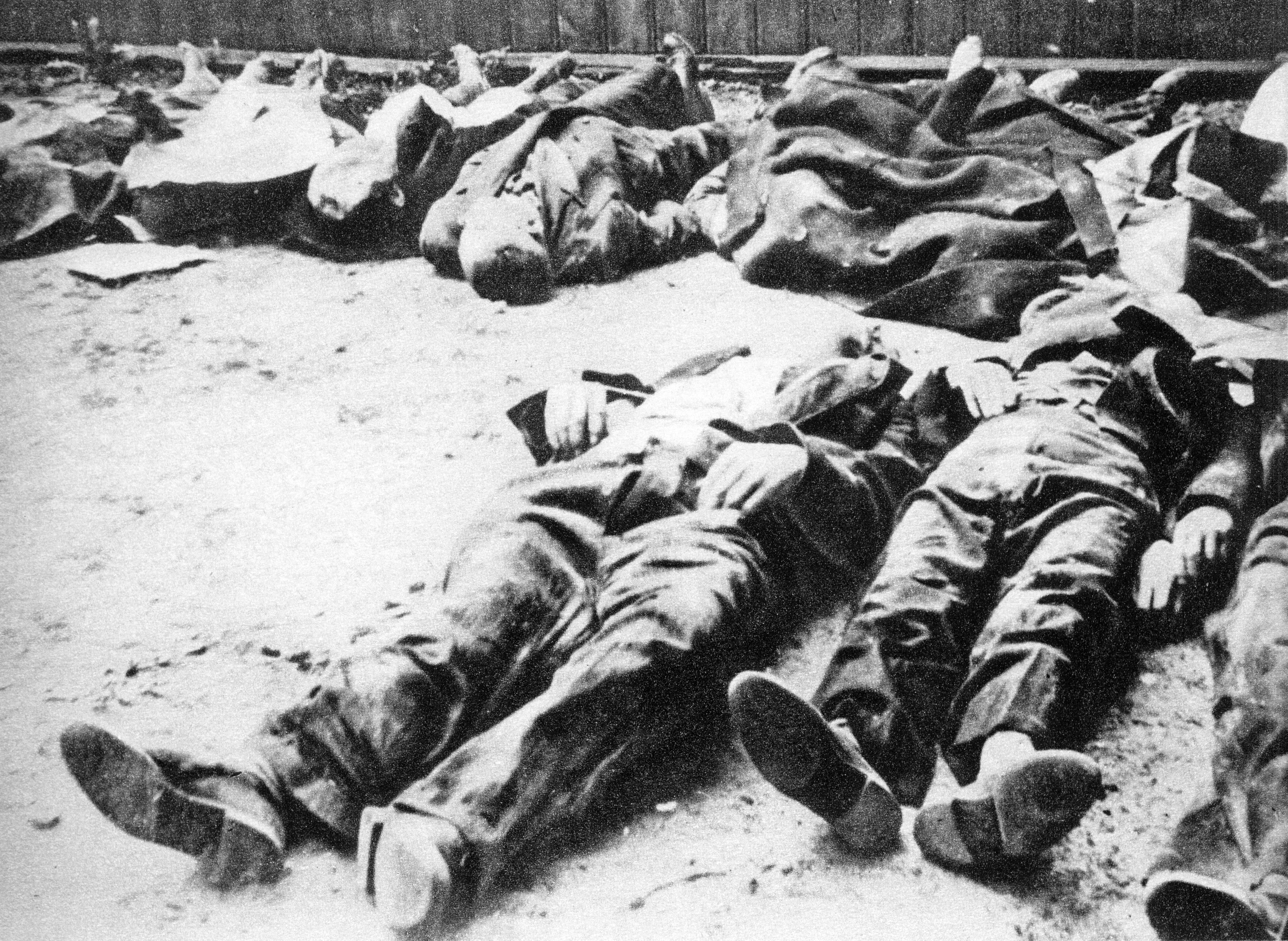
Polish civilians murdered in the Wola massacre. Warsaw, August 1944.

In two days, the units of Reinefarth, which included the notorious SS-Sonderregiment Dirlewanger under SS-Oberführer Oskar Dirlewanger, murdered approximately 60,000 civilian inhabitants of Warsaw in what is known as the Wola massacre. In one of his reports to the commander of the German 9th Army Reinefarth stated that "we have more prisoners than ammunition to kill them". After securing the Wola area, his troops took part in heavy fighting against the Armia Krajowa in the Old Town. In September, his forces were transferred to attack the boroughs of Powiśle and Czerniaków, where they committed further atrocities, including killing of POWs and wounded found in military hospitals. In all 150,000–200,000 Polish civilians were killed during the uprising. For his actions during the Warsaw Uprising Reinefarth was awarded the Oak Leaves to his Knight's Cross of the Iron Cross on 30 September 1944.

=== Later war activity ===
In November 1944, Reinefarth was given command over the XIV SS Corps on the Upper-Rhine and in December 1944 over the XVIII SS Corps in the central Oder river area. Between January and March 1945, he commanded the defence of "Festung Küstrin" (Kostrzyn nad Odrą). He declined to defend it to the last man and Hitler found fault with the way he withdrew his troops. Himmler, acting on Hitler's order, had Reinefarth arrested at the end of March 1945. Later he was sentenced to death by a military court. However, the sentence was not carried out, and he continued to command those of his troops that managed to leave the fortress. He moved his troops to the west and was captured by the Americans.

== Postwar ==
After World War II, Polish authorities demanded Reinefarth's extradition. However, the British and American authorities of occupied West Germany repeatedly refused extraditing him on grounds of security reasons. Reinefarth had by then secretly been recruited by the Counterintelligence Corps of the United States Army for consultation on Soviet military tactics. After the Nuremberg trials he was arrested for war crimes, but a local court in Hamburg released him shortly afterwards on the grounds of lack of evidence. Reinefarth went on to live a normal life. In December 1951, he was elected mayor of Westerland, the main town on the island of Sylt. There, Reinefarth rebuilt the town and turned Westerland into a tourist destination.

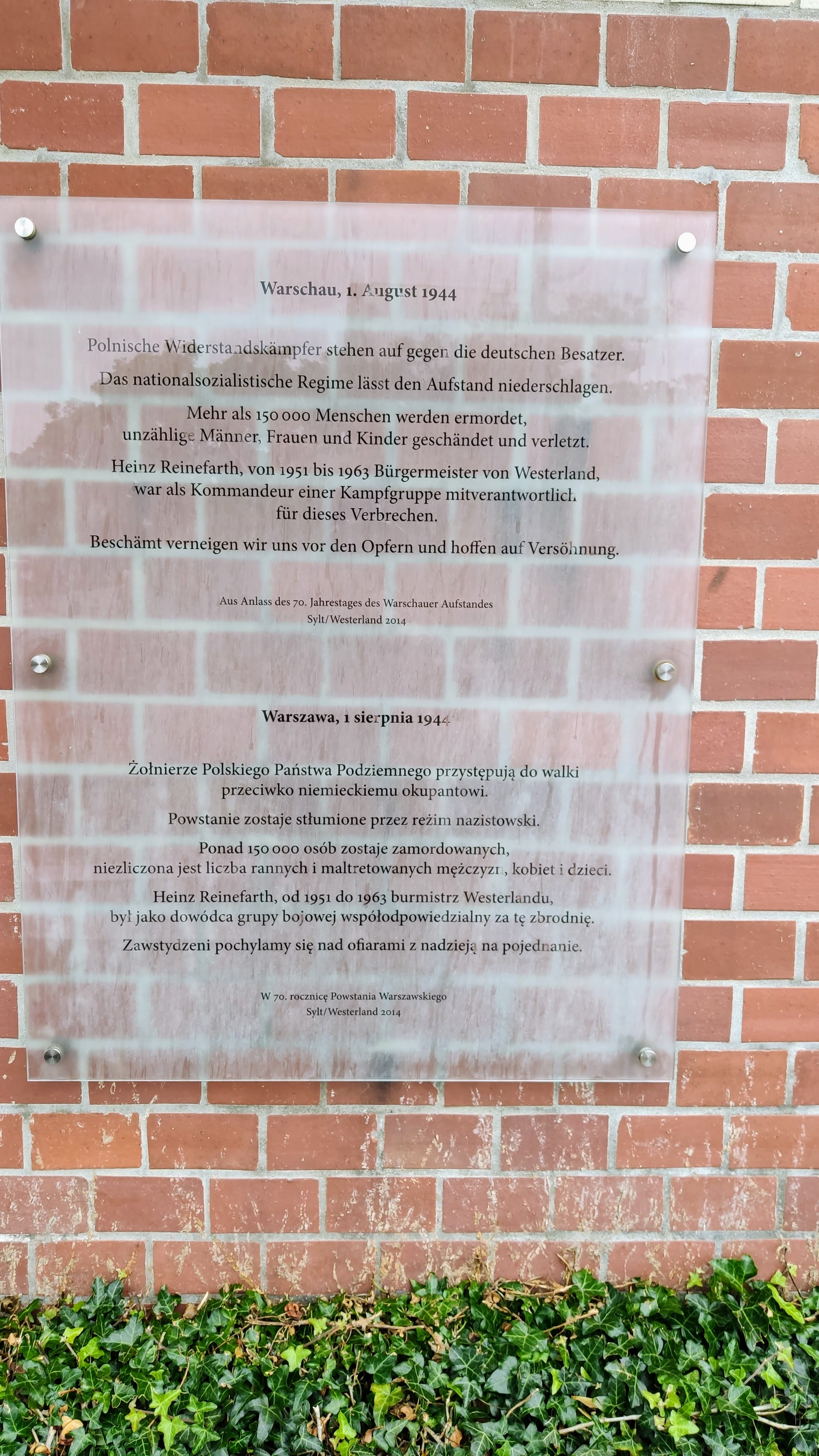
Memorial plaque commemorating the Warsaw Uprising at Westerland Town Hall on Sylt (inaugurated in 2014)

In 1962 Reinefarth was elected to the Landtag of Schleswig-Holstein. After his term ended in 1967, he worked as a lawyer. Despite numerous demands by the Polish People's Republic, he was not extradited as the German courts had ruled that there was no evidence of him committing any crimes. He was considered not guilty in the eyes of the law and the federal government, and received a general's pension upon retirement. Reinefarth died on 7 May 1979 in his mansion on Sylt. In his obituary, written by the city's administration, it stated, "His successful work for the city of Westerland will remain unforgettable."

== Legacy ==
In 2014, the local authorities of Westerland raised a memorial table remembering Polish victims of Reinefarth. A local SPD member, Ernst Wilhelm Sojan, who was present at the ceremony had campaigned since the 1960s to raise awareness of acts committed by Reinefarth but said that he was always met with a "wall of silence". The regional Schleswig-Holstein government issued a special statement expressing regret that Heinz Reinefarth had been allowed to work as politician in the region. Polish President Bronislaw Komorowski praised the authorities of Sylt for attempting to deal with its past.

== Awards ==
- Iron Cross (1939) 2nd Class (25 September 1939) & 1st Class (28 May 1940)
- Knight's Cross of the Iron Cross with Oak Leaves
  - Knight's Cross on 25 June 1940
  - 608th Oak Leaves on 30 September 1944 as SS-Gruppenführer and Generalleutnant of the Police, and commander of a Kampfgruppe in the Korpsgruppe von dem Bach

== Films ==
"Holiday on Sylt" 1957 by the Eastern German film director Andrew Thorndike.

== See also ==
- List SS-Gruppenführer
- Planned destruction of Warsaw
