= Franz Scheidies =

German general

- Born: 22 December 1890
- Died: 7 April 1942 (aged 51)
- Military career
- Allegiance: Nazi Germany
- Branch: Army
- Service years: 1905–42
- Rank: Generalmajor
- Commands: 61st Infantry Division
- Conflicts: World War II
- Awards: Knight's Cross of the Iron Cross with Oak Leaves

Franz Scheidies (22 December 1890 – 7 April 1942) was a general in the Wehrmacht of Nazi Germany during the Second World War and a recipient of the Knight's Cross of the Iron Cross with Oak Leaves. Scheidis was killed by a Soviet sniper on 7 April 1942.

== Awards ==
- Clasp to the Iron Cross (1939) 2nd Class (19 September 1939) & 1st Class (3 October 1939)
- Knight's Cross of the Iron Cross with Oak Leaves
  - Knight's Cross on 5 August 1940 as Oberstleutnant and commander of Festungs-Infanterie-Regiment "C" (Divisions Stab z.b.V. 444)
  - 43rd Oak Leaves on 31 December 1941 as Oberst and commander of Infanterie-Regiment 22

Military offices
Preceded by General of Infantry Siegfried Haenicke	Commander of 61. Infanterie-Division; 27 March 1942 – 7 April 1942	Succeeded by Lieutenant General Werner Hühner
