= Günther Krappe =

Günther Ernst Karl Krappe
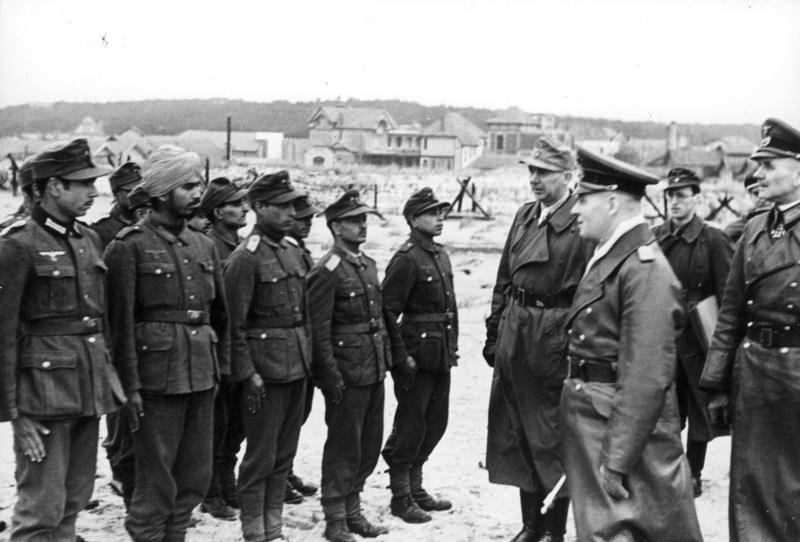
- Hermann Meyer-Rabingen (right) inspecting the Indian Legion with Generalfeldmarschall Erwin Rommel (center) and Legion commander Lieutenant Colonel Kurt Erich Krappe (left; 15 July 1899 – 25 October 1969), Günther's younger brother.
- Born: 13 April 1893; Schilde, district Dramburg, Province of Pomerania, Kingdom of Prussia, German Empire
- Died: 31 December 1981 (aged 88); Altena, North Rhine-Westphalia, West Germany
- Relatives: ∞ 1920 Ingeborg Weyland; 3 children
- Military career
- Allegiance: German Empire; Weimar Republic; Nazi Germany
- Branch: Prussian Army; Imperial German Army; Freikorps; Reichswehr; German Army
- Service years: 1912–1945
- Rank: Generalleutnant
- Commands: 61st Infantry Division; X SS Corps
- Conflicts: World War I World War II
- Awards: Knight's Cross of the Iron Cross

Günther Ernst Karl Krappe (13 April 1893 – 31 December 1981) was a German officer in the Second World War. He commanded the 61st Infantry Division. On March 5, 1945, in the village of Wollchow (where his estate was located) near Szczecin, Krappe was captured by soldiers of the 10th Polish Infantry Regiment from the 4th Infantry Division. He remained in captivity until March 1, 1949.

== Career ==
Entered Army Service (25 September 1912)
Fahnenjunker in the 34th Fusilier-Regiment (25 September 1912 – 1914)
Platoon & Company Leader (1914–1918)
Transferred into the 4th Reichswehr-Infantry-Regiment (1 October 1919 – 1922)
Adjutant of II. Battalion of the 4th Infantry-Regiment (1922–1 June 1926)
Company-Chief in the 4th Infantry-Regiment (1 June 1926 – 1 October 1930)
Chief Intelligence Officer (Ic) in the Staff of the 2nd Division (1 October 1930–1 October 1935)
Commander of II. Battalion of the 59th Infantry-Regiment (1 October 1935–1 October 1937)
Commander of III. Battalion of the 73rd Infantry-Regiment (1 October 1937–1 July 1939)
Commander of the 1st Supplemental-Regiment, Danzig (1 July 1939 – 1 October 1939)
Military-Attaché in Budapest (1 October 1939 – 30 April 1941)
Military-Attaché in Madrid (1 October 1941 – 1 December 1942)
Führer-Reserve OKH (1 December 1942 – 18 January 1943)
Division-Leader-Course, Panzer Troop School Wünsdorf (18 January 1943 – 12 February 1943)
Delegated with the Leadership of the 61st Infantry Division (12 February 1943 – 1 May 1943)
Commander of the 61st Infantry-Division (1 May 1943 – 11 December 1944)
Führer-Reserve OKH (15 December 1944 – 10 February 1945)
3rd Course for Commanding Generals (5 January 1945 – 1 February 1945)
Commander of the Oder-Korps/Korps "Oder" (1 February 1945 – 10 February 1945)

the order was from 2 February with effect from 1 February. He arrived at headquarters on 3 February at 2235 hours. He officially took over on 4 January 1945 at 0000 hours.

Delegated with the Leadership of X. Waffen SS-Corps der SS (10 February 1945 – 6 March 1945)
In Soviet captivity (6 March 1945 – 1 March 1949)
Released (1 March 1949)

== Promotions ==
- 25 September 1912 Fahnenjunker (Officer Candidate)
- 27 January 1913 Fahnenjunker-Unteroffizier (Officer Candidate with Corporal/NCO/Junior Sergeant rank)
- 20 May 1913 Fähnrich (Officer Cadet)
- 22 March 1914 Leutnant (2nd Lieutenant) with Patent from 23 March 1912
- 20 May 1917 Oberleutnant (1st Lieutenant)
- 1 February 1925 Hauptmann (Captain)
  - 1 April 1931 re-designated Rittmeister
  - 1 May 1933 re-designated Hauptmann
- 1 April 1934 Major
- 2 August 1936 Oberstleutnant (Lieutenant Colonel) with effect from 1 August 1936
- 31 March 1939 Oberst (Colonel) with effect and Rank Seniority (RDA) from 1 April 1939
- 16 October 1942 Generalmajor (Major General) with effect and RDA from 1 November 1942
- 1 October 1943 Generalleutnant (Lieutenant General)

== Awards and decorations ==
- Iron Cross (1914), 2nd and 1st Class
  - 2nd Class on 25 October 1914
  - 1st Class on 30 June 1917
- War Merit Cross, 2nd Class (BrKr2/BrK2) on 26 February 1918
- Honour Cross of the World War 1914/1918 with Swords on 30 October 1934
- Hungarian World War Commemorative Medal with Swords and Helmet on 25 April 1936
- Wehrmacht Long Service Award, 4th to 1st Class
  - 2nd Class on 2 October 1936
  - 1st Class on 30 September 1937
- Repetition Clasp 1939 to the Iron Cross 1914, 2nd and 1st Class
  - 2nd Class on 16 September 1939
  - 1st Class on 5 October 1939
- Danzig Cross, 1st Class
- War Merit Cross (1939), 2nd Class with Swords on 30 January 1943
- Knight's Cross of the Iron Cross on 11 April 1944 as Generalleutnant and Commander of the 61st Infantry Division.

== Sources ==
- German Federal Archives: BArch PERS 6/686 and PERS 6/300054

Military offices
Preceded by Generalleutnant Werner Hühner	Commander of 61. Infanterie-Division; February 1943 – April 1943	Succeeded by Generalleutant Gottfried Weber
Preceded by Generalleutant Gottfried Weber	Commander of 61. Infanterie-Division; May 1943 – December 1943	Succeeded by Generalmajor Joachim Albrecht von Blücher
Preceded by Generalmajor Joachim Albrecht von Blücher	Commander of 61. Infanterie-Division; February 1944 – March 1945	Succeeded by none
