= 416th Infantry Division =

- German: 416. Infanterie-Division
- Active: December 20, 1941 – May 1945
- Country: Nazi Germany
- Branch: Army
- Type: Infantry
- Size: Division
- Nickname: "Whipped Cream Division"
- Engagements: World War II: Western Front (1944-45); Western invasion of Germany; Battle of Aschaffenburg

The 416th Infantry Division was a German infantry division of World War II.

== Division History ==
The division was set up on December 20, 1941, with the headquarters in Braunschweig for the occupation of Denmark. From January 1942 the division was with the commander of the German troops in Denmark, from January to September 1944 with the Wehrmacht commander Denmark, in Aalborg.

The division had an average age of 38 years and was called the "Whipped Cream Division” due to the relative ease of the occupation, high food supply, and copious amount of dairy products. Denmark itself earned the nickname the Whipped Cream Front.

In March 1942, the two regiments became Landesschützen regiments (441 became Landesschützen-Regiment 930 and 443 became Landesschützen-Regiment 931). In the middle of the year these again became infantry regiments and then in mid-October 1942 grenadier regiments. In mid-January 1943, both regiments were transferred to Army Group Center on the Eastern Front. As a replacement was from the rear army areaHeeresgruppe Mitte pulled out two staffs from security regiments and six security battalions, which then formed two fortress infantry regiments for the division. Both regiments became grenadier regiments on August 1, 1943, with the III./712 being pulled out and not replaced until April 30, 1944 by Ost-Bataillon 662. At the end of April 1944, a third grenadier regiment was added to the division, which was called (Russian) Grenadier Regiment 714 from June 22, 1944 and was now part of the III. (Russian)/712 existed.

On October 4, 1944, the order was given to use the division on the Western Front, and the unit was used in western Germany (Saar-Palatinate area) from then on. During this period, the division had its command post in the district of Keuchingen near Mettlach. The four Russian battalions remained in Denmark. In 1945, Grenadier Regiment 714 became Grenadier Regiment 1604 (Russian) of the newly established Russian Brigade 599. As a replacement, a German regiment was set up, which formed the I. from the III./713 and from the end of December 1944, to avoid confusion with the still existing (Russian) Grenadier Regiment 714, carried the number 774. From October 1944 to March 1945 the division was in the Saar Palatinate with the 1st Army in the LXXXII Army Corps, then transferred to the 7th Army within the Army Corps, then fought in the Hunsrück.

In late March/early April 1945, the division fought with 7,000 men in the Battle of Aschaffenburg. In May 1945, the remainder of the division was taken prisoner of war by the US near Traunstein in Bavaria. The division pastor, Wilhelm Wöste, led the capitulation negotiations.

== Structure ==
=== December 1941 ===
- Infanterie-Regiment 441 with three battalions, made up of Landesschützen-Bataillon 982, 233 and 542
- Infanterie-Regiment 443 with three battalions, made up of Landesschützen-Bataillon 360, 426 and 507
- Artillery Battalion 416 with 1st to 3rd light and 4th heavy batteries
- Division Units 416

=== January 1943 ===
- Fortress Infantry Regiment 712 with three battalions, formed from Security Regiment Staff 27 and Security Battalions 244, 323 and 743
- Fortress Infantry Regiment 713 with three battalions, formed from Security Regiment Staff 62 and Security Battalions 481, 483 and 578
- Artillery Detachment 416
- Division Units 416

=== April 1944 ===
- Grenadier Regiment 712 with three battalions
- Grenadier Regiment 713 with three battalions
- Grenadier Regiment 714 (East) with three battalions, formed from East Battalions 603, 653 and 667
- Artillery Detachment 416
- Division Units 416

=== Aug 1944 ===
- Grenadier Regiment 712 with two battalions
- Grenadier Regiment 713 with two battalions
- Grenadier Regiment 774 with two battalions
- Artillery Battalion 416, from November 1944 Artillery Regiment 416 with four batteries
- Panzerjäger-Kompanie, from the end of December 1944 Panzerjäger-Abtachment
- Intelligence company, from the end of December 1944 intelligence department
- Pioneer Company, from the end of December 1944 Pioneer Section
- from December 1944: Divisional Fusilier Company 416

== Commanders ==
- Generalleutnant Hans Brabanden : from formation to June 1943
- Generalleutnant Werner Huhn : June/July 1943
- Generalleutnant Kurt Pflug : from July 1943 until the end of the war
