= Wolfsbrigade 44 =

German far-right political group

Die Wolfsbrigade 44, or Die Sturmbrigade 44, was a German Neo-Nazi organization.

== History ==
The organisation was founded in 2016. In early December 2020, the group was banned by the federal government of Germany and law enforcement officials conducted a number of police raids on locations in three states in connection with the ban. The federal German government had also banned the group's symbols, such as a skull with two grenades that had the number 44 marked on them. It was the fourth German far-right group to be banned in 2020.

== Ideology and symbolism ==
According to The Times, Wolfsbrigade 44 members identified with a war criminal, Oskar Dirlewanger, whose brutality (rape, mass murder of children, and torture) was unusual even by the standards of the Waffen-SS.

The website associated with German television news programme Tagesschau described the group as wanting to end democracy in Germany and establish a system of government based on the Nazi regime. The group was reported to have referred to the modern German state as the "Jewish Republic".

== See also ==
- Censorship in Germany
- Far-right politics in Germany (1945–present)
- Order of Nine Angles
- Combat 18
- Atomwaffen Division
