= XIV SS Corps =

XIV SS Army Corps
- Generalkommando XIV. SS-Armeekorps
- Active: November 1944 – January 1945
- Country: Nazi Germany
- Branch: Waffen-SS

The XIV SS Corps (German: Generalkommando XIV. SS-Armeekorps) was a short-lived Waffen-SS corps-level headquarters formed to participate in Operation Northwind on the Upper Rhine in the winter of 1944-1945 during World War II.

== History ==
After his appointment as commander-in-chief of Army Group Upper Rhine, Heinrich Himmler formed the headquarters of the XIV SS Army Corps in November 1944. Because there were not enough combat units available, the corps consisted of only one division, the 553rd Volksgrenadier Division. The force acted as a reserve for the army group.

The corps was given the task of attacking and pinning U.S. Army units at Gambsheim at the start of Operation Nordwind, so that they could not be used as reinforcements against the main attack, which would be deployed more to the north.

In the night of 4 to 5 January 1945, the 553rd Volksgrenadier Division crossed the Rhine near Gambsheim, where the Moder and Zorn rivers merge. Because most U.S. units of VI Corps fought in the north and thanks to the help of the pro-German population, the Germans were able to quickly extend their bridgehead to Kilstett, Herrlisheim, and Offendorf.

General Alexander Patch, commander of the U.S. 7th Army, ordered the newly arrived 12th Armored Division to destroy the bridgehead on 8 January. This attack and a second attack on 13 January failed with heavy losses.

On 14 January 1945, the XIV SS Army Corps received the 3rd SS Panzer Battalion of the 10th SS Panzer Division "Frundsberg", led by SS-Brigadeführer Heinz Harmel. The experienced Harmel ignored the orders of his corps commander and launched an attack on 16 January 1945. His heavy German tanks destroyed a U.S. tank battalion and overran the accompanying armoured infantry. Despite this victory, the German attack stalled. Canals and drainage canals cut through the landscape and many German tanks got stuck or had mechanical problems.

On the southern edge, the 3rd French Infantry Division expelled the 553rd Volksgrenadier Division from Kilstett and by 21 January, the German offensive came to an end.

In the East, the Soviet Vistula–Oder offensive had broken out and several German units were sent from the West to the endangered Eastern Front. The headquarters of the XIV SS Army Corps were dissolved and the staff formed the X SS Corps that was sent to Pommern.

== Commanders ==
- SS-Gruppenführer Heinz Reinefarth: November 1944
- SS-Obergruppenführer Erich von dem Bach-Zelewski: December 1944 – January 1945

== Sources ==
- Lexikon-der-wehrmacht
- Axis History
- okh.it
