= X SS Corps =

X SS Army Corps
- Generalkommando X. SS-Armeekorps
- Active: January – March 1945
- Country: Nazi Germany
- Branch: Waffen-SS

The X SS Corps (German: Generalkommando X. SS-Armeekorps or Gruppe Krappe) was a short-lived Waffen-SS corps-level headquarters employed on the Eastern Front in 1945 during World War II.

== History ==
The X SS Corps headquarters was formed in January 1945 with the use of men and equipment provided by the disbanded XIV SS Corps headquarters (a temporary HQ unit employed during Operation Northwind). The corps was subordinated to the 11th SS Panzer Army in February 1945, and then to the 3rd Panzer Army in March. They were deployed in the vicinity of Dramburg, Pomerania. In February 1945, the X SS Corps controlled the 5th Jäger Division and the 402nd Division. Generalleutnant Günther Krappe took command of the corps on 10 February 1945. In March 1945, the corps also had the 163rd Infantry Division under its control.

In March 1945, the corps (and Korpsgruppe Tettau) were encircled by elements of the 1st Guards Tank Army, the 3rd Shock Army, and the Polish 1st Army in an area approximately 20 kilometres (12 mi) north of Dramburg. The two Soviet armies pushed against the pocket from the west and northwest while the Polish 1st Army drove from the south, east, and northeast, resulting in the destruction of the encircled German troops by 7 March 1945. On 8 March 1945, the Soviets announced the capture of Krappe and 8,000 men of the corps.

== Commanders ==
- SS-Obergruppenführer Erich von dem Bach-Zelewski: 26 January – 10 February 1945
- Generalleutnant Günther Krappe: 10 February – 7 March 1945
- SS-Standartenführer Herbert Golz: 7 March – 11 March 1945
