= 61st Infantry Division (Wehrmacht) =

- 61. Infanterie-Division
- Active: 16 August 1939 – 8 May 1945
- Country: Nazi Germany
- Branch: Army
- Type: Infantry
- Size: Division
- Engagements: World War II; Poland; Dunkirk; Battle for France; Riga; Baltic Islands; Tikhvin

The 61st Infantry Division (German: 61. Infanterie-Division) was a combat division of the German Army during the Second World War. Towards the end of the war, it became the 61st Volksgrenadier Division.

== Combat history ==
=== Poland ===
The 61st Infantry division was created just before the outbreak of conflict and took part in the invasion of Poland on 1 September 1939 as part of von Küchler's 3rd Army under Army Group North. It engaged in heavy fighting at the Battle of Mława, afterwards crossing the Narew River near Pułtusk. Fighting its way across the Bug River, it approached the Polish capital at Warsaw on 18 September and remained in the vicinity until the end of the campaign.

=== France 1940 ===
In December 1939 the division was shifted to the west and subsequently took part in the attack on Belgium on 10 May 1940 as a unit of 4th Army Corps. During the advance into Belgium the 61st divisions 151st Infantry Regiment linked up with German airborne troops assaulting Fort Eben-Emael on 11 May, the Belgian defenders surrendered the fortifications on the same day. The division also participated in the Battle of Dunkirk during the invasion of France. Loses in the western campaign were 348 killed, 1052 wounded, 106 missing The division served occupation duty in Brittany afterward.

=== The attack on the Soviet Union ===
In early 1941 it was transferred to East Prussia, and in June it joined in the invasion of the Soviet Union as part of 18th Army (again commanded by von Küchler and once again under Army Group North). The division participated in the occupation of Tallinn and the Moonsund Archipelago.

==== Attack on the Moonsund Archipelago ====
After the fall of Tallinn the Germans had to clear the Baltic Islands to get full and unhindered use of the sea lanes. Units of the 61st division were transported by the Navy to Saaremaa, the southern Island, see Operation Beowulf. The island was defended by 3rd Independent Brigade of the 8th Army of the Leningrad front, plus coastal artillery, and naval units. there were also a small number of fighter planes on the airport.

Most of the 60-mile-long island was cleared by 21 September by the 176th & 151st Infantry Regiments, except for the Sorve Peninsula. Here The Russian forces dug in and resisted stubbornly until 5 October. With the southern Island finally cleared the attack was extended to Hiiumaa, the northern Island on 12 October. Within 2 weeks the island was cleared and the Germans claimed 16.000 prisoners and to have captured 100 artillery pieces.

The way was open now for the Soviet Naval forces in the north to be bottled up in the Gulf of Finland, and the 61st Infantry was now available for redeployment.

It took part in the Siege of Leningrad and remained in the area until January 1944, after which the Soviet Krasnoye Selo–Ropsha and Kingisepp–Gdov offensives forced it back into Estonia where it fought in the Battle of Narva, particularly in the Narva Offensive (18–24 March 1944). Held in reserve, it was one of only two divisions considered "fully combat effective" by the Army Group North in July of that year.

The division was redesignated as 61st Volksgrenadier Division in October 1944, and continued fighting in the East under Army Groups North and Center. Evacuated to East Prussia, the division fought in the so-called Heiligenbeil pocket, caught between the advancing Soviets and the Frisches Haff. Once the "cauldron" collapsed in March 1945 the division was written off as a loss and its remaining assets were taken over by the 21st Infantry Division while the division staff was withdrawn to Königsberg, all falling into Soviet hands at the end of the war.

== Organization ==
Established in August 1939 as part of the second wave. It was mobilised in Wehrkreis 1, East Prussia, with its headquarters at Insterburg
The division had a standard early war infantry establishment. It had three infantry regiments of three infantry battalions, a gun company and an antitank company each. It had an artillery regiment of four battalions, containing in total nine batteries of 105mm light Field Howitzers and 3 batteries of 150mm heavy Field Howitzers. It also had a full reconnaissance battalion, which included 3 armoured cars. Its equipment was German, with a personnel establishment of 15,500 men. For mobility it had over 500 trucks, as well as other motor vehicles and motorcycles. It also had nearly 5,000 horses, and its soldiers marched into battle on foot.
In February 1940 the division gave up an infantry battalion and some artillery for the creation of the 291st Infantry division of the 8th wave, these units were recreated.

The 61st Infantry Division consisted of the following units in May 1940:

- 151st Infantry Regiment
- 162nd Infantry Regiment
- 176th Infantry Regiment
- 161st Artillery Regiment
- 161st Engineer Battalion
- 161st Reconnaissance Battalion
- 161st Anti-Tank Battalion
- 161st Signals Battalion
- 161st Supply Troops

In November 1940 the division gave up an Infantry battalion from each Infantry Regiment for the formation of the 336th Infantry Division of the 14th wave. The battalions were replaced. The division suffered very heavy casualties in the Russian campaign, especially in infantry, so by the summer of 1942 three of its infantry battalions were officially disbanded, each Infantry Regiment now only having two battalions. Also the anti-tank battalion and the reconnaissance were merged to produce a schnelle (fast) battalion.

By 1943 the division's composition had been somewhat altered to the following:

- 151st Grenadier Regiment
- 162nd Grenadier Regiment
- 176th Grenadier Regiment
- 161st Artillery Regiment
- 161st Engineer Battalion
- 161st Anti-Tank Battalion
- 161st Intelligence Battalion
- 161st Supply Troop Command

Once officially designated a Volksgrenadier Division in 1944, the unit was composed of the following:

- 151st Grenadier Regiment
- 162nd Grenadier Regiment
- 176th Grenadier Regiment
- 61st Fusilier Battalion
- 161st Artillery Regiment

== Commanders ==
The following officers commanded the 61st Infantry Division:

- August 1939 – March 1942: General of Infantry Siegfried Haenicke
- March 1942 – April 1942: Major General Franz Scheidies
- April 1942 – February 1943: Lieutenant General Werner Hühner
- February 1943 – April 1943: Lieutenant General Günther Krappe
- April 1943 – May 1943: Lieutenant General Gottfried Weber
- May 1943 – December 1943: Lieutenant General Günther Krappe (2nd time)
- December 1943 – February 1944: Major General Joachim Albrecht von Blücher
- from February 1944: Lieutenant General Günther Krappe (3rd time)

== Personnel ==
Thirty-seven of the division's personnel were Knight's Cross of the Iron Cross recipients, including commanders Siegfried Haenicke, Werner Hühner, Gottfried Weber (when commander of the 1st battalion of the 162nd Infantry Regiment), and Günther Krappe.
