= Battle of Aschaffenburg (1945) =

Battle between German and American armies

- Part of the Western Allied invasion of Germany in the Western Front of the European theatre of World War II
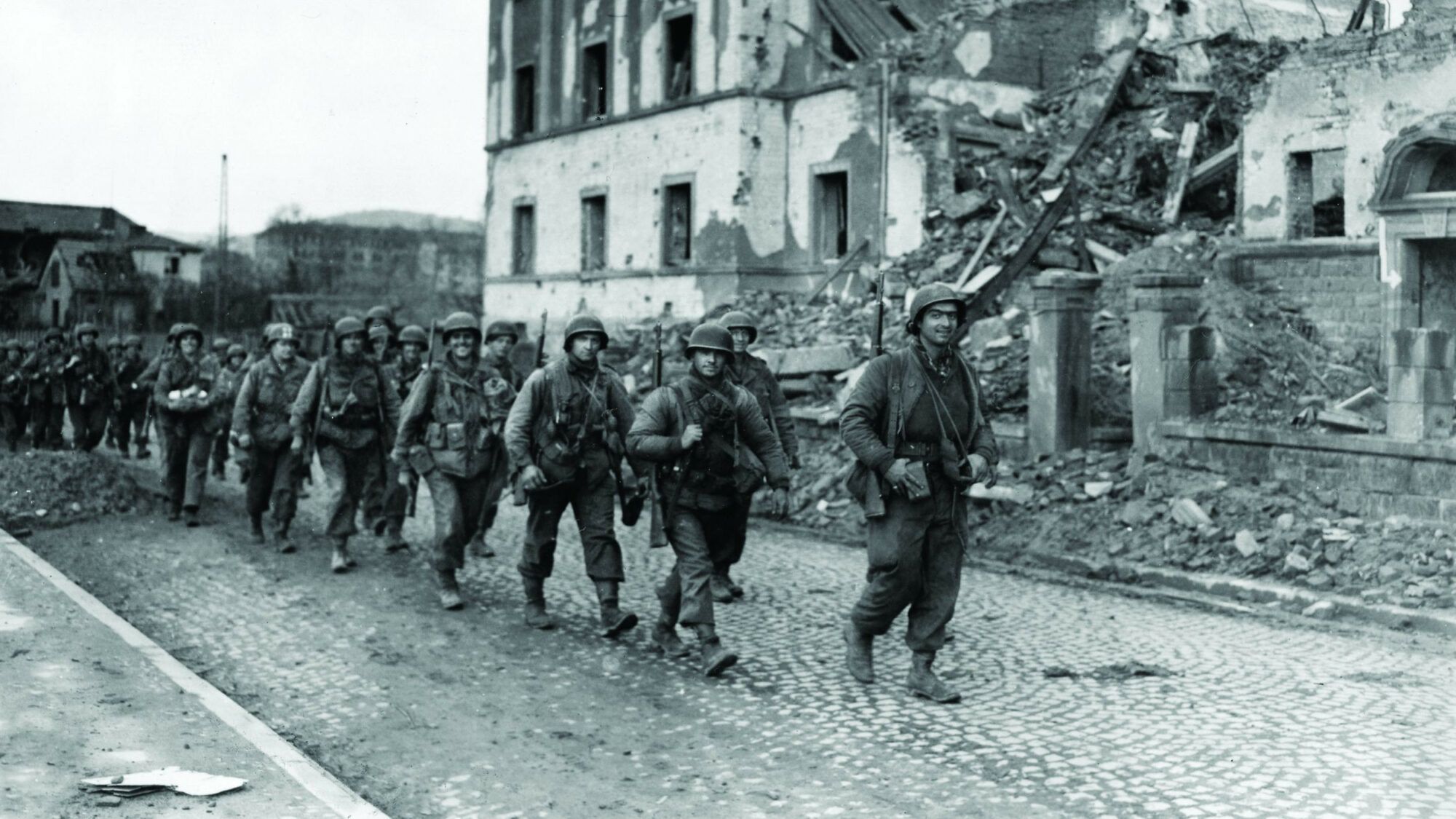
- American soldiers in Aschaffenburg
Date	25 March – 3 April 1945
Location	Aschaffenburg, Germany 49°58′32.66″N 9°8′31.21″E
Result	American victory

Belligerents
United States	(Nazi Germany) Germany

Commanders and leaders
George S. Patton; Alexander Patch	Emil Lamberth

Casualties and losses
3,000 KIA, WIA, MIA; 20+ tanks destroyed	1,620 KIA, WIA, MIA; 3,500 POW

The Battle of Aschaffenburg was a 10 day battle fought between the forces of the United States 7th Army and 3rd Army on one side, and Nazi Germany on the other during World War II.

== History ==
Upon Adolf Hitler's decree that the city be used as a Festungsstadt (fortress city) German armed forces, with support of the local populace, concentrated their defense of the Wetterau-Main-Tauber line in the strategically important city in an effort to repel the allied invasion of Germany. The battle posed an unexpected challenge to allied war planners in the late stages of the conflict and saw German leadership resorting to increasingly desperate attempts at motivating their personnel to continue the fight.

Following extensive urban combat with severe losses to the both sides, Major Emil Lamberth surrendered to LTC Felix L. Sparks at 9am on 3 April 1945 after hanging white flags from the damaged towers of Schloss Johannisburg. In his news conference of 7 April 1945, Secretary of War Henry L. Stimson noted: "There is a lesson with respect to [fighting to the end] in Aschaffenburg. There Nazi fanatics used the visible threat of two hangings to compel German soldiers and civilians to fight for a week."
