= Erich von dem Bach-Zelewski =

German politician and SS general (1899–1972)

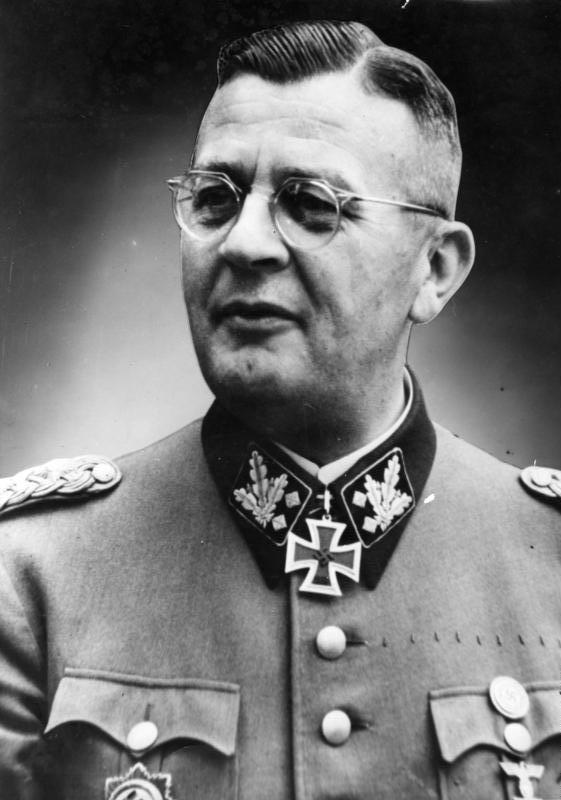
- Bach-Zelewski in 1944

Higher SS and Police Leader Central Russia (mainly Western Russia and Belarus)
- In office 22 June 1941 – 21 June 1944
- Preceded by: Position established
- Succeeded by: Curt von Gottberg (as HSSPF Rußland-Mitte und Weißruthenien)

Higher SS and Police Leader, Wehrkreis VIII
- In office 28 June 1938 – 20 May 1941
- Preceded by: Position established
- Succeeded by: Ernst-Heinrich Schmauser

Member of the Reichstag
- In office August 1932 – May 1945

Personal details
- Born: Erich Julius Eberhard von Zelewski; 1 March 1899 Lębork, Province of Pomerania, German Empire
- Died: 8 March 1972 (aged 73) Harlaching Hospital, Munich, Bavaria, West Germany
- Party: Nazi Party
- Spouse: Ruth Apfeld (m. 1922)
- Children: 6
- Parent(s): Otto Johannes von Zelewski; Amalia Maria Eveline

Military service
- Allegiance: German Empire; Weimar Republic; Nazi Germany
- Branch/service: Imperial German Army; Schutzstaffel; Waffen-SS
- Years of service: 1914–1945
- Rank: SS-Obergruppenführer and General of the Waffen-SS and Police
- Commands: Higher SS and Police Leader (HSSPF), Wehrkreis VIII; HSSPF, Army Group Centre Rear Area; Bandenbekämpfung Chief for occupied Europe; XIV SS Corps; X SS Corps
- Battles/wars: World War I; Silesian Uprisings; World War II; Nazi security warfare; Warsaw Uprising
- Awards: Knight's Cross of the Iron Cross; German Cross in Gold

Erich Julius Eberhard von dem Bach-Zelewski (born Erich Julius Eberhard von Zelewski; 1 March 1899 – 8 March 1972) was a German politician of Polish-Kashubian descent, military officer and high-ranking SS commander. During World War II, he was in charge of the Nazi security warfare against those designated by the regime as ideological enemies and any other persons deemed to present danger to the Nazi rule or Wehrmacht's rear security in the occupied territories of Eastern Europe. It mostly involved atrocities against the civilian population. In 1944, he led the brutal suppression of the Warsaw Uprising.

Despite his responsibility for numerous war crimes and crimes against humanity, Bach-Zelewski did not stand trial in the Nuremberg trials, and instead appeared as a witness for the prosecution. He was later convicted for politically motivated murders committed in Germany before the war and died in prison in 1972.

== Biography ==
=== Origins and family ===
Erich Julius Eberhard von dem Bach-Zelewski was born as Erich Julius Eberhard von Zelewski in Lębork on 1 March 1899 to Polish-Kashubian parents, Otto Johannes von Zelewski (1859–1911) and Elżbieta Ewelina Szymańska (born 1862 in Polish family in Toruń city from Kujawy region). His father, an officer and farmer, was of an impoverished Polish-Kashubian family of landed gentry with roots in Seelau. Erich's family came from the Polish nobility with their own coat of arms (Żelewski). Erich von Żelewski's grandfather was Franciszek von Żelewski, who married Ewa Kętrzyńska.

His uncle, Emil von Zelewski, died in 1891 as commanding officer of the Schutztruppe of German East Africa while fighting the Hehe. The Zelewski family had originally spoken Kashubian and Polish at home and for generations was connected with the Roman Catholic church in Linia, but as an adult Zelewski joined a Protestant church.

Since his father had to pay off several siblings, he sold the manor he inherited and became a traveling salesman. Zelewski and his six siblings therefore grew up in relative poverty in Biała Piska in East Prussia, where he attended an elementary school. When he was twelve, his father died, and the children were placed in foster families. Zelewski was taken in as the foster son of a landowner named Schickfuss in Łagiewniki.

Zelewski attended several high schools, in Wejherowo, Brodnica, and Chojnice.

=== First World War ===
The outbreak of the First World War came during the school summer holidays of 1914, while Zelewski was staying with his mother in Biała Piska. He was only fifteen, but in December 1914 he succeeded in enlisting in the Prussian Army, gaining some renown as its youngest volunteer. He served throughout the First World War. In 1915, he was wounded by a bullet in the shoulder and in 1918 suffered a poison gas attack.

He was awarded the Iron Cross, First Class. By the end of the war he had been promoted to Leutnant.

=== Interwar period ===
Following the armistice of November 1918, Zelewski remained in the Reichswehr and fought against the Polish Silesian Uprisings. In 1924, he resigned his army commission (or was discharged) and returned to his farm in Düringshof (now Bogdaniec in the Gorzów Wielkopolski county of Poland). He became a member of the German veterans' organization Der Stahlhelm and also joined the Deutschvölkischer Schutz- und Trutzbund, the largest, most active and most influential antisemitic organization in the Weimar Republic. Zelewski enrolled with the border guards (Grenzschutz) the same year.

Zelewski legally added "von dem Bach" to his family name on 23 October 1925. On 28 November 1940, he removed the "Zelewski" part of his surname because of its Polish-sounding origin. Bach-Zelewski manipulated his genealogy numerous times in his career to impress his superiors. A source of considerable embarrassment for him was that all three of his sisters had married Jewish men. After the war, he claimed under interrogation that this had ruined his reputation in the army, forcing him to leave the Reichswehr.

In July 1930, Bach-Zelewski left the Grenzschutz, and joined the Nazi Party (membership number 489,101). Bach-Zelewski joined the Schutzstaffel (SS) as member number 9,831 on 15 February 1931. He rose rapidly in the ranks and was promoted to SS-Brigadeführer on 15 December 1933. During this period he reportedly quarreled with his staff officer, Anton von Hohberg und Buchwald, and had him killed on 2 July 1934 during the Night of the Long Knives (for which he was convicted of manslaughter in 1961). Less than two weeks later, he was promoted to SS-Gruppenführer on 11 July 1934.

Bach-Zelewski was appointed to the Reichstag in August 1932 and was elected as a deputy from electoral constituency 5 (Frankfurt an der Oder) at the March 1933 election. He retained a Reichstag seat until the fall of the Nazi regime in May 1945, switching to constituency 7 (Breslau) at the March 1936 election. From February 1934, he served as commander of SS-Oberabschnitte (main district) "Nordost" in East Prussia, with headquarters in Königsberg. After a serious disagreement with East Prussian Gauleiter Erich Koch in February 1936, he was transferred to the command of SS-Oberabschnitte "Südost", based in Breslau. On 28 June 1938, he was also named the first SS and Police Leader (HSSPF) for Wehrkreis (military district) VIII (Silesia), a command he retained until 20 May 1941.

=== World War II ===
In November 1939, Reichsführer-SS Heinrich Himmler, in his capacity as Reich Commissioner for the Consolidation of German Nationhood, made Bach-Zelewski his deputy for East-Silesia (the Polish territories incorporated into Silesia in 1939). His duties included mass resettlement and the confiscation of Polish private property. By August 1940, some 18,000–20,000 Poles from Żywiec County were forced to leave their homes in what became known as the Action Saybusch (German name for Żywiec).

Bach-Zelewski provided the initial impetus for the building of Auschwitz concentration camp at the former Austrian and later Polish military barracks in the Zasole suburb of Oświęcim due to overcrowding of prisons. The location was scouted by his subordinate Oberführer Arpad Wigand. The first transport arrived at KL Auschwitz on 14 June 1940, and two weeks later Bach-Zelewski personally visited the camp.

==== Occupied Soviet Union ====
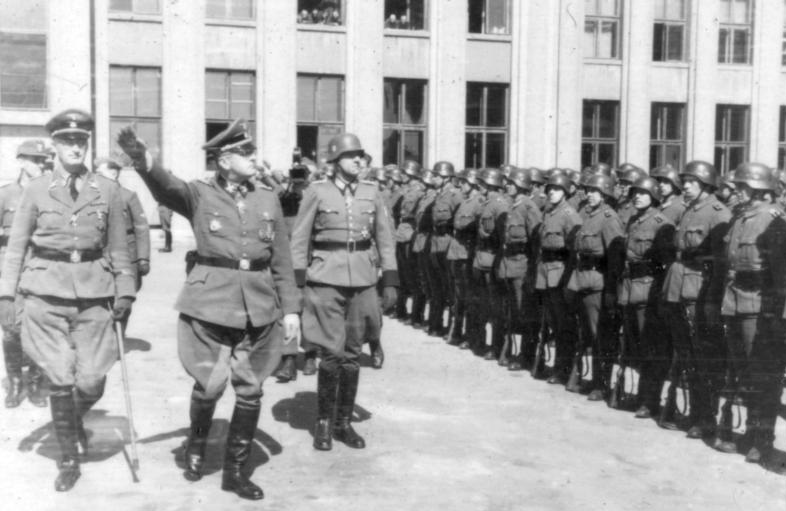
Bach-Zelewski in Minsk in 1943

On 22 June 1941 at the launch of Operation Barbarossa, Bach-Zelewski was appointed as HSSPF for "Russland-Mitte", chiefly in the territory of Belarus. From July to September 1941, he oversaw the murder of Jews in Riga and Minsk by the Einsatzgruppe B, led by Arthur Nebe, also visiting other sites of mass killings such as Białystok, Grodno, Baranovichi, Mogilev, and Pinsk. Bach-Zelewski regularly cabled to headquarters on the extermination progress; for example, the 22 August message stated: "Thus the figure in my area now exceeds the thirty thousand mark". At the end of 1941 the forces under Bach-Zelewski numbered 14,953 Germans, mostly officers and unteroffiziere, and 238,105 local "volunteers" (most war crime victims were murdered by local collaborators under German command).

In February 1942, Bach-Zelewski was hospitalized in Berlin for treatment of "intestinal ailments" stemming from opium abuse, and was described as suffering from "hallucinations connected with the shooting of Jews". Before resuming his post in July, Bach-Zelewski petitioned Heinrich Himmler for reassignment to anti-partisan warfare duty. He was promoted to SS-Obergruppenführer and General of Police on 9 November 1941.

In June 1942, Reinhard Heydrich, acting Reich-Protector of Bohemia and Moravia, was assassinated in Prague. Hitler chose Bach-Zelewski as his replacement, but Himmler protested that he could not be spared due to the prevailing military situation. Hitler relented and appointed Kurt Daluege to the position. Through 1943, Bach-Zelewski remained in command of "anti-partisan" units on the central front, a special command created by Hitler. He was the only HSSPF in the occupied Soviet territories to retain genuine authority over the police after Hans-Adolf Prützmann and Friedrich Jeckeln lost theirs to the civil administration.

==== Genocidal tactics ====
In June 1943, Himmler issued the Bandenbekämpfung (bandit fighting) order, simultaneously announcing the existence of the Bandenkampfverbände (bandit fighting formations), with Bach-Zelewski as its chief. Employing troops primarily from the SS police and Waffen-SS, the Bandenkampfverbände had four principal operational components: propaganda, centralized control and coordination of security operations, training of troops, and battle operations. Once the Wehrmacht had secured territorial objectives, the Bandenkampfverbände first secured communications facilities, roads, railways, and waterways. Thereafter, they secured rural communities and economic installations such as factories and administrative buildings. An additional priority was securing agricultural and forestry resources. The SS oversaw the collection of the harvest, which was deemed critical to strategic operations. Any Jews in the area were rounded up and murdered. Communists and people of Asian descent were murdered presumptively under the assumption that they were Soviet agents. Under Bach-Zelewski, the formations were responsible for the mass murder of 35,000 civilians in Riga and more than 200,000 in Belarus and eastern Poland.

Bach-Zelewski's methods produced a high civilian death toll and relatively minor military gains. In fighting irregular battles with the partisans, his units slaughtered civilians in order to inflate the figures of "enemy losses"; indeed, far more fatalities were usually reported than weapons captured. The German troops would encircle areas controlled by the partisans in a time-consuming manner, allowing real partisans to slip away. After an operation was completed, no permanent military presence was maintained, which gave the partisans a chance to resume where they had left off. Even when successful in pacification actions, Bach-Zelewski usually accomplished little more than to force the real enemy to relocate and multiply their numbers with civilians enraged by the massacres.

Bach-Zelewski told Leo Alexander:

I am the only living witness but I must say the truth. Contrary to the opinion of the National Socialists, that the Jews were a highly organized group, the appalling fact was that they had no organization whatsoever. The mass of the Jewish people were taken complete by surprise. They did not know at all what to do; they had no directives or slogans as to how they should act. This is the greatest lie of anti-Semitism because it gives the lie to that old slogan that the Jews are conspiring to dominate the world and that they are so highly organized. In reality, they had no organization of their own at all, not even an information service. If they had had some sort of organization, these people could have been saved by the millions, but instead, they were taken completely by surprise. Never before has a people gone as unsuspectingly to its disaster. Nothing was prepared. Absolutely nothing. It was not so, as the anti-Semites say, that they were friendly to the Soviets. That is the most appalling misconception of all. The Jews in the old Poland, who were never communistic in their sympathies, were, throughout the area of the Bug eastward, more afraid of Bolshevism than of the Nazis. This was insanity. They could have been saved. There were people among them who had much to lose, business people; they didn't want to leave. In addition there was love of home and their experience with pogroms in Russia. After the first anti-Jewish actions of the Germans, they thought now the wave was over and so they walked back to their undoing.

In July 1943, Bach-Zelewski received command of all anti-partisan actions in Belgium, Belarus, France, the General Government, the Netherlands, Norway, Ukraine, Yugoslavia, and parts of the Bialystok District. In practice, his activities remained confined to Belarus and contiguous parts of Russia.

In early 1944, he took part in front-line fighting in the Kovel area, but in March he had to return to Germany for medical treatment. Himmler assumed all his posts.

==== Warsaw Uprising ====
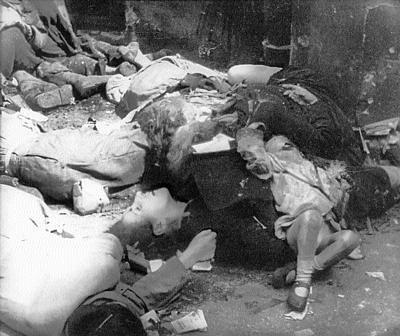
Photos taken by the Polish Underground showing the bodies of women and children killed during the Warsaw Uprising, August 1944.

Bach-Zelewski was designated a General of the Waffen-SS on 1 July 1944. On 2 August 1944, he took command of all German troops fighting Bor-Komorowski's Home Army that had staged the Warsaw Uprising. The German forces were made up of 17,000 men arranged in two battle groups: under Hanns von Rohr, and under Heinz Reinefarth – the latter included the SS-Sonderregiment Dirlewanger, consisted of probationary troops, and convicted criminals. This command group was named after Bach-Zelewski, as Korpsgruppe Bach. Units under his command murdered approximately 200,000 civilians (more than 65,000 in mass executions) and an unknown number of prisoners of war, in numerous atrocities throughout the city.

After more than two months of heavy fighting and the almost total destruction of Warsaw, Bach-Zelewski managed to take control of the city, committing atrocities in the process, notably the Wola massacre. Bach-Zelewski was awarded the Knight's Cross of the Iron Cross on 30 September 1944. On 4 October 1944, he accepted the surrender of General Tadeusz Bór-Komorowski. Incidentally, during the slaughter and razing of Warsaw, he is alleged to have personally saved Fryderyk Chopin's heart, by taking it for his own collection of curiosities. The recovered heart is held at Warsaw's Holy Cross Church.

=== Last months of the war ===
In October 1944, he was sent by Hitler to the Hungarian capital Budapest, where he participated in the fall of Regent Miklós Horthy and his government, and its replacement by the fascist and highly antisemitic Arrow Cross Party with their leader Ferenc Szálasi. In particular, he was involved in the persecution of the Hungarian Jews.

In December 1944, he became commander of the XIV SS Corps in the Baden-Baden region and between 26 January and 10 February 1945 of the X SS Corps in Pomerania, where his unit was annihilated after less than two weeks. He then commanded from 17 February 1945, the Oder Corps under Army Group Vistula.

=== Postwar ===
After the war in Europe ended, Bach-Zelewski went into hiding and tried to leave the country. US military police arrested him on 1 August 1945. In exchange for his testimony against his former superiors at the Nuremberg trials, Bach-Zelewski was not extradited to Poland or to the USSR and never faced trial for any war crimes. During his testimony at the Nuremberg trials, Bach-Zelewski stated that he disapproved of Himmler's aim to exterminate 30 million Slavs, but explained it thus: "when, for years, for decades, the doctrine is preached that the Slav is a member of an inferior race and that the Jew is not even human, then such an explosion is inevitable." In saying so, Bach-Zelewski effectively linked the facts of mass murder on the ground to Nazi ideology, and established the connection between the Wehrmacht and the actions of the Einsatzgruppen in the Soviet Union, which turned out to be of great value to interrogators and prosecutors at the Nuremberg Trials.

Bach-Zelewski left prison in 1949. In 1951, Bach-Zelewski claimed that he helped Hermann Göring commit suicide in 1946. As evidence, he produced cyanide capsules to the authorities with serial numbers not far removed from the one used by Göring. The authorities never verified Bach-Zelewski's claim, and did not charge him with aiding Göring's death. Most modern historians dismiss Bach-Zelewski's claim and agree that a U.S. Army contact within the Palace of Justice's prison at Nuremberg most likely aided Göring in his suicide.

=== Trials and convictions ===
In 1951, Bach-Zelewski was sentenced to 10 years in a labor camp for the murder of political opponents in the early 1930s; however, he was not imprisoned until February 1961, when he was convicted of the manslaughter of Anton von Hohberg und Buchwald, an SS officer, during the Night of the Long Knives. He was sentenced to 4 years and 6 months imprisonment.

In 1962, Bach-Zelewski was sentenced to life in prison for the murder of seven German Communists in the early 1930s. None of the sentences referred to his role in Poland, in the Soviet Union or his participation in the Holocaust, although he openly denounced himself as a mass murderer. He had at the same time "denounced Himmler's racism in strong terms, as well as incitement to ‘exterminate "inferior races", possibly to curry favor with prosecutors. Bach-Zelewski died in Harlaching Hospital after transfer from Stadelheim Prison due to illness in Munich on 8 March 1972, a week after his 73rd birthday.

Bach-Zelewski gave evidence for the defence at the trial of Adolf Eichmann in Israel in May 1961. His evidence was to the effect that operations in Russia and parts of Poland were conducted by Operations Units of the Security Police and were not subject to the orders of Eichmann's office, nor was Eichmann able to give orders to the officers in charge of these units, who were responsible for the murder of Jews and Gypsies. The evidence was provided at a hearing in Nuremberg in May 1961.

== Personal life ==
Bach-Zelewski was raised Catholic, changing to Protestant in 1933, and finally to Gottgläubig in 1938.

He married Ruth Apfeld in 1922, had three daughters and three sons. In 1947, while a prisoner in Nuremberg, he wed his wife in a Catholic ceremony. In 1957, his two sons emigrated to the United States. One joined the U.S. Army.

== See also ==
- Glossary of Nazi Germany
- List of Nazi Party leaders and officials
