= Israfil Israfilov =

Russian-Azerbaijani-Polish military officer

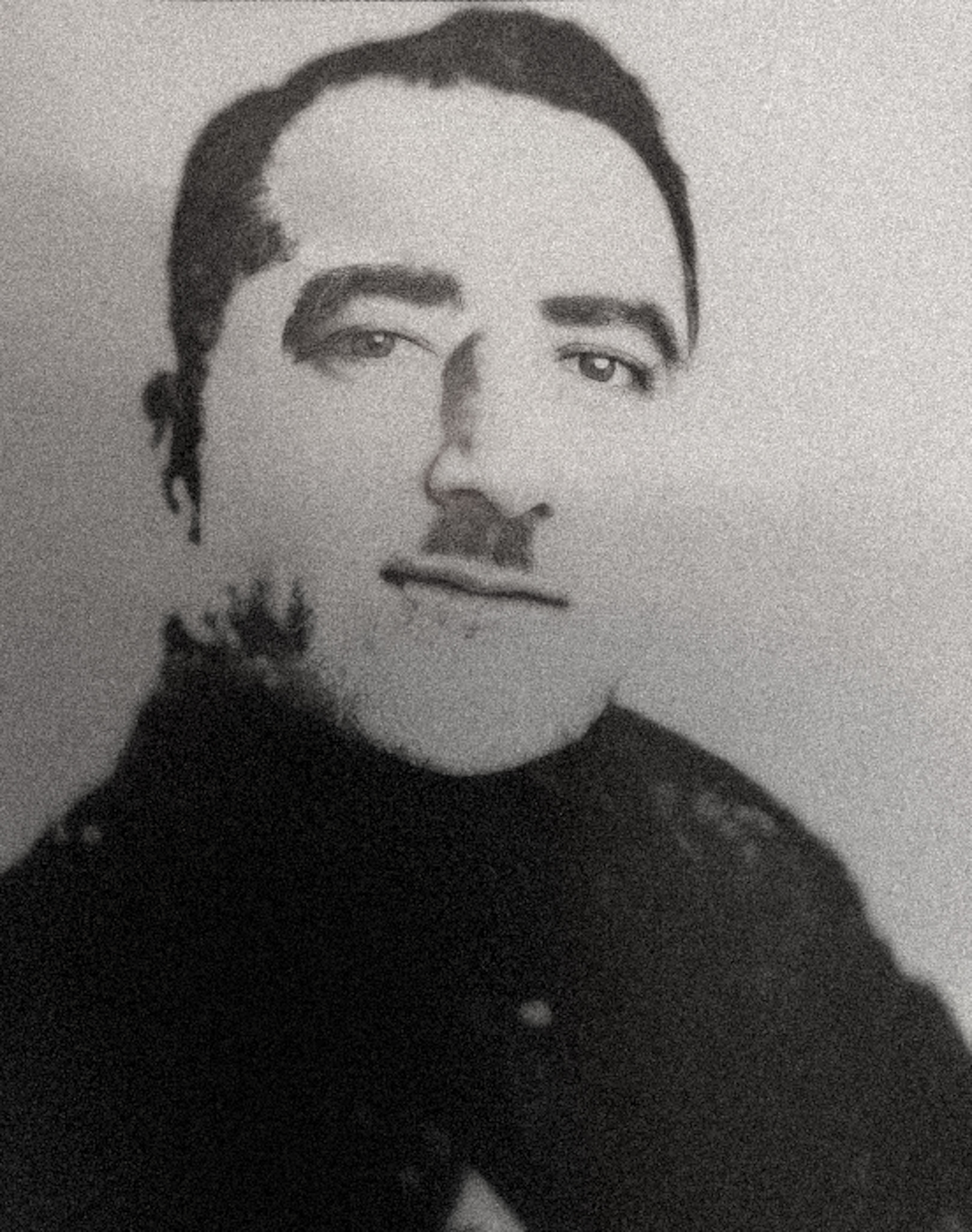
- Born: July 5, 1892, or January 25, 1893; Seyfəli, Elizavetpol uezd, Elizavetpol Governorate, Russian Empire
- Died: 1946 (aged 52–53); Baku, Azerbaijan SSR, USSR
- Cause of death: Execution by shooting
- Other names: Israfil bey Muhammed; Israfil bey Israfilbeyli
- Education: Higher War School
- Military career
- Allegiance: Russian Empire; ADR; Republic of Poland; Nazi Germany
- Branch: Wehrmacht; Schutzstaffel
- Service years: 1913–1945
- Rank: Captain; Polkovnik; SS-Standartenführer
- Conflicts: World War I; Caucasus campaign; Battle of Baku; Russian Civil War; Mughan clashes; Karabakh clashes; Soviet invasion of Azerbaijan; World War II

Israfil Israfilov (Azerbaijani: İsrafil İsrafilov; Russian: Исрафил Исрафилов), Israfil Muhammed bey (Polish: Israfił Muhamed bey, Muchamed Israfił-Bey), or in short Israfil-Bey (1892, or 1893 — 1946) was Russian, Azerbaijani and Polish military officer, Standartenführer of the Waffen-SS.

== Early life ==
Israfil Israfilov was born on 5 July 1892, or 25 January 1893 in a village of Seyfəli in Elitsabethpol Uyezd. Graduated from Elisabethpol (Ganja) Men's Gymnasium (1912) and the Tiflis Military School (1914).

== Imperial Russian Army ==
Israfil Israfilov entered military service with the rank of Junker on 13 September 1913. In 1914, he was promoted from Junker to Podporuchik on the exam, with enrollment in the infantry (1914).

After graduating from a military school, he was placed at the disposal of the chief of staff of the Kazan Military District, where he was assigned to serve in the 96th infantry reserve battalion stationed in Simbirsk (now Ulyanovsk). In 1915, he was sent from this battalion to the active army on the Southwestern Front, where he served in the Minsk 54th Infantry Regiment of the 14th Infantry Division. Participated in the battles of 1915–1916 on the Southwestern front, from December 1916 on the Romanian front. On 21 April 1915, he was wounded in a battle in Volyn near the village of Bokiyma. On 3 May 1915 he was wounded again in a battle near the village of Tamanovichi and evacuated for treatment. Later he became Poruchik (1915), Stabs-kapitan (1916) and Captain (1917). In the autumn of 1917 he commanded a battalion in the Minsk 54th Infantry Regiment on the Romanian front.

== In Azerbaijan ==
After the revolution, he returned to the Caucasus, and served as a captain in the 2nd Infantry Division of the newly created Muslim (Azerbaijani) Corps. From July 1918 he served in the Islamic Army of the Caucasus as an armored train commander. Participated in August–September 1918 in the battle of Baku.

He began to serve in the newly formed Azerbaijani army. By order of January 11, 1919, he became a Podpolkovnik. By order of January 14, 1919, he was appointed commander of the 1st Javanshir Infantry Regiment, and by order of February 19, 1919, he was appointed staff officer under the Ministry of War. By order of June 25, 1919, Israfil Israfilov was appointed commander of the 5th Baku Infantry Regiment, which had just begun to form. On March 21, 1920, he became a Polkovnik, with approval as commander of the 5th Baku Infantry Regiment.

Participated in the suppression of the Mughan clashes of 1918-1919 and the Armenian–Azerbaijani war of 1918-1920 (battles against Armenians in Zangezur and Nagorno-Karabakh).

== Interwar Poland ==
In 1920, Israfil Israfilov fled his homeland after the Red Army invasion of Azerbaijan. In 1924, he relocated from Turkey to Poland and entered the service in the Polish Army (Wojsko Polskie in Polish). From 1926 to 1928 he studied at the Higher War School in Warsaw. He first served in the 36th Infantry Regiment in Warsaw, and in the spring of 1939 became a staff officer in the 29th Infantry Division in Grodno.

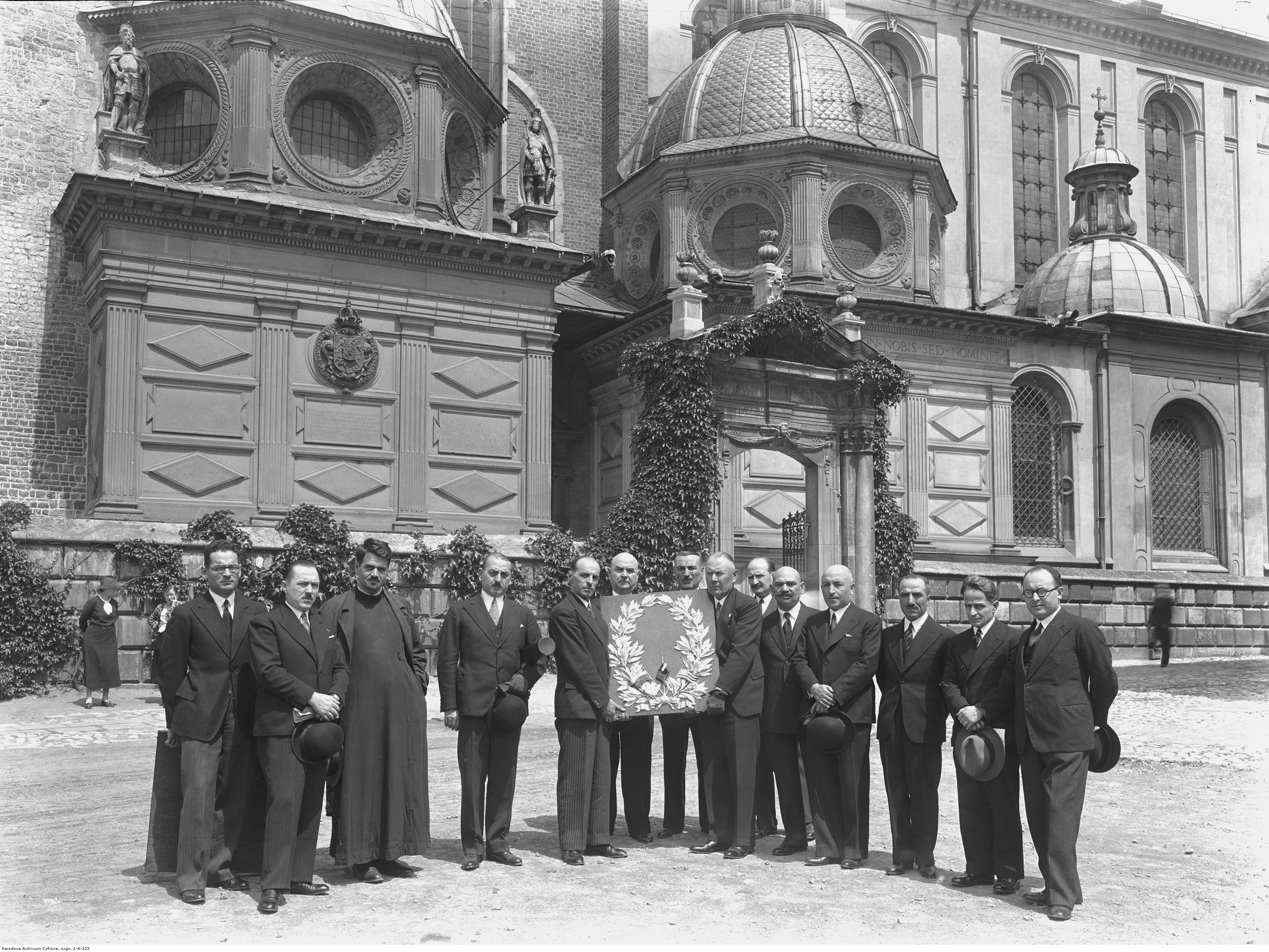
Israfil Israfilov (3rd from right) among Caucasian delegates before laying a wreath at the tomb of Marshal Jozef Pilsudski in Krakow, 1936

His military colleagues were Arczil Bek Jedygarov, Israfil Bek Jedigar, Veli Bek Jedigar, Dzangir Kazim-bek, Mehmed Zade Hamid bek, Safar Ogly Kazim bek and others. He was one of the active figures of the Azerbaijani emigration in Poland. Along with such political emigrants as Mahammad Amin Rasulzade, Mir Yagub Mehdiyev, Mirza Bala Mammadzade, Ali Azertekin, Dzangir Kazim-bek (Jahangir bey Kazimbeyli), Naghi Bayramli, he was published in the North Caucasian émigré periodicals Severnyj Kavkaz and Gortsy Kavkaza, which were published in Warsaw in 1930s.

== World War II ==
During the German invasion of Poland in 1939, Israfil Israfilov was captured by the Germans, from which he was released. In the subsequent years of World War II, he actively cooperated with the pro-German part of the Azerbaijani emigration, the authorities of Nazi Germany, and the command of the Wehrmacht. Hatred of the Bolshevik regime led a number of the former Russian army and national army officers to cooperate with Hitler's Germany. During the war, German military-intelligence service established the Special Group Bergmann in Mittenwald under the command of Theodor Oberländer. This unit consisted of three battalions: 1st (Georgian), 2nd (Azerbaijani) and 3rd (North Caucasian). The Azerbaijani combat group under the command of Israfil Bey was part of the Kaukasischer Waffen-Verband der SS.

From the summer of 1943 to 1944 Isarafil Bey worked as the head of the Azerbaijani committee in Berlin. The Committee operated under the Reich Ministry for the Occupied Eastern Territories. From September 1943, he commanded the 314th Regiment of the Wehrmacht's 162nd Turkestan Division, consisting of prisoners of war of Turkic origin. From 12 December 1944, he headed the "Azerbaijan" Waffen-Gruppe in the Kaukasischer Waffen-Verband der SS in the rank of Standartenführer. On 17 March 1945, he was appointed military adviser to the National Committee of Azerbaijan in Berlin.

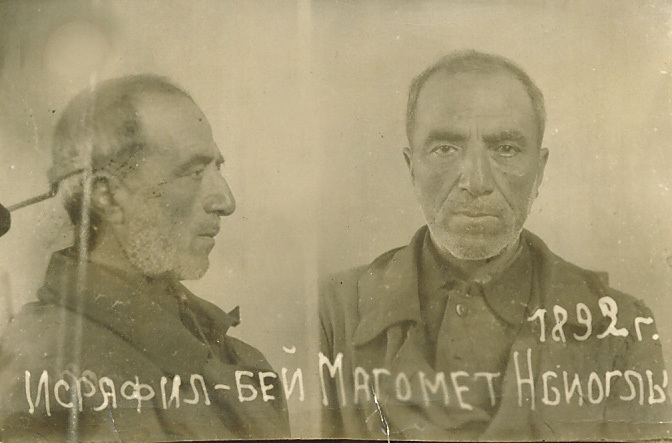
Mugshot of Israfil Israfilov

After World War II, he was captured and handed over to the USSR by the United States Armed Forces, and on 11 July 1945, he was sentenced to death by the Baku Military District Tribunal. Israfilov was shot in 1946.

== Sources ==
- Neulen, Hans Werner (1985). An deutscher Seite : Internationale Freiwillige von Wehrmacht und Waffen-SS (in German). München: Universitas Verlag München. ISBN 9783800410699.
- Hoffmann, Joachim (1991). Kaukasien 1942/43. Das deutsche Heer und die Orientvölker der Sowjetunion (in German). Freiburg: Rombach Druck- und Verlagshaus. ISBN 3793001946.
- Munoz, Antonio J. (2001). The East came West: Muslim, Hindu and Buddhist Volunteers in the German Armed Forces, 1941-1945. Bayside, NY: Axis Europa Books. ISBN 9781891227394.
- Romanko, Oleg (2004). Мусульманские легионы Второй мировой войны (in Russian). Москва: «Издательство АСТ». ISBN 9-785170-198160.
- Yaqublu, Nasiman (2005). Azərbaycan legionerləri (in Azerbaijani). Baku: Çıraq.
- Yaqublu, Nasiman (2007). Azərbaycan-Polşa əlaqələrində M. Ə. Rəsulzadənin rolu (in Azerbaijani). Bakı: «Adiloğlu» nəşriyyatı. ISBN 978-9952-25-052-7.
- Abutalibov, Ramiz (2007). Свои среди чужих, чужой среди своих (in Russian). Москва: Гриф и К. ISBN 978-5-8125-0901-9.
- Nazirli, Shamistan (2009). 1920-ci ildə Qarabağ döyüşləri (in Azerbaijani). Bakı: "Təfəkkür" Universitetinin metbəəsi.

== See also ==
- Azerbaijani Legion
- Abdurrahman Fatalibeyli
