= Wehrmacht foreign volunteers and conscripts =

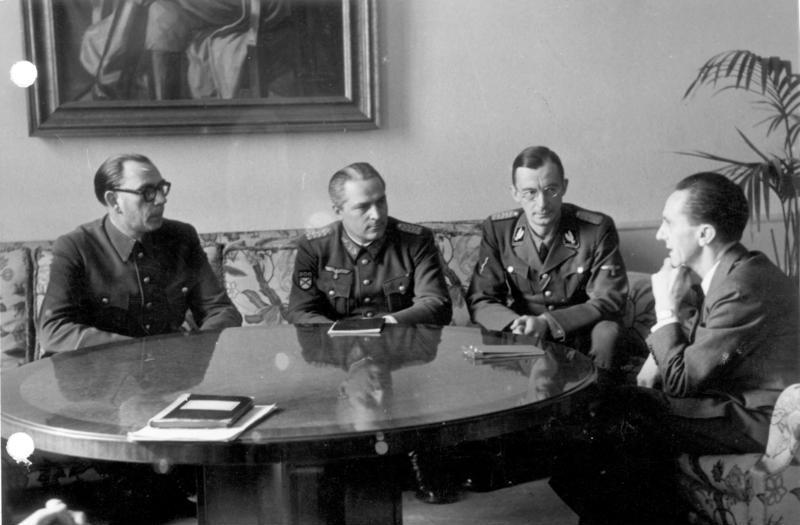
Andrey Vlasov and General Zhilenkov (center) of the Russian Liberation Army meeting with Joseph Goebbels (February 1945)

Among the approximately one million foreign volunteers and conscripts who served in the Wehrmacht during World War II were ethnic Belgians, Czechs, Dutch, Finns, Danes, French, Hungarians, Norwegians, Poles, Portuguese, Swedes, Swiss along with people from Great Britain, Ireland, Estonia, Latvia, Lithuania, and the Balkans. At least 47,000 Spaniards served in the Blue Division.

Many Soviet citizens (Russians and other non-Russian ethnic minorities) joined the Wehrmacht forces as Hiwis (or Hilfswillige). The Ukrainian collaborationist forces were composed of an estimated number of 180,000 volunteers serving with units scattered all over Europe. Russian émigrés and defectors from the Soviet Union participated in the formation of the Russian Liberation Army. Thousands of White exiles also fought and served within German units of the Wehrmacht both on the Eastern Front and in Europe. Non-Russians from the Soviet Union formed the Ostlegionen (literally "Eastern Legions"). The East Legions comprized a total of 175,000 personnel. These units were all commanded by General Ernst August Köstring (1876−1953). A lower estimate for the total number of foreign volunteers that served in the entire German armed forces (including the Waffen SS) is 350,000.

These units were often under the command of German officers and some published their own propaganda newssheets.

== Soviet Union ==
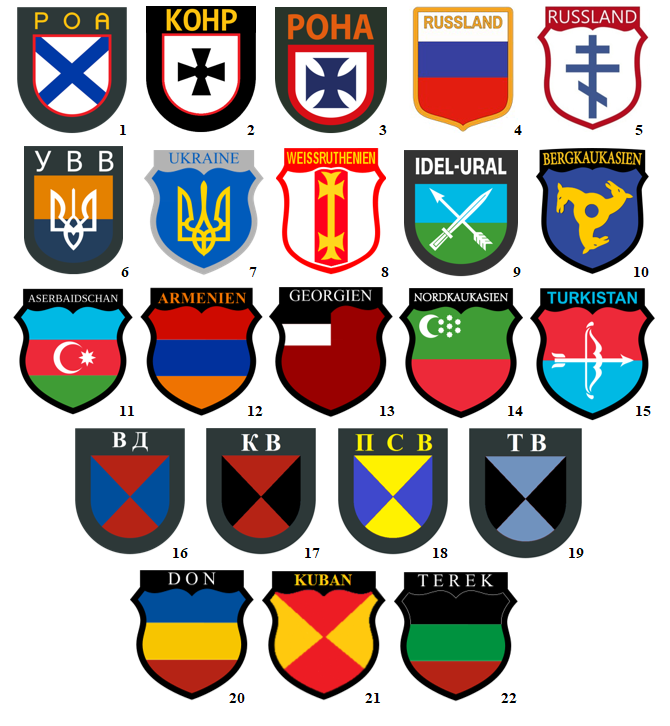
Patches of Soviet volunteers in the Wehrmacht.

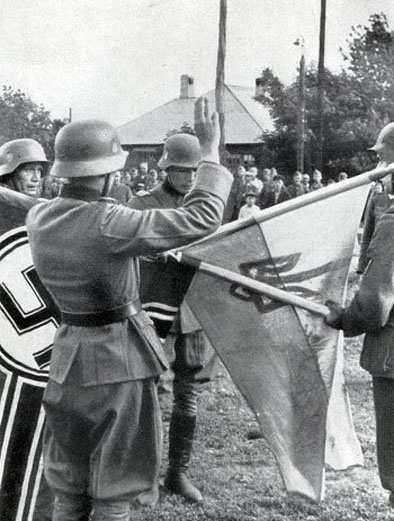
The Ukrainian Liberation Army's oath to Adolf Hitler

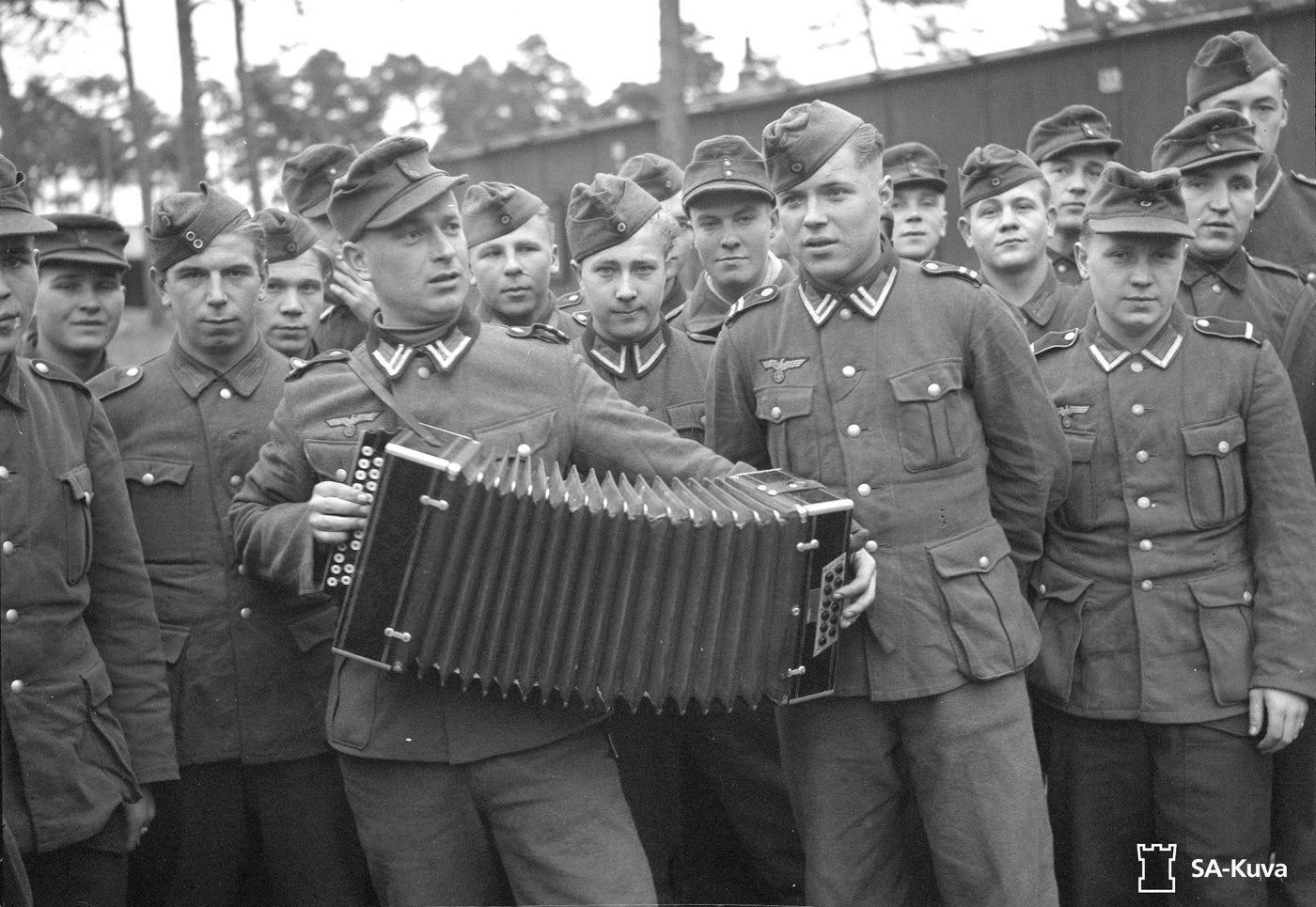
Ingrian Wehrmacht volunteers of the 664th Eastern Battalion, 1943

Unit name	Description
Armenian Legion	Mostly Soviet Armenians
Azerbaijani Legion	Mostly Soviet Azeris
Georgian Legion	Mostly Soviet Georgians
Hiwi	Soviet civilians and prisoners of war
XV SS Cossack Cavalry Corps	Until 1 February 1945 under command of the Wehrmacht, then the Corps was transferred to the Waffen-SS
Kalmykian Voluntary Cavalry Corps	Mostly Kalmyks
Litauische Bau-Bataillonen	Mostly conscripted Lithuanians
Fatherland Defense Force	Land unit composed of Lithuanians
Luftwaffen-Legion Lettland	Air unit composed of Latvians.
Nachtigall Battalion	Ukrainians of the Organization of Ukrainian Nationalists
Ostlegionen	Consisting mostly of Caucasians
Roland Battalion	A.k.a. Special Group Roland. Second Polish Republic citizens of Ukrainian ethnicity
Russian Liberation Army	Mostly ethnic Russians
Russian People's Liberation Army	Mostly ethnic Russians (1944 transferred to Waffen-SS)
162nd Turkoman Division	Formed in May 1943 and comprised 5 Azeri and 6 Turkestani artillery/infantry units.
Ukrainian Liberation Army	Ukrainians
Ukrainian National Army	Ukrainians

=== Azerbaijani, Georgian and Armenian volunteers ===
- Armenische Legion (Armenian volunteers)
- Aserbaidschanische Legion (Azerbaijani volunteers)
- 30. Waffen-Grenadier-Division der SS (Russische Nr. 2)
- Georgische Legion (Georgian volunteers)
- Freiwilligen-Stamm-Regiment 1 (Georgian volunteers)
- Freiwilligen-Stamm-Regiment 2 (Armenians & Azerbaijanis)
- Sonderverband Bergmann (Georgian and Azerbaijani volunteers)
  - I. Sonderverband Bergmann Battalion (Georgian volunteers)
  - III. Sonderverband Bergmann Battalion (Azerbaijani volunteers)
- SS-Waffengruppe Georgien (Georgian volunteers)
- SS-Waffengruppe Armenien (Armenian volunteers)
- SS-Waffengruppe Aserbaidschan (Azeri volunteers)

=== North Caucasian volunteers ===
- Kaukasisch-Mohammedanische Legion (Azerbaijani, Circassian, Daghestani, Chechen, Ingush, and Lezghin volunteer units)
- Kaukasischer-Waffen-Verband der SS or Freiwilligen Brigade Nordkaukasien (volunteers from the North Caucasus region)
- Nordkaukasische Legion ("North Caucasian Legion" volunteers from the North Caucasus region)
- Freiwilligen-Stamm-Regiment 1 (North Caucasian volunteers)
- Sonderverband Bergmann (North Caucasian volunteers)
  - II. Sonderverband Bergmann Battalion (North Caucasian volunteers)
- SS-Waffengruppe Nordkaukasus (North Caucasian volunteers; Chechens, Ingush & Dagestani)

=== Central Asian volunteers ===
- 162. (Turkistan) Infanterie-Division (Turkestani volunteers)
- Muselmanischen SS-Division Neu-Turkistan (Turkestani volunteers)
- Turkistanische Legion (volunteers from Central Asia; Uzbeks, Kazakhs, Kyrgyzs & Turkmen)
- Böhler-Brigade (Turkestani volunteers)
- 1. Turkestanisches-Arbeits-Battalion (Turkestani volunteers)
- 2. Turkestanisches-Arbeits-Battalion (Turkestani volunteers)
- 3. Turkestanisches-Arbeits-Battalion (Turkestani volunteers)
- Osttürkischer Waffen-Verband der SS or 1. Ostmuselmanisches SS-Regiment (Central Asia volunteers)
- Turkestanisches-Arbeits-Ersatz-Battalion (Turkestani volunteers)
- Waffen-Gruppe Turkistan (Central Asian volunteers)

=== Kalmykian volunteers ===
- Kalmüken Verband Dr. Doll (Kalmykian volunteers)
- Abwehrtrupp 103 (Kalmykian volunteers)
- Kalmücken Legion or Kalmücken-Kavallerie-Korps (Kalmykian volunteers)

=== Tatar volunteers ===
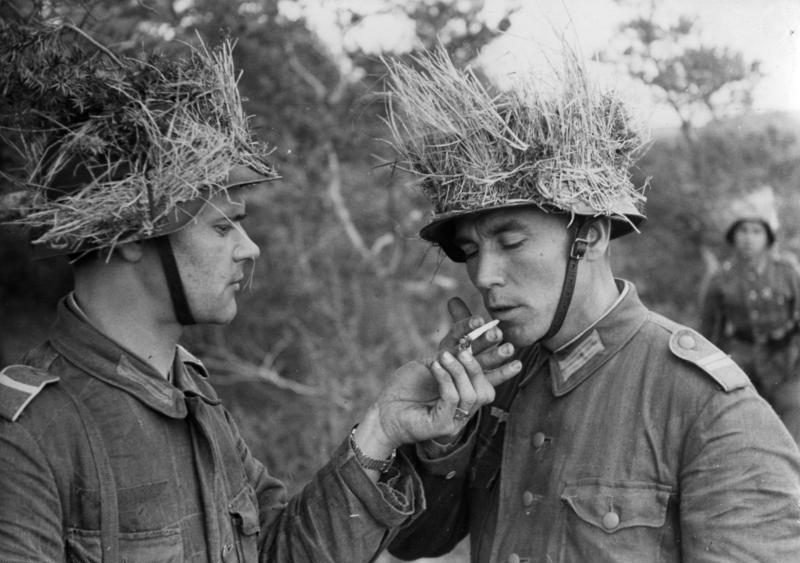
Volga Tatars during a lull in the fighting

- Tatar Legion
- SS-Waffengruppe Idel-Ural (Turkic volunteers from Volga/Ural area)
- Waffen-Gebirgs-Brigade der SS (Tatar Nr. 1) (Tatar volunteers)
- 30. Waffen-Grenadier-Division der SS (Russische Nr. 2) (Armenian & Tatar volunteer units)
- Wolgatatarische Legion (Volga Tatars and Volga-Finns)
- Tataren-Gebirgsjäger-Regiment der SS (Crimean Tatar volunteers)
- Waffen-Gruppe Krim (Crimean Tatar volunteers)
- Schutzmannschaft Battalion (Crimean Tatar volunteers)

=== Cossack volunteers ===
- 1st Cossack Division (volunteers from Cossacks in the Soviet Union, from February 1945 XV SS Cossack Cavalry Corps)
- Kazachi Stan, a mobile encampment and a combat formation composed of Cossack collaborators and their dependents
- Kosaken-Reiter-Brigade Kaukasus II (Caucasus Cossack volunteers)
- Kuban-Kosaken-Reiter-Regiment 3 (Kuban Cossack volunteers)
- Don-Kosaken-Reiter-Regiment 5 (Don Cossack volunteers)
- Terek-Kosaken-Reiter-Regiment 6 (Terek Cossack volunteers)
- Kosaken-Artillerie-Regiment 2 (Caucasian Cossack volunteers)
- Sibirisches Kosaken-Reiter-Regiment 2 (Siberian Cossack volunteers)
- Freiwilligen-Stamm-Regiment 5 (Cossack volunteers)

=== Caucasian mixed volunteer units ===
- Freiwilligen-Stamm-Division (Georgian, Turkish, North Caucasian, Armenian, Azerbaijani, Iranian volunteers)

=== Caucasian, Central Asian, Crimean and Ural mixed volunteer units ===
- Waffen-Gruppe Turkistan
- Waffen-Gruppe Idel-Ural
- Waffen-Gruppe Azerbaijan
- Waffen-Gruppe Krim

== Europe ==
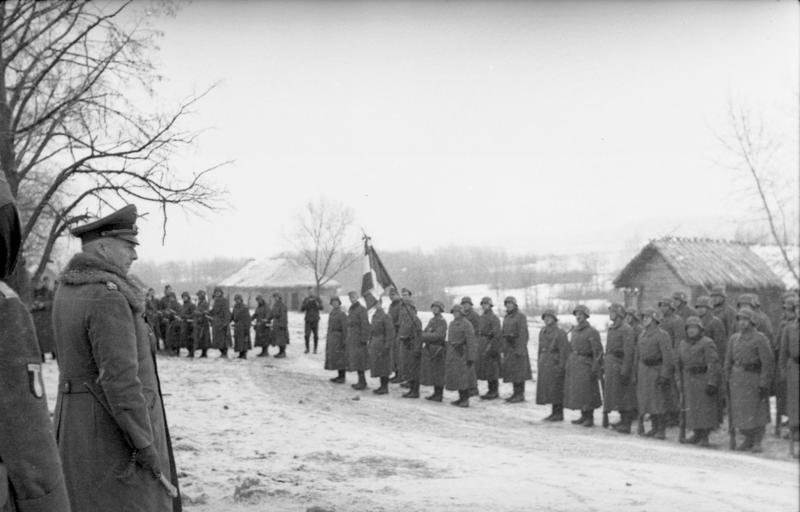
German Field Marshal Hans von Kluge visits French Legion in November 1941 upon its arrival on the Eastern Front

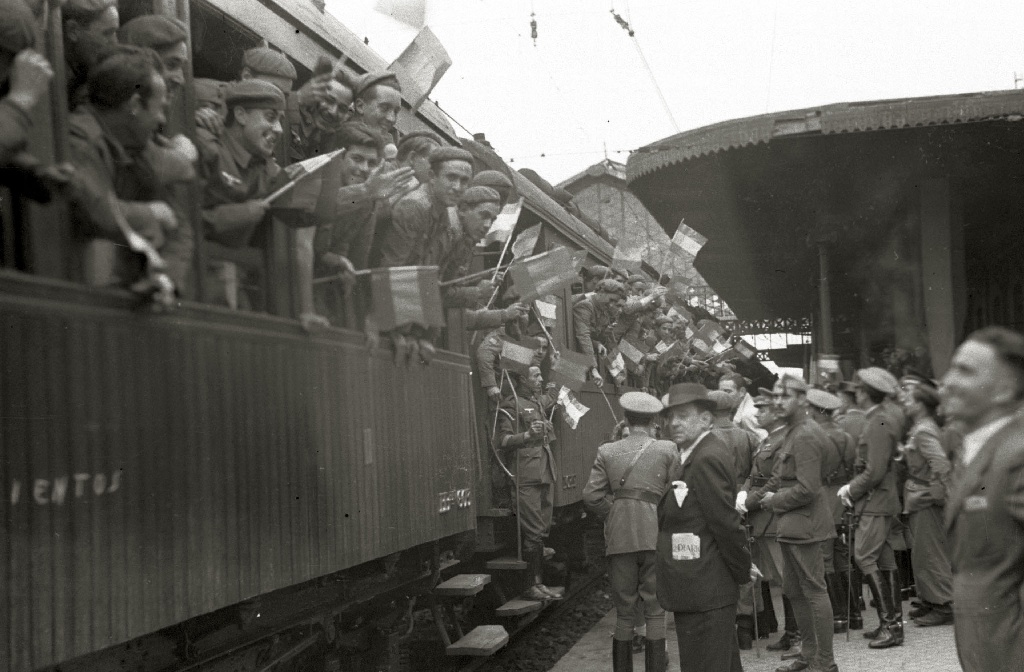
Spanish volunteer forces of the Blue Division entrain at San Sebastián, 1942

=== Balkan volunteers ===
- 369th (Croatian) Infantry Division
- 373rd (Croatian) Infantry Division
- 392nd (Croatian) Infantry Division
- 369th Croatian Reinforced Infantry Regiment
- Croatian Naval Legion
- Croatian Air Force Legion
- Croatian Anti-Aircraft Legion
- Russian Protective Corps Serbia
- Montenegrin Volunteer Corps

=== Belgian volunteers ===
- Walloon Legion, 1941–1943 (subsequently transferred to the Waffen-SS)
- Walloon Guard

=== Estonian volunteers ===
- Starting in August 1941, the Wehrmacht recruited six Security Groups (battalions No. 181-186, about 4,000 men), subordinate to the 18th Army on one-year contracts.
- After the above contract expired, some volunteers transferred to the Waffen-SS or returned to civilian life, and three Eastern Battalions (No. 658-660) were formed from those who remained. They served in the rear of the 18th Army until early 1944, after which their members transferred to the 20th Waffen-SS Division.

=== French volunteers ===
- Legion of French Volunteers Against Bolshevism
- Légion impériale

=== Lithuanian volunteers ===
- Fatherland Defense Force

=== Spanish volunteers ===
- Blue Division
- Blue Legion

== Middle East ==
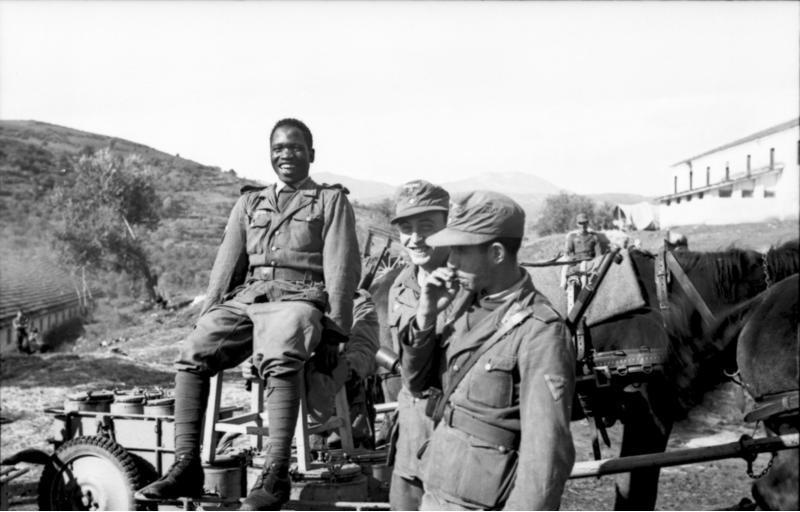
Soldiers of the Free Arabian Legion in Greece, September 1943.

- Free Arabian Legion
- Freiwilligen-Stamm-Regiment 1 (Turkish volunteers)

== Other ==
- Indian Legion
- Malgré-nous
- Military enrolment in German-occupied Poland

== See also ==
- Collaboration with the Axis Powers during World War II
- Waffen-SS foreign volunteers and conscripts
- Selbstschutz - ethnic-German self-protection units formed in the lead-up to World War II
