= Harun el-Raschid Bey =

German military officer (1886–1963)

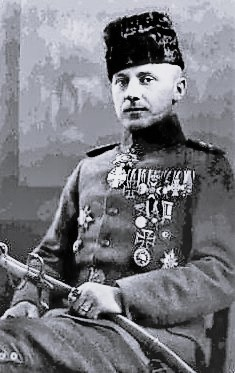
- Born: Wilhelm Hintersatz; May 26, 1886; Senftenberg, Brandenburg, German Empire
- Died: March 29, 1963 (aged 76); Lübeck, Schleswig-Holstein, West Germany
- Occupation: SS-Standartenführer

Harun el-Raschid Bey (born Wilhelm Hintersatz; May 26, 1886 – March 29, 1963) was a German officer and SS Standartenführer, born in the city of Arwi near to Senftenberg, Brandenburg (some sources claim that he was Austrian). During World War II, he commanded the Osttürkischer Waffenverband division of the SS.

== World War I and Interwar ==
El-Raschid was born Wilhelm Hintersatz in Brandenburg in 1886. During the First World War, he converted to Islam while serving with the general staff of the Ottoman Empire with Enver Pasha. During his time there, he developed an admiration for Otto Liman von Sanders, whom he had met. El-Raschid later wrote a sentimental biography of Sanders, published in Berlin in 1932. He was a military officer serving both the Germans and the Ottomans. In 1919, he took the name of Harun el-Raschid Bey, the name he was listed by in the Dienstalterslisten der SS. According to one source, el-Raschid became a Turk when he was adopted by a Turkish family and was a heavy bomber pilot during the war.

Islamic mobilization during the war influenced el-Raschid. He became involved with former Muslim POWs at Wünsdorf Camp after the war ended, and had served the Italian intelligence in the 1930s in Abyssinia. He believed that he had the "trust of the native Mohammedans", who saw in him "a fellow believer, who prayed without timidity in their mosque". He wanted to cut the "Achilles' heel" of Germany's enemy, England, with what he saw as its most dangerous threat, which was, to him, Islam. During his activities in the Islamic world, el-Raschid believed that his belief in Islam and his connection to Muslims was his key "instrument" in gaining their trust.

== World War II ==
After the beginning of the German invasion of Russia, el-Raschid served as a liaison officer and the main line of contact between the Reich Security Main Office and the Grand Mufti of Jerusalem, Haj Amin al-Husseini, who was seen as the spiritual leader of the SS Neu-Turkestan Division. Previously prevented from forming in Slovakia, the Germans did not give up on their goal to create a Muslim division. Due to his closeness to the Grand Mufti, el-Raschid was seen as the perfect choice to lead such a division. El-Raschid and the Grand Mufti began drawing up a plan. They believed that Bosnia was the ideal place to deploy this division, as they believed that cooperation with the 13th Waffen Mountain Division of the SS Handschar (1st Croatian) would be beneficial to the training of the division. Additionally, Bosnia was a Muslim territory, and religious buildings and leaders could bolster their faith. El-Raschid was supported in his endeavor to create a division by Prince Mansour Daoud, a relative of King Farouk of Egypt, who joined its forces and bolstered their character. El-Raschid was impressed with Daoud's "effective propaganda".

El-Raschid tried to enlist German or Germanic officers for his division. Among his choices were SS-Hauptsturmführer Quintus de Veer, SS-Untersturmführer Körber of the 5th SS Mountain Corps, Gerd Schulte, and SS-Sturmbannführer Franz Liebermann. This division was finally deployed by order of Heinrich Himmler on October 20, 1944, and it was supposed to be dubbed the Osttürkischer Waffenverband. Most of the division was made up of members of the Ostmuselmanisches SS-Regiment, who had been transferred to Slovakia. Three Waffengruppen, created and divided upon ethnic lines (Volga-Tatar (Idel-Ural), Crimea (Krim), and Turkestan) were supposed to train many battalions, but there were problems with supplies - vehicles were not working and the only weapons that could be used were malfunctioning weapons from the Ostmuselmanische SS-Regiment Nr. 1, which was the largest group (while still small). The regiment was incorporated into Waffengruppe Turkestan. There was an additional Waffengruppe, named Azerbaijan (Aserbaidschan), created later, with 2851 soldiers. The division was composed mostly of soldiers from Muslim communities of the southern Soviet Union, especially the Turkmens as well as Caspian and Black Sea Tatars that felt no loyalty to the USSR. It suffered from bad discipline and morale, and were only used to their full potential once the Germans started running into manpower problems. In 1944, the unit assisted in suppressing the Warsaw Uprising. However, on Christmas Eve 1944, the Turkmen of the Ostmuselmanische SS-Regiment Nr. 1 mutinied - partially due to them being mooted for transfer to Andrei Vlasov's Russian Liberation Army, which was seen as a betrayal of their anti-Russian ideals, and el-Raschid's general incompetence and inability to interact well with his men. This caused Himmler to immediately dismiss el-Raschid, disbanding and reorganizing the regiment under a different name.

During the War, el-Raschid wrote the novel Schwartz oder Weiss: Ad Imperium Romanum versus (Black or White: Towards the Roman Empire), published in Berlin in 1940. This work of fiction claimed to be based on his experiences in the "African war" in Ethiopia.

In March 1945, the previously sacked el-Raschid, now leader of Waffengruppe Idel-Ural, met with the local partisans and surrendered in Merate in Northern Italy, surrendering his Tatar men under the condition that they would be treated humanely. He decided to surrender to partisans due to the fear that surrendering to Americans would lead them to see his men as Japanese soldiers, who would be run over with tanks. On April 26, el-Raschid's men laid down their arms, with 150 of them being shot immediately by the partisans at Col Di Nesse. El-Raschid and his men were later handed to the 1st Armored Division, and the Tatars were sent back to the Soviet Union, where they were either promptly shot or sent to gulags.

== Post-war ==
El-Raschid was taken prisoner by the United States after the war, and was released. In 1954, his book From the Orient to the Occident: A Mosaic of Various Colored Experiences, a detailed work on his experiences and travels, was published in Bielefeld.

In late March 1956, former Imam of the Osttürkischer Waffenverband Nurredin Namangani returned to Germany, landing in Munich. His early activities included talking about a Muslim prayer room in Munich. However, by late 1958, he was talking about building an entire mosque in the city. El-Raschid was one of his key supporters – the two were close, and had known each other during the war. Both had been imprisoned by the United States. El-Raschid wrote to the federal president, Theodor Heuss, stressing Namangani's "love for Germany" and that he was a "true loyal friend of Germany". He argued that Muslims in Germany lacked a politically free mosque and a "dignified central religious and cultural center", as they did in other Western countries.

== See also ==
- Waffen-SS foreign volunteers and conscripts
- Turkic, Caucasian, Cossack, and Crimean collaborationism with the Axis powers
- Azeri SS Volunteer Formations
