= Baymirza Hayit =

Uzbek 20th century historian of Turkestan and Central Asia (1917–2006)

- Born: December 17, 1917; Namangan, Russian Turkestan
- Died: October 31, 2006 (aged 88); Cologne, Germany
- Occupations: Historian, Orientalist, Soldier during World War II

Baymirza Hayit Mahmutmirzaoğlov (17 December 1917 – 31 October 2006), also spelled Boymirza Hayit Mahmutmirzaoğlov, was a historian and orientalist who specialised in the history of Turkestan and Central Asia.

== Life ==
Baymirza Hayit was born in Yargorgan, a village in the province of Namangan, located in Uzbekistan. Hayit was one of nine children raised by his mother Rabiya Hayit and his father Mirza Mahmutmirzaoğlov in a family of Uzbek origin. As an adolescent Hayit already showed interest in literature and arts. Despite the deprivations of the 1930s, he graduated from Tashkent University in 1939. The same year he was called into the Red Army, where he served as a lieutenant. Hayit left Namangan in December 1939 and was stationed in Poland as a squadron tank commander. During World War II, Hayit got into German captivity in 1941. Then he served as an officer in the Turkestan Legion of the German Wehrmacht. While serving in the legion he met the legendary Turkistani nationalist Mustafa Chokaev.

After the war Hayit settled down in West Germany, where he enrolled in the subjects science of history, orientalism and Islamic sciences at the University of Münster. Since then he was committed to the studies about his home region Turkestan. He received his PhD Doctor of Philosophy in 1950 and published his thesis “Die Nationalen Regierungen von Kokand und der Alasch Orda.” He married a young doctor from Cologne named Ruth in the same year. The couple had two sons, Ertay and Mirza, and a daughter, Dilber. From the 1950s until his death Hayit wrote dozens of articles and 15 acclaimed books in German, English, and Turkish on the history of Turkestan (the now independent republics of Turkmenistan, Kyrgyzstan, Kazakhstan, Uzbekistan and the Chinese province of Xinjiang).

His major works are "Turkestan im XX. Jahrhundert" (1956), "Sowjetrussische Orientpolitik am Beispiel Turkestans" (1962), "Die Wirtschaftsprobleme Turkestans", (1968), "Turkestan zwischen Russland und China", (1971) and "Basmatschi: Nationaler Kampf Turkestans in den Jahren 1917 bis 1934", (1992).

Hayit taught at several universities around the world. He worked as an assistant at the University of London, and he worked as a lecturer at Harvard University, Hacettepe University in Ankara, University of Istanbul and Marmara University in Istanbul.

Hayit was a strong advocate for the independence and unification of the Soviet and Chinese-controlled parts of Central Asia. His work was vilified in the Soviet Union. Even in independent Uzbekistan discussing it was controversial, and Hayit was vilified by president Islam Karimov for being a traitor to his motherland.

In other parts of the world his work was appreciated because of the huge political and historical relevance of his theses. Hayit was one of the very few historians who was committed to Turkestanian history at large. Especially in the Turkish-speaking world he gained a high reputation. In 2004 he was given an honorary doctorate for his lifetime work by the Technical University of Istanbul.

Hayit died at the age of 88 in Cologne on 31 October 2006.

== Partial list of published works ==
Works were published under the names Baymirza Hayit and B. Hayit.

=== Books ===
- “Die Nationalen Regierungen von Kokand und der Alasch Orda.” Ph.D. thesis for University of Münster, Munich, 1950.
- Sowjetrußische Orientpolitik am Beispiel Turkestan. Köln-Berlin: Kiepenhauer & Witsch, 1956
- Turkestan im XX Jahrhundert. Darmstadt: Leske, 1956
- Documents: Soviet Russia's Anti-Islam-Policy in Turkestan. Düsseldorf: Gerhard von Mende, 2 vols, 1958.
- Turkestan Zwischen Russland und China. Amsterdam: Philo Press, 1971
- Turkestan. Im Herzen Euroasiens. Studienverlag, 1980. ISBN 3-922145-50-7.
- Some thoughts on the problem of Turkestan, Institute of Turkestan Research, 1984
- Islam and Turkestan under Russian Rule. Istanbul: Can Matbaa, 1987.
- Basmatschi: Nationaler Kampf Turkestans in den Jahren 1917 bis 1934. Köln: Dreisam-Verlag, 1993. ISBN 3-89452-373-5; ISBN 3-89607-080-0.
- Berichte und Forschungen über Turkestan. Köln. 1997.
- Yeni Çag Türkistan tarihi kaynaklar. Turan Kültür Vakf, 2000 ISBN 975-7893-28-5

=== Articles ===
- “The Communist Party in Turkestan” London: Central Asian Review, 1957.
- “Turkestan as an Example of Soviet Colonialism” Studies on the Soviet Union. pp. 78–95 1961
- “Sowjetrußischer Kolonialismus und Imperialismus in Turkestan.” Oosterhout. 1962
- “Turkistanda Emir haqqinda yeni fikir carayanlari.” Milli Turkistan. No. 126. 1969.
- “Der Islam und die anti-islamische Bewegung in der Sowjetunion.” Osteuropa 22(2). 114–118. 1972
- “Turkistan: A case for national independence.” Journal of Muslim Minority Affairs. 1. pp. 38–50. 1979.
- “Turkestan im Herzen Euroasiens.” Studienverlag (1), 1980.
- “Western Turkestan: The Russian dilemma.” Journal of Muslim Minority Affairs. 6 (I) pp. 137–51. 1985
- “Turkestan als historischer Faktor und politische Idee.” Studienverlag 17 1988
