= Black Wolf Hubertus =

Black Wolf Hubertus (German: Schwarzer Wolf von Hubertus; Polish: Czarny Wilk Hubertus) was a post-war pro-German Nazi underground paramilitary organization active in Upper Silesia (1949 -1954). The group was founded by Manfred Lucia, a former member of the Hitler Youth, and was composed primarily of young ethnic Germans and Silesians.

== Background ==
After World War II, Upper Silesia became part of Poland under postwar territorial changes. The region had a significant German-speaking population, many of whom had been involved in Nazi organizations (e.g. Werwolf). In the immediate aftermath of the war, some individuals maintained pro-German sentiments and sought to resist the new Polish communist authorities.

== Activities ==
The group's activities included distributing anti-communist leaflets, sending threatening letters to Polish officials, and engaging in acts of sabotage. They also attempted to recruit former members of the Wehrmacht and the Hitler Youth to bolster their ranks. According to some sources, the organization composed of 96 Germans and Silesians.

One of the most significant incidents occurred on 21 July 1954, when members of Czarny Wilk Hubertus ambushed two officers of the Milicja Obywatelska (People's Militia, MO). The officers were beaten and disarmed. During the subsequent pursuit by security forces, three members of the group were killed, and one officer of the Milicja Obywatelska also lost his life.

== Aftermath ==
Following the 1954 incident, the Polish security services intensified their efforts to dismantle the organization. Lucia and several other members were arrested and tried. Lucia was sentenced to 15 years in prison, while other members received sentences ranging from two to fourteen years.

The activities of Czarny Wilk Hubertus were part of a broader pattern of resistance by former Nazi sympathizers in post-war Silesia. The group's suppression marked the end of organized pro-Nazi underground activity in the region during that period.
