= Abdurrahman Fatalibeyli =

Soviet soldier who defected during World War II (1908–1954)

Abdurrahman Fatalibeyli-Dudanginsky
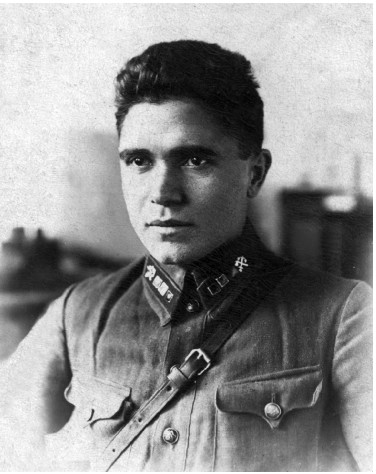
- Fatalibeyli-Dudanginsky in the Red Army
- Born: 12 June 1908; Dudanga, Erivan Governorate, Russian Empire
- Died: 22 November 1954 (aged 46); Munich, West Germany
- Burial place: Cemetery of Neu-Ulm Germany
- Military career
- Allegiance: Soviet Union; Nazi Germany
- Branch: Red Army; Wehrmacht; Heer
- Service years: (Soviet Union) 1939–1941; (Nazi Germany) 1943–1945
- Rank: (Soviet Union) Major; (Nazi Germany) Major
- Nickname: Fetheli Bey
- Units: 804th "Aslan" Battalion; 807th "Igit" Battalion
- Conflicts: Winter War; World War II; Eastern Front
- Other work: Radio Liberty

Abdurrahman Fatalibeyli (birth surname Dudanginski, (Russian: Абдулрахман Фаталибейли-Дудангинский, Azerbaijani: Əbdürrəhman bəy Fətəlibəyli-Düdənginski) or Abo Alioglu Fatalibeyli-Dudanginsky Або Алиевич Дудангинский / Əbo Əliyeviç Düdənginski), born Abo Dudanginski (12 June 1908 – 22 November 1954), was a Soviet army major who defected to the German forces during World War II.

== Life ==
=== Soviet Union ===
Fatalibeyli was born in the village of Dudanga (near present-day Sharur, Nakhchivan). He studied in various public and military schools in Baku. He moved to Leningrad, where he joined the Communist Party to enter the Military Engineering School and studied there for three years. His classmate from the Chief of Staff Academy years future Marshal of Soviet Union, Minister of Defense of USSR Andrey Grechko said the following about Fatalibeyli: "He possessed with incredibly sharp intelligence and analytical thinking. He was a commander by birth. In the questions of military tactics, none of us could compare to him."

In 1936, Fatalibeyli was expelled from the party due to having lied about his social origins and having reported himself to be of peasant stock. He later participated in the Soviet-Finnish War of 1939, receiving the Order of the Red Star. He became major in 1941, but was captured by German troops in the Baltic front in September 1941 and sent to a prisoner of war camp.

=== Nazi Germany ===
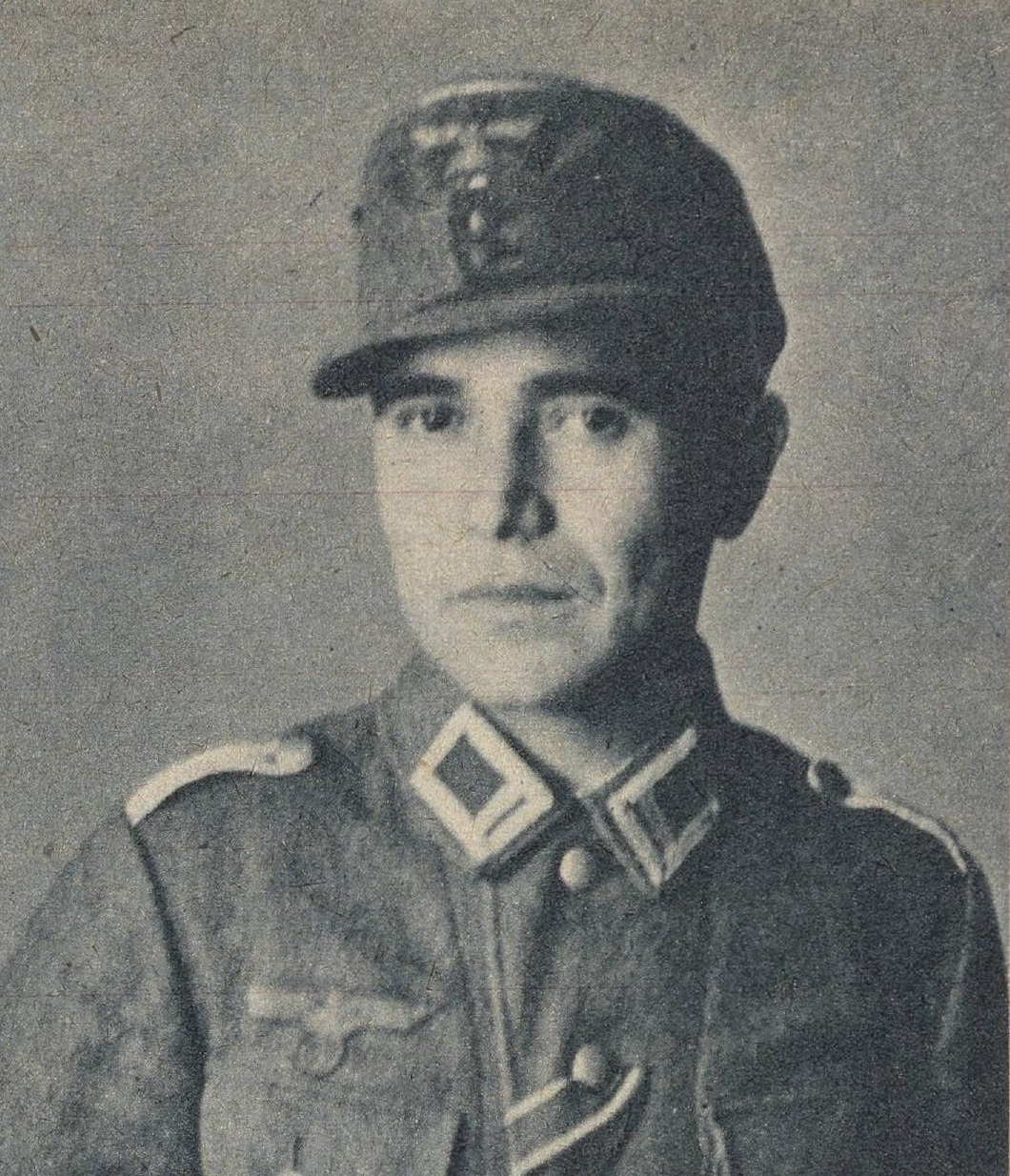
Fatalibeyli-Dudanginsky in Wehrmacht

After (or during) imprisonment in Poland, he joined the Wehrmacht and became an interpreter of SD officer and the deputy commander of the Einsatzgruppe D SS-Obersturmführer Heinz Schubert in North Caucasus, but according to Cabbar Ertürk who was elected as the responsible for cultural affairs of the Azerbaijan National Committee in Berlin, his "Turkish language" was poor. When the Caucasus Campaign began in August 1942, he participated in the 804th Infantry Battalion "Aslan" of the Azerbaijani Legion (literally "Lion Battalion") as a staff officer of its commander Major Dr. Gloger. The battalion belonged to the 4th Mountain Division of the 17th Army. The "Aslan" battalion advanced from Rostov-na-Donu to Armavir, and then to Malaya Laba River (Малая Лаба) and Bagovskaya (Баговская). After the death of Dr. Gloger on 4 February 1943, when the battalion retreated to the Kuban bridgehead (Kuban-Brückenkopf ), Fatalibeyli-Dudanginsky temporarily commanded the battalion until Captain Haverland was appointed as the new commander in late March. And later he served for the 806th Infantry Battalion "Igit" (literally "Brave Battalion") and I/73rd. While fighting guerrilla attacks, he received the Iron Cross and promoted to major of the German military in 1943.

He was head of the Azerbaijan National Committee and one of the architects of the Azerbaijani Legion helped by Mohammad Amin al-Husayni, Mufti of Jerusalem, and several Moslem collaborators, such as Alikhan Kantemir (North Caucasus), Dr. Szynkiewicz, mufti of the Ostland zone occupied by the Germans (Poland and occupied areas of the USSR), and Mohammed Al Gazani, Muslim poet and one of the chiefs of the anti-Soviet Moslem Union.

In November 1943, a broadcast of radio DNB (Deutsche Nachrichten Büro) announced that the first battalion of Azerbaijanis, which had actively fought against the Bolshevism during more than one year, "proved their valor, and were included in German Storm Troops and decorated by the German Army." It was also announced that a conference about Azerbaijan had taken place in Berlin on 7 November under the command of major Dudanginski. A dispatch dated 16 November 1943, mentioned specifically that this conference had been followed "by the Mufti of Jerusalem" and "the representatives of the peoples of the Caucasus, the Ural and Turkestan."

More than 700 Azeris participated in the battle of Berlin in 1945. Abo surrendered to Allied forces, and began to work for American intelligence. After the war, Fatalibeyli was cleared by the U.S. War Department's Office of Strategic Services (OSS), a forerunner to the Central Intelligence Agency.

=== Cold War ===
By 1948, he had been invited to Egypt and was a military adviser to the Arabs during the 1948 Arab–Israeli War.

In 1953 he began working for CIA-funded Radio Liberty in Munich, becoming chief of the Azerbaijani desk. In September 1954, the body of Leonid Karas, a Belarusian writer, was found in the Isar River near Munich. Two months later (on 24 November), Fatalibeyli was found garroted in the apartment of Mikhail Izmailov. Although never conclusively proved, KGB involvement was suspected in both cases. The last living contemporary witness, Beschir Alizade, working with Fatalibeyli at Radio Liberty, died on 16 January 2016 in Neu-Ulm. To protect himself from the KGB, he changed his name from formerly "Mirhashim Alijev" to Beshir Alizade. The family only found out about this in 2021 when his son Aydin visited the family in Azerbaijan.

== See also ==
- Aserbaidschanische Legion
- Azeri SS volunteer formations
