= Tatar Legions =

Tatar Legions: 1941, Germany

The Tatar Legions were auxiliary units of the Waffen-SS formed after the German invasion of the Soviet Union in 1941.

It included:

1. Crimean Tatar Legion, comprising Crimean Tatars, Qarays, Nogais
2. Volga Tatar Legion, which included also Bashkirs, Chuvashes, Mari, Udmurt, Mordwa

== See also ==
- Turkestan Legion
- Azeri Waffen SS Volunteer Formations
