= Düdəngə =

- Municipality
- Location within Azerbaijan
- Coordinates: 39°34′19″N 44°59′47″E
- Country: Azerbaijan
- Autonomous republic: Nakhchivan
- District: Sharur

Population (2005)
  - Total: 4,012
- Time zone: UTC+4 (AZT)

Düdəngə (also, Dudangya and Dyudengya) is a village and municipality in the Sharur District of Nakhchivan Autonomous Republic, Azerbaijan. It is located next to the district center. Primary occupation of Its population is farming and animal husbandry. There are secondary school, club and a medical center in the village. It has a population of 4,012.

== Etymology ==
The name of the Dudəngə village was made out from the Iranian origin words of dü (two) and dəngə (block, part of the city) means "village with two blocks".

== People from Düdəngə ==
- Abdurrahman Fatalibeyli
