= Kerim Oder =

Azerbaijani politician

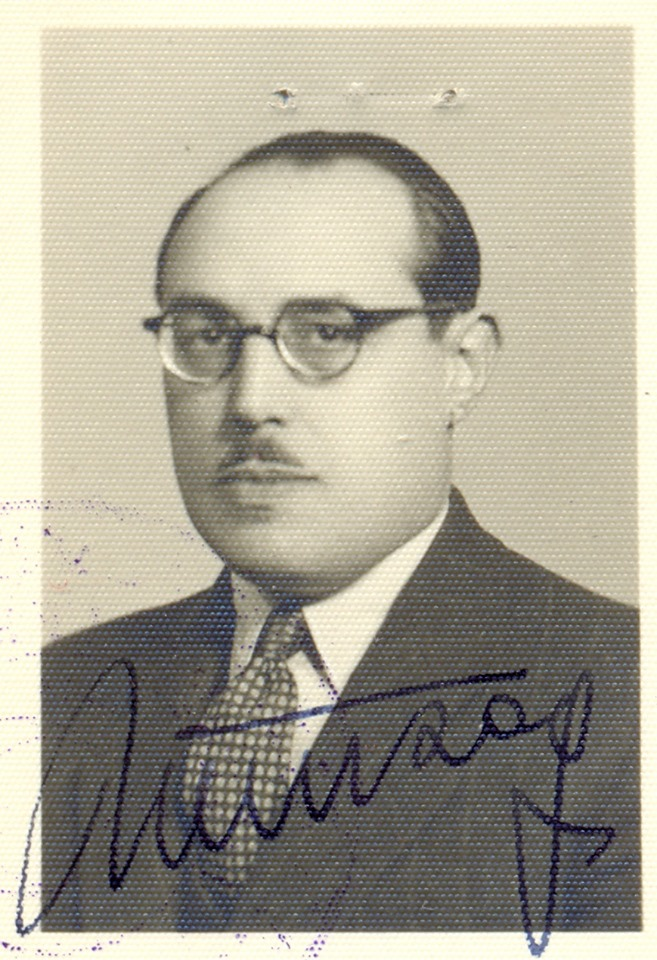
- Born: 1901; Baku, Russian Empire
- Died: 19 November 1981 (aged 79–80); Ankara, Republic of Turkiye
- Citizenship: Russian Empire; Azerbaijan Democratic Republic; Republic of Turkiye
- Occupation: Politician

Kerim Oder (1901 – 19 November 1981) Azerbaijani politician, public official in the Azerbaijan Democratic Republic, economist, the third chairman of the Musavat Party, one of the active members of the Azerbaijani emigration.

== Life ==
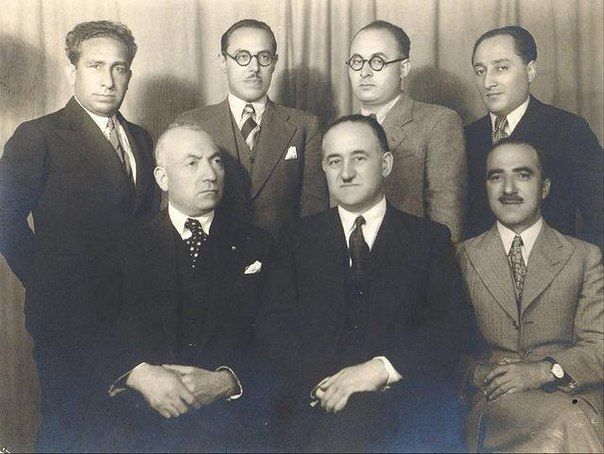
Azerbaijani political emigrants, c. 1930s. Standing (from left to right): Mirzabala Mammadzadeh, Kerim Oder, Ali Azertekin, Hilal Munshi. Sitting: Abbasgulu Kazimzadeh, Mahammad Amin Rasulzade, Khosrov bey Sultanov

Kerim Oder was born in 1901 in Baku. His father is Ibadullah Zeynalzade, and his mother is Agabaji Khanim. Kerim graduated from a commercial school in Baku. After the declaration of independence of the Azerbaijan Democratic Republic, he worked in the Ministry of Foreign Affairs. After the occupation of Azerbaijan by the Bolsheviks, he left for Tiflis. After the occupation of Georgia by the Bolsheviks, he escaped to Batumi. From here, with a group of 10-12 people, he travels by boat to Turkey and receives asylum here.

After doing business in Turkey for some time, he became a citizen of Turkey and worked at Osmanli Bank for 7 years. During this period, he managed to rise to the position of deputy manager of the Ottoman Bank. After that, he worked at the Central Bank of Turkey and Sümerbank, and retired in 1966. Oder was the Chairman of the Party Assembly of the Musavat Party, and at the same time he was the Honorary Chairman of the Azerbaijan Cultural Association. In 1976, after the death of the President of the Azerbaijan National Center, Abdulvahab Yurdsevar, the President of the center was entrusted to Kerim Oder.

Kerim Oder was one of the most active members of the Azerbaijani emigration. A large number of articles on this subject have been published in "Azerbaijan" magazine. The most famous works are "Economy of Azerbaijan" and "Azerbaijan". The book "Azerbaijan" was published after his death.

Kerim Oder was fluent in Russian and French, and moderately fluent in Persian, German and English.
