= Bergmann Battalion =

Military unit

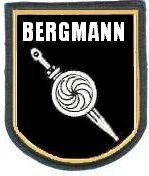
Caucasian dagger symbol of Sonderverband Bergmann

The Special Group Bergmann or the Bergmann Battalion (German: Sonderverband Bergmann) was a military unit of the German Abwehr during World War II, composed of five German-officered companies of the Caucasian volunteers.

== History ==
The Bergmann battalion was formed of the émigrés and Soviet POWs from the Caucasian republics at Neuhammer in October 1941. Subordinated to the German commando battalion Bau-Lehr-Bataillons z.b.V. 800 and placed under the command of Oberleutnant Theodor Oberländer, the unit received training at Neuhammer and Mittenwald. Later a special 130-men-strong Georgian contingent of Abwehr codenamed "Tamara-II" was incorporated into Bergmann. By March 1942, there were five companies of some 300 Germans and 900 Caucasians:

1. Georgian and German cadre personnel
2. North Caucasians
3. Azerbaijanis
4. Georgians and Armenians
5. Staff company, composed of 130 Georgian émigrés

In August 1942, Bergmann went to the Eastern Front, where it saw its first action in the North Caucasus campaign in August 1942. The unit engaged in anti-partisan actions in the Mozdok-Nalchik-Mineralnye Vody area and conducted reconnaissance and subversion in the Grozny area. At the end of 1942, Bergmann conducted a successful sortie through the Soviet lines, bringing with them some 300 Red Army defectors, and covered the German retreat from the Caucasus. Bergmann went through a series of hard-fought engagements with the Soviet partisans and regular forces in the Crimea in February 1943. After the formation of separate battalions, several of these were dispatched to Greece. The Azeri II. Battalion covered the retreat from Russia and was deployed to Warsaw after the onset of the Uprising 1944 to fight with the Dirlewanger unit. There and in subsequent engagements with the Red Army, it suffered heavy casualties, and surviving soldiers of II./Bergmann, together with Azeri from another Wehrmacht unit (I./111), formed the III. Battalion of the new Grenadier-Regiment 1607 (27 March 1945). They saw the end of the war at the West coast of Denmark.

The Bergmann group used as insignia a traditional Caucasian dagger (kinzhal) with curving blade, worn on the left side of the cap. Made of yellow metal, it was 7 cm long.

== See also ==
- Armenische Legion
- Aserbaidschanische Legion
- Azeri Waffen SS Volunteer Formations
- Georgische Legion
- Kaukasisch-Mohammedanische Legion
- Nachtigall Battalion
