= Osteuropa (magazine) =

German scientific journal

- Discipline: Natural sciences
- Language: German language

Publication details
- History: 1925–present
- Publisher: BWV Berliner Wissenschafts-Verlag (Germany)
- Frequency: Monthly
- Open access: Hybrid

Standard abbreviations
- ISO 4: Osteuropa

Indexing
- ISSN: 0030-6428 (print); 2509-3444 (web)

Links
- Journal homepage

Osteuropa is an "interdisciplinary academic monthly on international affairs and one of the leading international journals in the field of research on Eastern Europe".

It is published by the Berlin-based Deutsche Gesellschaft für Osteuropakunde (German Association for the Study of Eastern Europe, DGO).

== History ==
The journal was founded in 1954 by the German Society for Eastern European Studies to discuss current problems of the legal systems and jurisprudence in Eastern European countries.

Since 1966 the editorial work has been entrusted to the Institute of Eastern European and Comparative Law at the University of Cologne.

The journal's focus is on the legal developments in the countries of Central and Eastern Europe as well as the CIS States.

== Publication ==
Since 1951, Osteuropa has been published by the German Association for East European Studies in Berlin.

=== Editors ===
The journal was founded in Berlin in 1925 by Otto Hoetzsch. It ceased publication in 1939 following the invasion of Poland and was re-established in 1951. From 1951 to 1975, the journal was edited by Klaus Mehnert, then by Alexander Steininger until 2002, and since then by Manfred Sapper.

== Subject matter ==
Osteuropa regularly publishes special issues on specific topics. These include the armed conflicts in Ukraine and the Caucasus, the new authoritarianism in Russia, Hungary and elsewhere, memory politics (World War I and II, Soviet camps) and environmental policy matters.
