= Ali Azertekin =

Azerbaijani journalist

- Born: 1905; Baku, Russian Empire
- Died: 1967; Istanbul, Turkey

Ali Azertekin (Azerbaijani: Əli Azərtəkin; 1905, Baku - 1967, Istanbul) was an Azerbaijani teacher, publicist, public figure of the Azerbaijani émigrée.

== Life ==
Ali Azertekin was born in 1905 in Baku in the family of Iskander Taghizade. His mother was a close relative of the poet Samed Mansur Kazimzade. Ali Azertekin was educated at the Pedagogical University of Baku. After graduating, he worked in Ganja and became a member of the secret Musavat party. In 1928, Azertekin left for Iran because of the persecution of members of the Musavat party. While in Tabriz, he contacts Mahammad Ali Rasulzade, who was in Tehran at that time, and through him met with Shevket Esendal, the former Turkish ambassador to Azerbaijan, who helps him left for Istanbul.

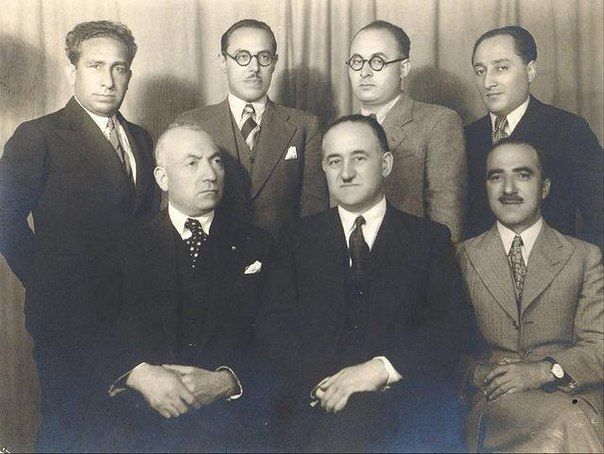
Azerbaijani political emigrants, c. 1930s. Standing (from left to right): Mirzabala Mammadzadeh, Karim Odar, Ali Azertekin, Hilal Munshi. Sitting: Abbasgulu Kazimzadeh, Mahammad Amin Rasulzade, Khosrov bey Sultanov

In Istanbul, Ali Azertekin received a philological education. In 1933, at the suggestion of Mirzabala Mahammadzade, Mahammad Amin Rasulzade invited Azertekin to Warsaw, where he took up journalism. Ali Azertekin worked for the Istiqlal, Azerbaijan and the Kurtulush magazines, which were published by Musavat. In 1936, he also participated in the conference of the Musavat party in Warsaw. With the outbreak of World War II, Ali Azertekin left for Tehran. He was arrested during Ali Soheili's government, close to the Soviet Union, and remained in custody until the end of the war. Azertekin was sent to Cairo by the British military to escape the persecution of the Russians. Finally, in 1943, he returned to Iran again, but this time he was arrested by the Soheili government, which was close to the Soviets, and remained in prison until the end of the war. Ali Azertekin was released from prison with the intervention of Mohammad Saed's office. Until 1956 he lived in Iran, then returned to Istanbul. He wrote articles under the signature "AT" in Azertek's "Istiqlal" newspaper and "Kurtuluş" magazine. After coming to Turkey for the last time, he prepared articles for "Azerbaijan" magazine. He also worked as a translator during his emigration. Azertekin translated Russian materials into Turkish for the journal "Dargi" published in Munich and published by the American Institute for the Study of the Soviet Union. In addition to Russian, he also learned Polish and Persian languages.

Ali Azertekin died on October 20, 1967, at 20:00 in the Istanbul district of Haydarpasha. After a funeral prayer in the Osmanaga mosque, on October 21 he was buried in the Karajaahmed cemetery, not far from the grave of Mirzabala Mahammadzade.

== See also ==
- Mahammad Amin Rasulzade
