= Armenian Legion =

Armenische Legion Armenian Legion
- Patch of the legion
- Active: 4 July 1942 – 8 June 1944
- Size: 11,600 – 33,000 troops
- Engagements: World War II; Eastern Front

Commanders
- Ceremonial chief: Drastamat Kanayan

The Armenian Legion (German: Armenische Legion; Armenian: Հայկական լեգիոն, romanized: Haykakan legion) was a military unit in the German Army during World War II. It primarily consisted of Soviet Armenians, who wanted to fight the Soviets for an independent Armenia and commanded by General Drastamat Kanayan.

== 812th Battalion ==
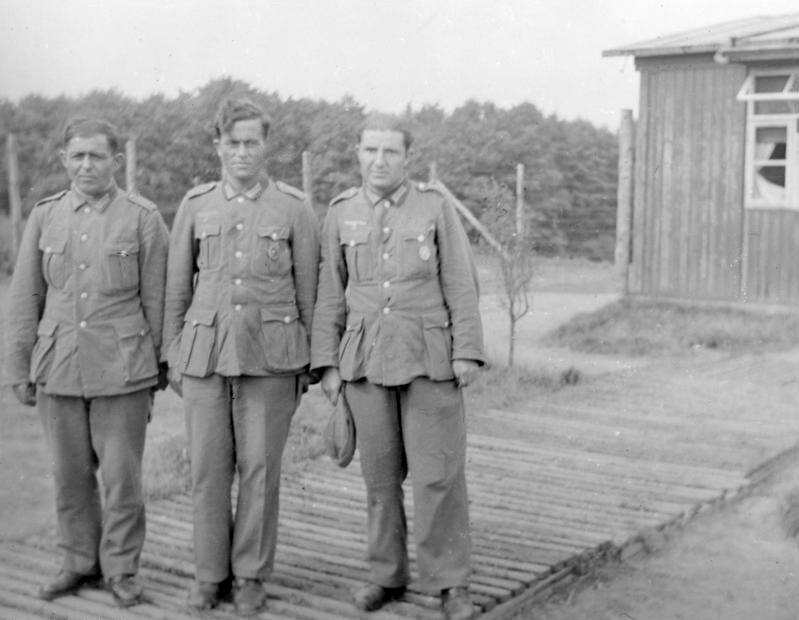
Armenian soldiers.

The short-lived Republic of Armenia, established in 1918, was occupied by the Russian Bolsheviks in 1920 and incorporated shortly after into the Soviet Union. This was something which members of the Armenian Revolutionary Federation (ARF; Dashnaks) political party never reconciled themselves with, as many of them were imprisoned, killed, or expelled by Soviet authorities following the Soviet takeover.

In 1942, in order to fight Turkey's anti-Armenian politicking, a number of Dashnaks entered into negotiations with Berlin, and reluctantly agreed to participate in the formation of a military legion. This was a move, however, that was officially repudiated by ARF party organs.

The majority of the soldiers in the 812th Battalion legion were drawn from the ranks of the Red Army, prisoners of war who had opted to fight for the German Army rather than face the brutal conditions of the Nazi POW camps, though a number of Armenian veterans who had escaped to the United States after World War I also came back to Europe to join it. Command of the unit was given to a former Defense Minister of Armenia, General Drastamat Kanayan (Dro). Kanayan was among the minority in the legion who volunteered, under the hope of freeing Soviet Armenia from the control of Moscow.

Through the span of active service, the 812th Battalion participated in the occupation of the Crimean Peninsula and the North Caucasus. One unit comprising a part of the Armenian Legion, was the 4th Battalion of the 918th Grenadier Regiment, 242 Infanterie-Division, one of the few Eastern Legion units to be given German insignia after March 18, 1944. The battalion participated in the unsuccessful defense of Toulon.

At the end of the war, morale among the men in the unit began to collapse; many in the legion deserted or defected. Hans Houterman reported that in one case, a battalion in the Netherlands where the legion was stationed even revolted. Many men surrendered to the Western Allied forces. If not detained by them, they were turned over to Soviet authorities who, in accordance with an order proclaimed by Joseph Stalin, sent them to camps in Siberia as punishment for surrendering to Axis forces and "allowing themselves to be captured", a fate suffered by nearly all of the former Soviet prisoners of the war.

Several Jewish Red Army POWs were saved by some of the Armenians in the Legion and there were several instances of Jews being sent to the battalion to evade detection by the Nazis. Josef Moisevich Kogan, a Red Army soldier captured by the Germans, for example, stated that he received help by an Armenian doctor in the 812th Battalion when he was snuck into the battalion itself, later escaping with the help of the Dutch underground.

== Other Armenian infantry battalions ==
There were a number of other units that Armenians also served in aside from the 812th Battalion, their total number, according to Joris Versteeg, reaching 33,000. Of these, 14,000 were placed in field battalions, while another 7,000 served in logistical and other non-combat units. Ailsby puts the number of Armenians in "the legions and replacement battalions" closer to 11,600. The other units included:

808th Battalion

- Formed in July 1942 in Poland. Consisted of 916 Armenians and 41 Germans. Participated in the battles in the area of Tuapse. In October 1942, the battalion was disarmed and re-formed into a road construction unit.

809th Battalion "Zeytun"

- Formed on 29 August 1942 in Poland. Consisted of 913 Armenians and 45 Germans. Part of the 128th Grenadier Regiment, 48th Infantry Division. Led by commander Hermann Becker. On 18 November 1942, was sent to join operations in the Caucasus. Participated in the battles in the areas of Nalchik, Mozdok, Kuban and the Battle of the Kerch Peninsula. Later served in the Netherlands, and on 16 October 1943 the battalion arrived in Belgium.

From 29 November to 20 December 1943, the battalion conducted training exercises at the training ground in Sissonne. On 8 January 1944, it was moved to South Beveland and occupied a defensive line for the defense of the Atlantic Wall. The number of all personnel at the beginning of February 1944 the year was 844, consisting of 792 Armenians.

The battalion was transferred to Normandy in August 1944, where as a result of the Allied Operation Overlord ceased to exist due to large losses.

810th Battalion

- Formed in 1942 in Poland.

812th Engineering Battalion

- Began organization on 25 November 1942 and was finally formed on 1 February 1943 in the city of Puławy, Poland. The battalion service in the Polish city of Radom. It was relocated on 10 March 1943 to the Netherlands in order to strengthen the defense capability of the Atlantic Wall and was placed near the town of Bergen op Zoom. The battalion had its own priest and the ability to carrying out religious activities. Strictly in accordance with the Armenian calendar, the battalion observed Christian holidays and baptisms were held.
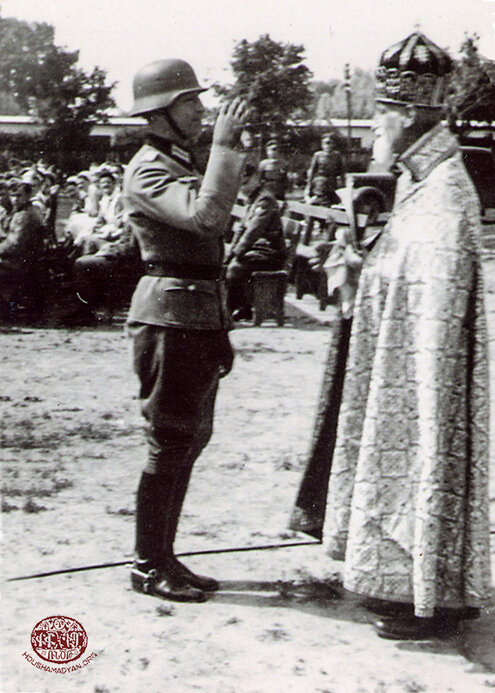
  Armenian Legion soldier of the 812th Engineering Battalion during a Mass service in 1943 officiated by Father Yeghishe Utudjian.

813th Battalion

- Formed in February 1943 in Poland. Served on protecting the Atlantic Wall.

814th Battalion

- Formed in the summer of 1943 in Poland.

815th Battalion

- Formed in August 1943 in Poland.

816th Battalion

- Formed in late 1943 in Poland.

I / 125 Battalion

- Formed in February 1943 in Ukraine. Was transferred to the Western Front to defend the south of France, located 30 kilometers north of the city of Marseille, near the town of Aix-en-Provence.

I / 198 Battalion

- Formed in September 1942 in Ukraine. Was transferred to the Western Front to defend the south of France, located on the south-west of Toulon.

II / 9 Battalion

- Formed in September 1942 in Ukraine. Was transferred to the Western Front to defend the south of France, located in the small town of Hyères, in the direction of Saint-Tropez by the coast.

== Nazi racial perspective ==
Although the Nazis acknowledged Armenians as Aryans, Adolf Hitler still espoused little trust in them. Minister of the Occupied Territories and Racial Theorist Alfred Rosenberg declared that the Armenians are Aryans, and thus they were immediately subject to conscription. According to Versteeg, however, "Although Armenians officially were considered 'Aryans', the notion of them being 'Levantine traders', similar to the Jews, was deep-seated in Nazi circles, and racial 'purists' along with Hitler himself were prone to look upon the Armenians as 'non-Aryans.'" Speaking about military units from Soviet peoples, Hitler said: "I don't know about these Georgians. They do not belong to the Turkic peoples...I consider only the Muslims to be reliable...All others I deem unreliable. For the time being I consider the formation of these battalions of purely Caucasian peoples very risky, while I don't see any danger in the establishment of purely Muslim units...In spite of all declarations from Rosenberg and the military, I don't trust the Armenians either." The 809th Battalion from 1943 on was stationed in the Netherlands.

== Rank insignia ==
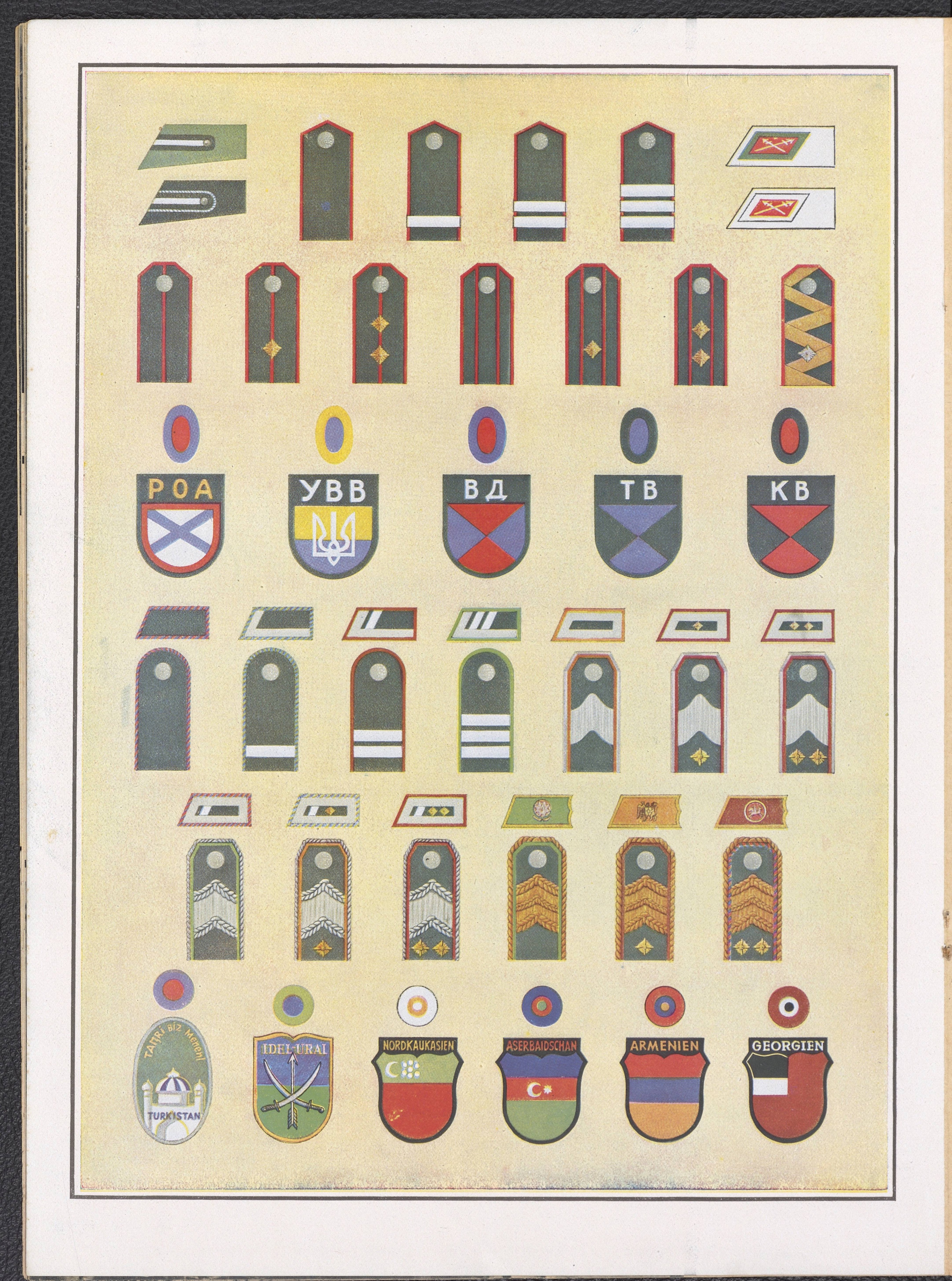
Second set of insignia depicts Turkestan, Caucasian, and Volga Tatar Units patches and rank badges.

With the "Provisions for the establishment of the Eastern Legions" of 24 April 1942, members of the Eastern Legions were to wear German Army uniforms with the German Eagle. Russians, Ukrainians, and Belarusians were allowed German uniform, but not the German eagle. Neither German military ranks, nor German rank insignia were, however, to be used. Members of the Eastern Legions were given positional insignia, denoting which position in the command hierarchy held. The following positions were used in the Eastern Legions: stellvertretender Gruppenführer (assistant squad leader), Gruppenführer (squad leader), stellvertretender Zugführer (assistant platoon leader), Zugführer (platoon leader), stellvertretender Kompanieführer (assistant company commander), Kompanieführer (company commander).

According to OKH Instruction 8a/3 29.4.1943, all in closed formations or as Hilfswilliger employed Armenian soldiers in the Wehrmacht/Heer would collectively be known as the Armenian Legion. In May 1943 rank insignia of Czarist Russian type were introduced, followed in December 1943 by those shown in the tables below.

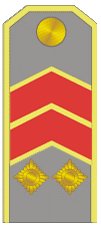
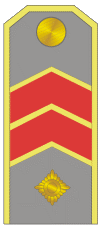
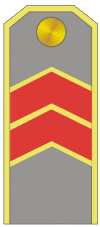
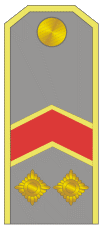
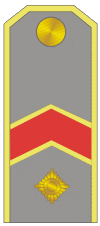
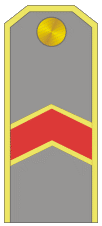
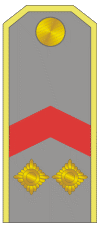
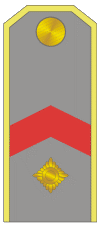
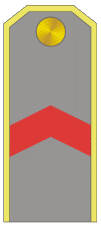
1943	Generäle			Stabsoffiziere			Hauptleute	Leutnante
Collar insignia
Shoulder insignia
	General der waffengattung	Generalleutnant	Generalmajor	Oberst	Oberstleutnant	Major	Hauptmann	Oberleutnant	Leutnant

1943	Unteroffiziere mit Portepee	Unteroffiziere ohne Portepee	Mannschaften
Collar insignia
Shoulder insignia
	Feldwebel	Unteroffizier	Gefreiter	Grenadier

== See also ==
- Turkestan Legion
- Azerbaijani Legion
- Georgian Legion (1915–1918)
- Georgian Legion (1941–1945)
- Ostlegionen
