= Azerbaijani SS volunteer formations =

1944–45 Nazi German units

Azerbaijani SS volunteer formations were recruited from captured Azerbaijani prisoners of war from the Red Army, which was the military force of Soviet Union. Twenty years before World War II and Operation Barbarossa, the USSR had invaded Azerbaijan and sovietized it during the occupation into the Azerbaijan Soviet Socialist Republic. An estimated 600,000 Azerbaijanis were recruited into the Soviet Army during the war.

== Origins ==
In November 1943, Austrian Major Andreas Meyer-Mader of the 444th Battalion offered his services to Himmler to help raise and command a Turkic SS unit. Himmler approved the broad plan and then transferred him into the ranks of the Waffen-SS and promoted him to the rank of SS-Obersturmbannführer.

Then, on 14 December, a meeting was held in Berlin in the presence of the Grand Mufti of Jerusalem, Amin al-Husseini. The Grand Mufti approved the plan to raise a Turkic-Muslim SS division and to give his "spiritual leadership" to influence the Muslim volunteers.

== East Muslim SS Regiment ==
Between November 1943 and January 1944, there was a series of meetings between Meyer-Mader and Muslim volunteers. As a result of these meetings, on January 4, 1944, it was decided to form the East Muslim SS Regiment (Ostmuselmanisches SS-Regiment). At the same meeting, it was decided to disband the following Wehrmacht's Osttruppen battalions who would serve as a basis for a new platform: 450th, 480th, 782nd, 786th, 790th, 791st and I/94th Turkestanische battalions, Azerbaijani 818th and Volga Tatar 831st. Many of the volunteers deserted at this time, and the 818th defected to Polish and Ukrainian resistance movements in 1943.

Furthermore, at the same time, Meyer-Mader visited prisoners of war camps and called for volunteers to join the new Muslim SS legion. The recruits were not only Turkestani but also Azerbaijani, Kyrgyz, Uzbek, and Tajik. By the end of January 1944, he was able to recruit 3,000 volunteers who were concentrated in Poniatowa. To increase the staffing regiment, dozens of German officers and non-commissioned officers were transferred there. Nevertheless, it was a prolonged process, mainly due to a lack of equipment, including uniforms and even shoes. Therefore, by the October 1944 deadline, which Himmler appointed for the deployment of divisions, the regiment had only 4,000 people formed into 3 battalions.

The unit was formed in Trawniki, Poland, before they were transferred to Byelorussia for further training. SS-Obersturmbannführer Andreas Meyer-Mader was appointed as its first commander.

This unit suffered from poor discipline, and poor morale, especially after Meyer-Mader was killed during a skirmish with partisans in Yuratishki, near Minsk, on March 28, 1944. The situation worsened when the replacement commander, SS-Hauptsturmführer Billig, executed 78 unit members for insubordination. This incident angered Himmler, who relieved Billig. In May 1944, the 550 men (Turkestanis, Volga Tatars, Azerbaijanis, Kyrgyz, Uzbeks, and Tajiks) from the Ostmuslemanische SS-Regiment were attached to the SS-Sonderregiment Dirlewanger.

== Warsaw ==
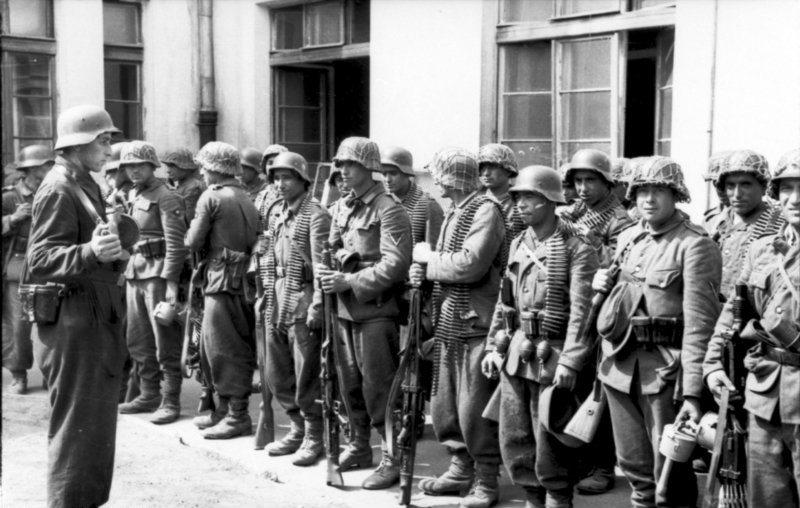
Soldiers of Azerbaijani Feld-Bataillon I./111 during the Warsaw Uprising

On January 29, 1944, Heinz Reinefarth was assigned as SS and Police Leader in Reichsgau Wartheland (the pre-war Polish Poznań Voivodeship, annexed by Germany in 1939). In this post, he was responsible for the organised repression against Poles and other nationalities deprived of all rights by Germany. After the outbreak of the Warsaw Uprising, Reinefarth was ordered to organise a military unit from the 16th Police Company and other smaller security units and head for Warsaw. Upon arrival, his forces were included in the Korpsgruppe Von Dem Bach of General Erich von dem Bach-Zelewski who Himmler ordered to quell the rebellion.

From August 5, 1944, Reinefarth's group fought in the Wola area. In several days, his and Dirlewanger's soldiers executed approximately 40,000 civilian inhabitants of Warsaw in what is now known as the Wola massacre. The Wola killings were mostly inflicted by Kampfgruppe Reinefarth that assaulted the area held by the insurgents from the west.

It is hard to determine which specific units are to be held responsible, but the main “cleansing” tasks had been assigned to Angriffsgruppe Dirlewanger with following forces:

- Ostmuselmanisches SS Regiment (without Battalion III),
- 2 Grenadier Battalions (I & II) of SS Sonderregiment Dirlewanger,
- Aserbeidschanisches Feld Bataillon I./111 (com. Hptm. Werner Scharrenberg),
- Komp. I & II of Aserb. Feld Btl. I/111,
- a part of machine gun 4. Kompanie of Aserb. Feld Btl. I/111,
- II Btl. "Bergmann" – (without 7. Komp.) Ltn. Mertelsmann,
- Gendermerie Operationsgruppe Walter (2 gendarmerie Komp.),
- Anti-aircraft battery of 80th Regiment,
- Sturmpanzer-Kompanie z.b.V. 218 (8x Brummbär) Hptm. Kellmann,
- 1. Platoon of 654. Pionier Battalion,
- 1 KRONE flamethrower unit (8x Flammenwerfer 41)

Lack of precise documentation does not allow to specify precisely which elements of the above were involved in the Wola killing. It is also possible that some units of the other assault group that operated in the Wola area (Angriffsgruppe Reck) were taking active part in the events, as they also consisted of police/gendarmerie and special assignment units (Hptm. Kirchhubel's Warschau Polizei Kompanie, Hptm. Fersemann's Polizei Wachtkompanie, platoon of SS-Röntgen MG Kompanie from Poznań, but also SS Grenadiere of SS-Schule Treskau and Azerbaijani 7.Komp/II Bt. Bergmann).

== Osttürkische Waffen-Verbände der SS ==
On October 20, 1944, the rest of the Ostmuselmanisches SS-Regiment was transferred from Ukraine to Slovakia and renamed "Osttürkische Waffen-Verbände der SS" and reorganized into 3 battalions organized along ethnic lines.

- Waffengruppe Turkestan
- Waffengruppe Aserbeidschan (2,851 soldiers: Gerhard von Mende archives)
- Waffengruppe Idel-Ural

Each battalion would consist of staff, one staff company and 5 infantry companies. The Ostmuselmanisches regiment was integrated into the Osttürkische Waffen-Verbände der SS and was considered to be dissolved. In December 1944, the Waffen-Gruppe Aserbeidschan (commander W-Ostuf Kerrar Alesgerli) was transferred to the Kaukasiche Waffen-Verbände der SS. The disbanded Tatar Waffen Gebirgs Brigade der SS would replace the Azerbaijani soldiers; Commander: SS-Standartenführer Harun el-Raschid Hintersatz. (born Wilhelm Hintersatz (A German officer, born in Senftenberg, Lausitz, who had converted to Islam in 1919.)

The reorganisations began in January 1945 as follows:

- SS-Waffengruppe Turkestan
- SS-Waffengruppe Krim
- SS-Waffengruppe Idel Urals

Apparently, new “volunteers” were integrated because the Osttürkische Waffen-Verbände had increased from 5,000 men in January 1945 to 8,500 men in the period of February–May 1945. As Hitler's Reich crumbled, the Waffen-SS gave up all adherence to standards for recruit selection. If they could walk and shoot a rifle, they were good enough for the SS. At this time, all German military forces were scraping the bottom of the manpower barrel - for example, in January 1945, Heer and Waffen-SS recruiting centres were combined. Waffen-SS troops were increasingly transfers from other military branches of the Wehrmacht from paramilitary and labour formations. The whole unit arrived in March 1945 in Merate, 30 km north of Milan, northern Italy. Assigned to the area's defence, the Osttürkische Waffen-Verbände apparently participated in no larger operation against partisans. On 26 April 1945, Hintersatz signed a pact with the local partisan command, according to which the soldiers would remain in the barracks in Merate until the US troops arrived. This happened on 30 April 1945, the whole unit went into the 1st Armored Division's hands.

== Kaukasischer Waffen-Verband der SS ==
In December 1944, while training in Slovakia, a rumour that the unit was to be transferred to Russian Liberation Army demoralized the soldiers. On December 24, 450 men deserted on Christmas Eve, although 300 eventually returned. The Azerberjani regiment was removed from the Osttürkische Waffen-Verbände on 30 December 1944, and transferred to Kaukasischer Waffen-Verband der SS.

Kaukasischer Waffen-Verband der SS, also known as Freiwilligen Brigade Nordkaukasien, began forming with volunteers from the Caucasus region, with the Freiwilligen-Stamm-Division as a nucleus. It was transferred from the Neuhammer training camp to Paluzza in northern Italy in Jan. 1945 and was still forming when it surrendered to British forces at the end of the war.

- Commander: SS-Standartenführer Arved Theuermann

Organisation:

- Stab Kaukasischer Waffen-Verband der SS
- Stab Waffen-Gruppe Armenien
- Stab Waffen-Gruppe Nordkaukasus
- Stab Waffen-Gruppe Georgien
- Stab Waffen-Gruppe Aserbeidschan (1090 soldiers: Gerhard von Mende archives)

== See also ==
- Azerbaijani Legion
- Free Arabian Legion
- Ostlegionen
- Israfil Israfilov

== Bibliography ==
- Klietmann, Dr. K.G. (1965). Die Waffen-SS. Eine Dokumentation (in German). Osnabrück: Verlag der Freiwillige.
- Mazower, Mark (2008). Hitler's Empire.
- Munoz, Antonio J. (1991). Forgotten Legions: Obscure Combat Formations of the Waffen-SS. Axis-Europa Books.
- Neulen, Hans Werner (1985). An deutscher Seite – Internationale Freiwillige von Wehrmacht und Waffen-SS [On the German side - international volunteers of the Wehrmacht and Waffen-SS] (in German). Universitas Verlag München.
- Pfeiffer, Roland (2007a). "Der Osttürkische Waffen-Verband der SS". Archived from the original on 20 March 2008.
- Pfeiffer, Roland (2007b). "Der Kaukasische Waffen-Verband der SS". Archived from the original on 20 March 2008.
- Romanko, Oleg (2004). Мусульманские легионы Второй мировой войны [Muslim legions of the Second World War] (in Russian). АСТ. ISBN 9785957805007.
- Tessin, Georg (1980). Verbände und Truppen der deutschen Wehrmacht und Waffen-SS im Zweiten Weltkrieg 1939-1945. Vol. 14. Osnabrück.
- Mehner, Kurt (1995). Waffen-SS und Ordnungspolizei 1939–1945, Führung und Truppe. Norderstedt: Militair-Verlag Klaus D.Patzwall.
- Akber, Ismayil. Die Azerbaydzhanische Legionare Im kampf.
