= Free Arabian Legion =

Nazi German military unit in World War II

- Free Arabian Legion Insignia
- Active: 1941–1945
- Allegiance: Nazi Germany
- Branch: Wehrmacht
- March: The Bayonet Waved
- Engagements: World War II: Tunisia Campaign; Partisan War in Greece; Partisan War in Yugoslavia

The Free Arabian Legion (German: Legion Freies Arabien; Arabic: جيش بلاد العرب الحرة, romanized: Jaysh bilād al-ʿarab al-ḥurraẗ) was the collective name of several Nazi German units formed from Arab and African volunteers, many of whom were former Allied colonial troops taken as prisoners of war by the Nazis. Additional volunteers were drawn from the Middle East, notably Iraq, and North Africa during World War II.

== Operational history ==
=== Origins ===
In April 1941, a group of senior Iraqi officials, including the politician Rashid Ali al-Gaylani and several army officers who were part of the Golden Square nationalist group, launched a coup d'état which overthrew the Kingdom of Iraq's pro-British government. The new regime, which was pro-Axis, soon made contact with German and Italian authorities and requested military support. Iraqi-Axis communications were established with the help of the Grand Mufti of Jerusalem Amin al-Husseini, who had been living in Iraq since he had fled imprisonment in Mandatory Palestine shortly before the outbreak of World War II in 1939.

In May 1941, the Anglo-Iraqi War began when British forces invaded Iraq. Adolf Hitler had agreed to send Luftwaffe squadrons to support Iraq as well as Special Staff F, a special mission headed by Hellmuth Felmy that was intended to also provide military support to the new Iraqi regime. However, by the end of May the British had defeat the forces of the new regime, with al-Gaylani and al-Husseini fleeing to Iran and then onwards to Germany via Italy. Following the Iraqi defeat, several pro-Axis Arabs were sent to Europe through French Syria, ending up in Sounion, Greece.

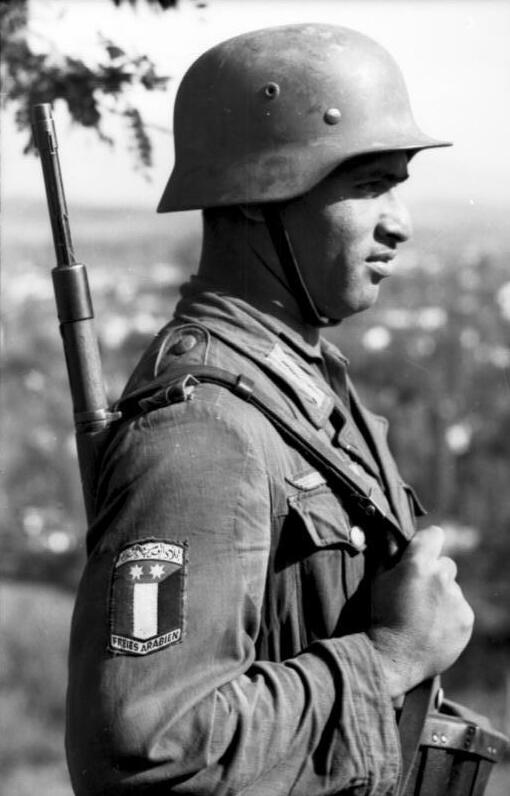
A soldier from the Free Arabian Legion in German-occupied Greece in September 1943.

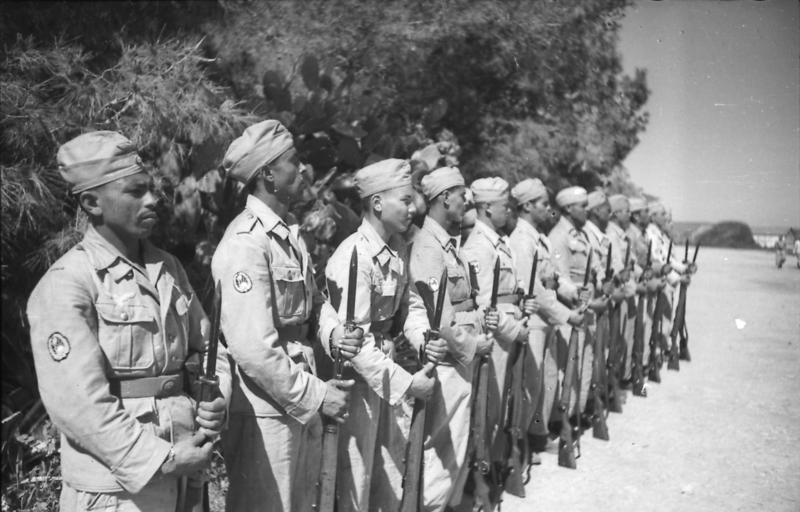
Training of Sonderverband 287

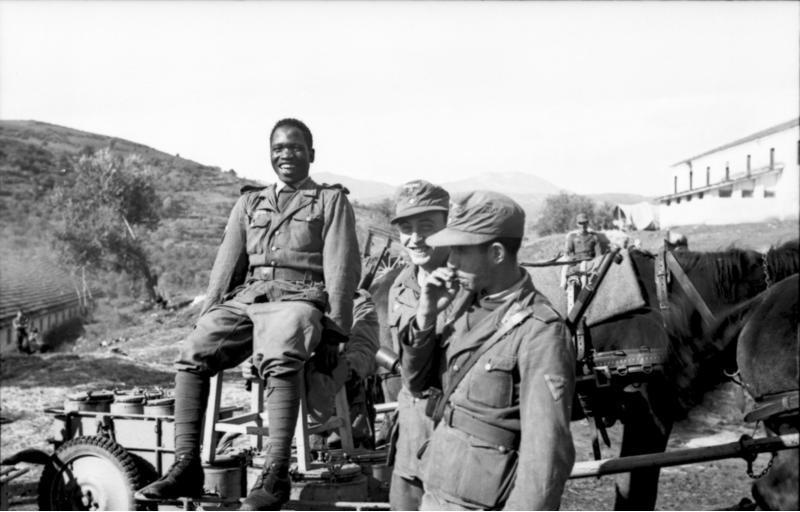
A black soldier of the Free Arabian Legion in Greece

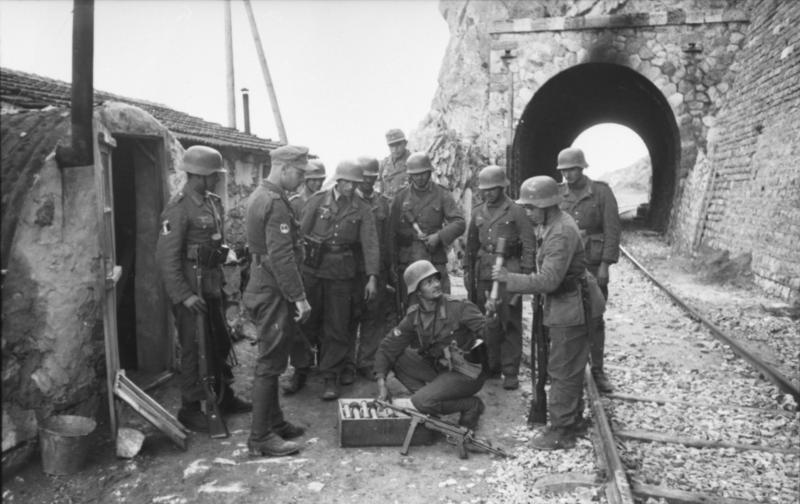
Soldiers of the Free Arabian Legion distributing hand grenades in Greece. The German NCO is wearing the original Sonderverband 287 arm-patch.

=== Units ===
Felmy had by June been given command of Army Group Southern Greece and began raising Arab units for German service using Special Staff F, which had now been expanded and was ordered to "be the central field office for all issues of the Arab world which affect the Wehrmacht." Consequently, the two units Sonderverband 287 was created. Initially, the Germans and Italians decided that the actual Free Arabian Legion would only be an Italian unit raised in Italy, with the Germans handing over hundreds of Allied Arab prisoners of war, but in May 1942 Arab collaborators requested an Arab unit be raised for German service too. The term Free Arabian Legion became not just the name of any specific unit, but an all-encompassing name for all Arab units in the German Army.

==== Sonderverband 287 ====
Sonderverband 287 was formed on 4 August 1942 with significant help from al-Husseini and al-Gaylani. The unit consisted mostly of Iraqi and non-Iraqi Arab Muslims, bolstered by former prisoners of war and other volunteers. The number of Arabs in the unit was low, 24 Iraqis, 112 Syrians and Palestinians, and 127 Arabs from French North Africa. When the 3rd battalion was sent to the Caucasus, Husseini objected, but was ignored and further involvement by him in the unit was objected by the Abwehr. Despite its name, German Foreign Office plans for post-war Arab states omitted the word "independence" for most of them and Germany and Italy were planned to retain privileges and prerogatives in Arab states similar to those held by Britain and France.

The 3rd battalion of Sonderverband 287 was taken from the unit and sent as the Deutsche-Arabische Lehr-Abteilung to the Caucasus in September 1942. It was to be part of the Axis offensive into the region and the German plan to seat the Iraqi government-in-exile there. It was then to use the region as a springboard for conquering Iraq. The plan never came to be and the unit never saw action following heavy German setbacks in late 1942. The unit was sent to the battle in Tunisia via Italy in January 1943. There, the Deutsche-Arabische Lehr-Abteilung was placed on the southern flank of the Axis army and was used to recruit more local Arabs who formed a second battalion of auxiliaries, which were used for guard duty and as construction troops.

At the end of the Tunisian campaign in May 1943, US intelligence and interrogations showed the Sonderverband 287 as containing three battalions: 1st battalion consisting of a tank battalion, 2nd Battalion consisting of French Legionnaires, and 3rd Battalion (in Tunisia) consisting of Arab volunteers. The 3rd battalion had three rifle companies in which only the NCO's were German, and a "heavy" company which had German personnel only. The unit was in the process of remodeling and changes were being made by moving the Arabs into construction units and retaining only a few for carrying weapons, ammunition, etc.

The remaining soldiers of the 3rd battalion, i.e. the Deutsche-Arabische Lehr-Abteilung, who had not been sent to North Africa, were used, together with Arabs from French North Africa, to form the German-Arab Battalion 845 in the summer of 1943. It served in the Peloponnese region of Greece attached to the 41st Fortress Division from November 1943. It participated in the Greek partisan war, particularly against ELAS. In October 1944, it was withdrawn from Greece to Yugoslavia, and in early 1945 was strengthened with the addition of Arabs from a unit of Arab volunteers that was disbanded before it was fully formed. It ended the war near Zagreb attached to the 104th Jäger Division.

The 1st and 2nd battalions of the Free Arabian Legion which had not been part of the Deutsche-Arabische Lehr-Abteilung were used to replace losses and rebuild Grenadier Regiment 92 together with a light battery and light pioneer company on 2 May 1943, which was then renamed Grenadier Regiment 92 (MOT) on 5 June 1944. The regiment moved to Yugoslavia to fight against Josip Broz Tito's National Liberation Army and was part of Army Group F. The regiment suffered heavy losses in the fighting near Belgrade in October 1944, and what remained of it became part of the 2nd Panzer Army, where it was rebuilt into Panzergrenadier Brigade 92 in January 1945. The whole army capitulated in disarray in Austria in May 1945.

==== Sonderverband 288 ====
Sonderverband 288 consisted of Germans organized from companies of Brandenburgers but also contained a cadre of Arab-translators from the Free Arabian Legion and a mobile printing company that could produce Arabic-language leaflets as well as a squad for the operation of oil production facilities. By January 1942, the whole unit was transferred to Italian Libya to fight against Allied forces in the North Africa campaign. The unit was planned to eventually be used in an Axis invasion of the Middle East via Egypt, but this never came to be. After several months of fighting, the unit was renamed Panzer-Grenadier-Regiment Afrika, and was eventually captured by American forces following the capitulation of all Axis forces in North Africa in May 1943.

== See also ==
- Azerbaijani Legion
- Free Indian Legion
- Relations between Nazi Germany and the Arab world
- Waffen-SS foreign volunteers and conscripts and related articles, especially under
  - Amin al-Husseini#Recruitment
  - 13th Waffen Mountain Division of the SS Handschar (1st Croatian)
  - 23rd Waffen Mountain Division of the SS Kama (2nd Croatian)
