= National Committee of Azerbaijan =

National Committee of Azerbaijan (Azerbaijani: Azərbaycan Milli Komitəsi, German: Nationales Komitee von Aserbaidschan) was an organization created in Berlin by Azerbaijani political immigrants. Established in late 1941, the committee's main goal was to make Nazi Germany recognize an independent Azerbaijan, and stop the German annexation of the Caucasus as a whole. In that period, German forces had a great success on Operation Barbarossa against the Soviet Union, thus the state officials were convinced that the Wehrmacht could win the war without the need of additional local assistance. Not being able to come to any substiantal agreement with the Nazi German government, the committee was disbanded in August 1943.

== History ==
=== Creation ===
The political committee was founded in 1941, in Berlin. Ministry of Foreign Affairs of Germany invited Mustafa Vakilov, Mir Yagub Mehdiyev, Khosrov bey Sultanov and Hilal Münşi to Berlin, who at that time, resided in Bucharest. The committee only had four members. Its composition was submitted to the German Foreign Ministry for approval. Along with this document, Mammad Amin Rasulzadeh's broad statement of proposals, which included the immediate recognition of Azerbaijan's independence by the Nazi Germany and the creation of a united Azerbaijani army, was also submitted to the ministry.

=== Activity ===
The Committee considered possible cooperation with the Nazi German leadership only on the Caucasus issue. It was proposed that Nazi forces would not enter the Caucasus after they overthrow the Communist regime, and the region's fate would be decided by the locals themselves. However, the Nazi German government did not accept these proposals. The main reason why Rasulzadeh's proposals were not accepted by the Hitler's leadership was because of German misconception about the future of Operation Barbarossa. The Nazi officials were convinced that they would win without additional assistance. As a result, there was a disagreement with the Nazi government, and the committee's cooperation with the Third Reich did not take place. The Committee was disbanded in August 1943.

== See also ==
- Azerbaijan Democratic Republic
- Aserbaidschanische Legion
- Ukrainian National Committee
