= Azerbaijani Legion =

- Aserbaidschanische Legion
- Late 1943 pattern of the patch worn by the Azerbaijani Legion
- Active: 2 August 1942 – 8 May 1945
- Allegiance: Nazi Germany
- Branch: Wehrmacht
- Size: up to 40,000 troops
- Engagements: World War II

Commanders
- Notable commanders: Abdurrahman Fatalibeyli

The Azerbaijani Legion (German: Aserbaidschanische Legion, Azerbaijani: Azərbaycan legionu) was one of the foreign units of the Wehrmacht. It was formed in December 1941 on the Eastern Front as the Kaukasische-Mohammedanische Legion (Muslim Caucasus Legion) and was re-designated 1942 into two separate legions, the North Caucasian legion and the Azerbaijani legion. It was made up mainly of former Azerbaijani prisoner of war volunteers but also volunteers from other peoples in the area. It was part of the Ostlegionen. It was used to form the 162nd (Turkistan) Infanterie-Division of the Wehrmacht in 1943. Similar to other Ostlegionen, it was organised to replenish the dwindling German manpower on the Eastern Front and to "save the German blood at the front."

The Azerbaijani Legion participated in the systematic killing of between 40,000 and 50,000 Polish civilians in Warsaw during the Wola massacre.

== Origins ==
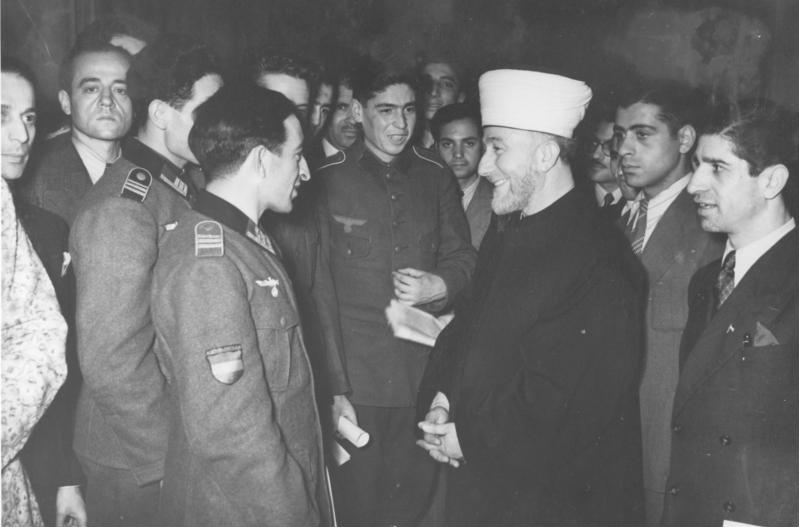
Mufti of Jerusalem, Muhammad Amin Al-Husseini, on the day of his meeting with Azerbaijani legionnaires

The sweeping initial victories of Operation Barbarossa produced hundreds of thousands of Soviet prisoners of war, many of whom were not Russian. All of them were hungry; many were starving. In a mere eight months of 1941-1942, the invading German armies killed an estimated 2.8 million Soviet POWs through starvation, exposure, and summary execution. Conditions in the prison camps were atrocious.

There were no barracks or permanent housing. The camps were simply open areas fenced off with barbed wire. The prisoners had to lie in the sun, then in mud, and in the fall—with temperatures as low as minus 30 degrees Celsius—faced the possibility of freezing to death.

The foreign Waffen beginnings were shrouded in great secrecy for fear of Hitler's disapproval, who was categorically opposed to any form of participation of Soviet citizens in the war against Russia. But the German army's needs on the Eastern Front induced German commanders to accept the services of volunteers to fight the Soviet regime even against the clear orders of the German High Command.

Tens of thousands of them were Muslims, where most of them came from the Soviet Union. In December 1941 a top-secret memorandum ordered that the OKW was to create two Muslim units: the Turkestan Legion, consisting of Central Asian Muslim volunteers; such as Turkomans, Uzbeks, Kazakhs, Kyrgyz, Karakalpaks, and Tajiks, and the Kaukasisch-Mohammedanische Legion from Caucasian Muslims volunteers; such as Azerbaijanis, Dagestanis, Ingush, and Lezgins.

The most numerous ethnicity among the Muslims that served the Germans were the Turkestanis. The first Turkestani volunteers were integrated as a single battalion of the 444th Security Division in November 1941 and became an auxiliary force to help the Germans fight the Soviet partisans. Major Andreas Meyer-Mader was appointed as commander of the 444th Battalion. Meyer-Mader, an Austrian, had served on the staff of Chiang Kai-shek's National Revolutionary Army before World War II.

According to Argumenty i Fakty newspaper, 40,000 Azerbaijanis fought for Nazi Germany, while 700,000 Azerbaijanis were conscripted into Soviet armies.

== 450th Turkistanisches Battalion ==
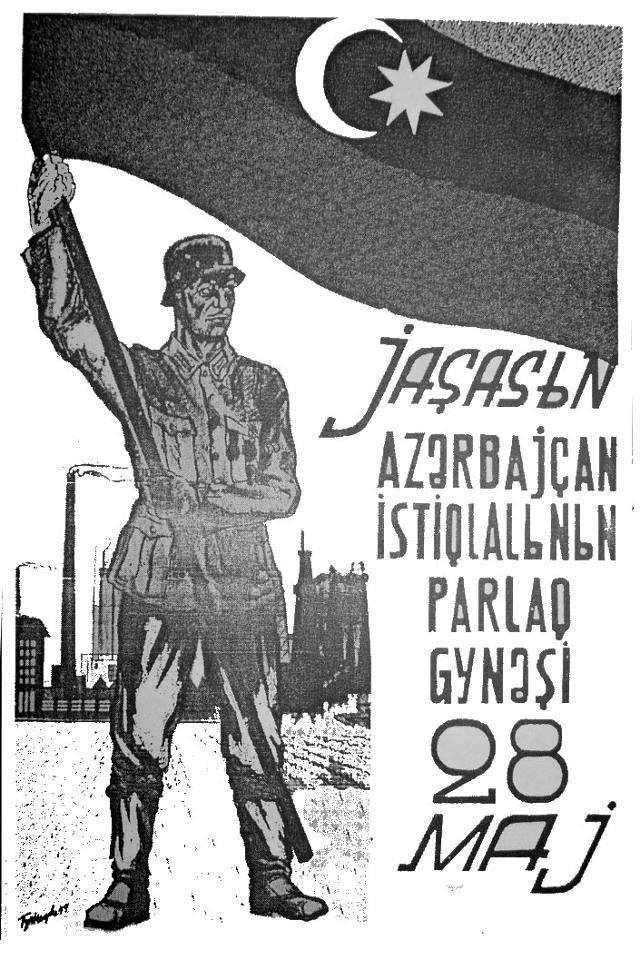
One of the posters of the Azerbaijan Legion during World War II

The 450th Battalion was raised at Legionowo, then in General Government, and spent most of the summer patrolling the communications and rail networks between Kharkiv and Stalingrad. However, discipline became so bad that Meyer-Mader was removed from command of the 450th Battalion in 1943.

In November 1943, Meyer-Mader met Heinrich Himmler to offer his services to help raise and command a Turkic SS unit. Himmler approved the broad plan and then transferred him into the ranks of the Waffen SS and promoted him to the rank of SS-Obersturmbannührer (Lieutenant Colonel). On 14 December, a meeting was held in Berlin in the presence of the Grand Mufti of Jerusalem, Mohammad Amin al-Husayni. The Grand Mufti approved the plan to raise a Turkic-Muslim SS division and to give his "spiritual leadership" to influence the Muslim volunteers.

== Ostmuselmanisches SS-Regiment ==
Between November 1943 and January 1944, there was a series of meetings between Meyer-Mader and Muslim volunteers. As a result of these meetings, on 4 January 1944, it was decided to form the Ostmuselmanisches SS-Regiment. At the same meeting, it was decided to disband the following Wehrmacht battalions who would serve as a basis for a new platform: 450th, 480th, 782nd, 786th, 790th, 791st, and I/94th Turkistanische battalions, Aserbaidschanische 818th and Volga Tatar 831st. Many of the volunteers deserted at this time, and the 818th defected to Polish and Ukrainian resistance movements in 1943.

== Wola massacre ==
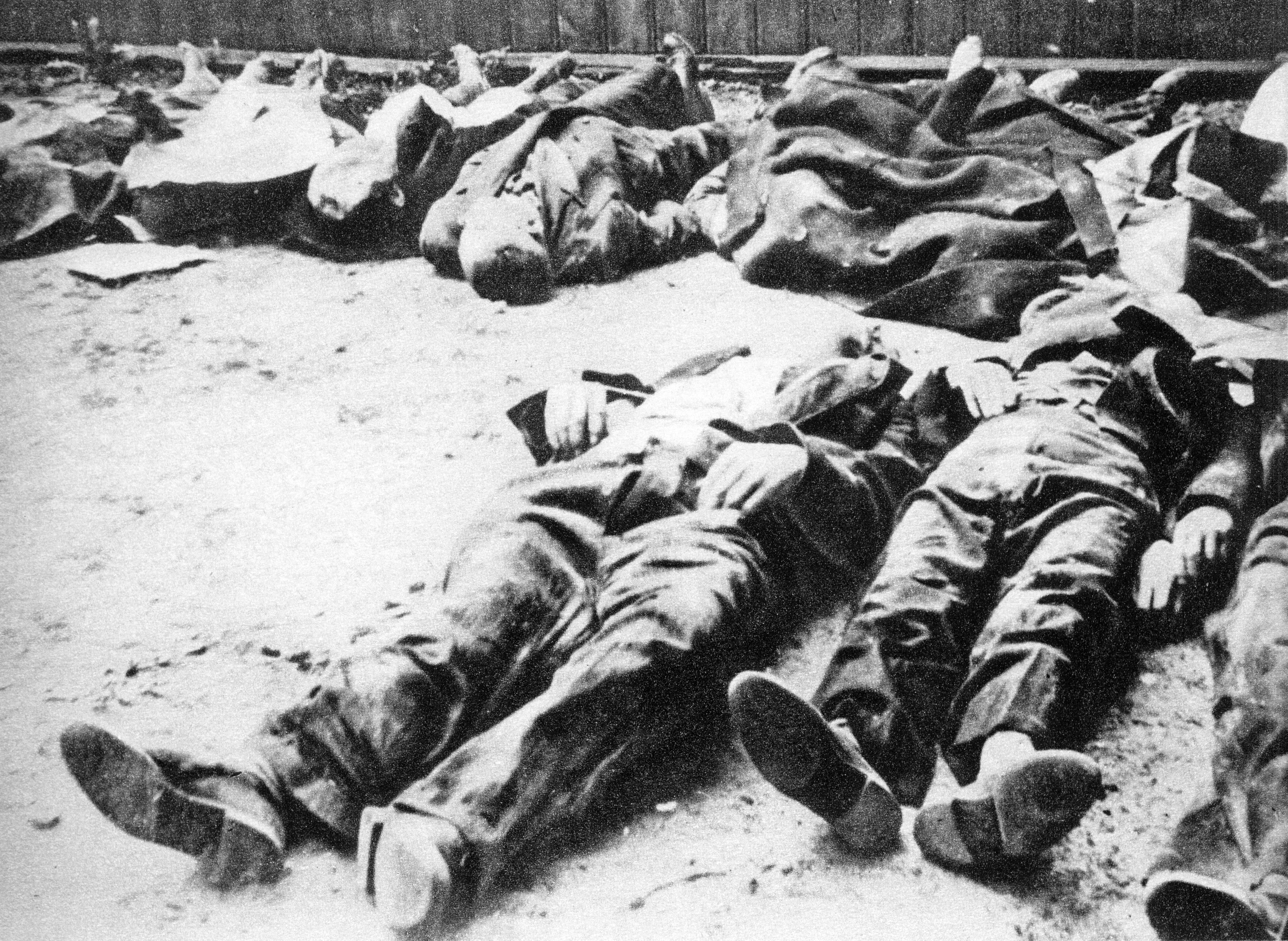
Polish civilians murdered during the Wola massacre in Warsaw, August 1944

Azerbaijani soldiers from the legion (111th regiment) under the SS-Sonderregiment Dirlewanger, an infamous Waffen SS penal unit led by SS-Oberführer Oskar Dirlewanger, participated in the systematic killing of between 40,000 and 50,000 Polish civilians in Warsaw during the Wola massacre. Two hours before midnight on 5 August, the Azerbaijani soldiers and the Bergmann Battalion attacked St Lazarus hospital, executed hundreds of patients, doctors, and nurses, before burning it down.

British historian Martin Windrow described Dirlewanger's unit, which included the Azerbaijani legion, as a "terrifying rabble" of "cut-throats, [foreign] renegades, sadistic morons, and cashiered rejects from other units".

== Operation Zeppelin ==
Operation Zeppelin was initiated in 1942 by SS-Brigadeführer Walter Schellenberg, who became in the middle of May 1943 the Chief of Section E of Amt IV of the RSHA, the foreign intelligence service of the SS. The SS-Obersturmbannführer (Lieutenant Colonel) Georg Greife was responsible for this operation.

As soon as the German troops had entered the territory of the North Caucasus, members of the different Caucasus National Committees, started to set up the core of a State administration and other organizations for the eventuality that Wehrmacht would force the passage in Transcaucasia. In the summer of 1942, the Reich ministries for Finances, Interior, Foreign Affairs, as well as the RSHA, created a special group, "Sonderstab Kaukasus". The "Sonderstab" (special staff) was under the aegis of "Unternehmen Zeppelin". The members of the "Sonderstab" were to organize units of police forces to maintain order in the territory of the North Caucasus and would constitute the organization apparatus of the state.

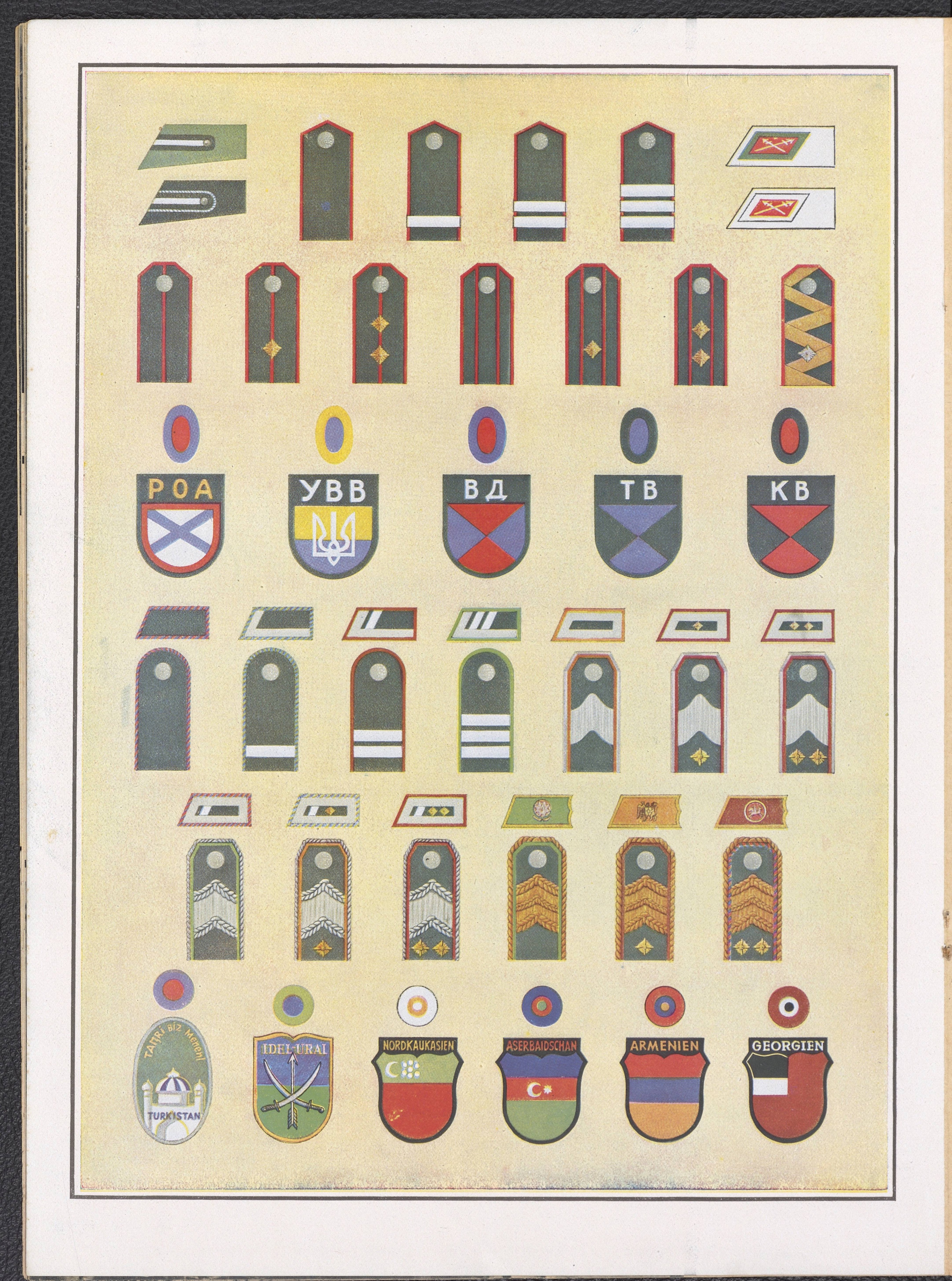
Second set of insignia depicts Turkestan, Caucasian, and Volga Tatar Units patches and rank badges.

Operation Zeppelin had many purposes: creating intelligence groups for the collection and transmission of information from the USSR; advocacy groups for the distribution of social, national, and religious propaganda; rebel groups to organize and conduct a rebellion; and sabotage groups for political sabotage and terror.

From wireless reports of these commandos behind the Russian lines, it is possible to determine what actions were taken. It was envisaged to recruit the future civil servants among the prisoners of war of Caucasian nationality, who were in large numbers in the German camps of the North Caucasus. Abbas Bey Atamalibekov directed the Azerbaijani group. (There is not much information about Atamalibekov. In 1919, he was a member of the Azerbaijani Delegation led by Alimardan Topchubashev, which participated at the Paris Peace Conference in Versailles. He actively participated in forming national legions from the Soviet prisoners of war in 1942, together with Abdurahman Fatalibeyli-Dudanginsky and Fuad Amirjan in Berlin. He represented Azerbaijani SS in the Azerbaijan National Committee from 1943 to 1945 and then fled to Chile.

Operation Zeppelin was "partially successful". Most of the Sonderstab members were captured and executed by KGB agents. In his personal archives, a member of the Ostministerium, Gerhard Von Mende, gives the number of 348 people of Azerbaijani origin who participated in those operations. It is not known if any one of them were SS.

== See also ==
- Azerbaijani SS Volunteer Formations
- National Committee of Azerbaijan
- Free Arabian Legion
- Armenian Legion
- Ostlegionen
- Reichskommissariat Kaukasien
- Abdurrahman Fatalibeyli
- Israfil Israfilov
- Wola massacre

== Bibliography ==
- Hamburg Institute for Social Research (1999). The German Army and Genocide.
