= Turkestan Legion =

German military unit in World War II

- Turkistanische Legion
- Arm badge of the Turkistan Legion
- Founded: May 1942
- Disbanded: 1945
- Allegiance: Nazi Germany
- Branch: Wehrmacht
- Size: 16,000 (1943)
- Part of: German Army
- Engagements: World War II; Italian campaign; Operation Achse; Operation Overlord

Insignia
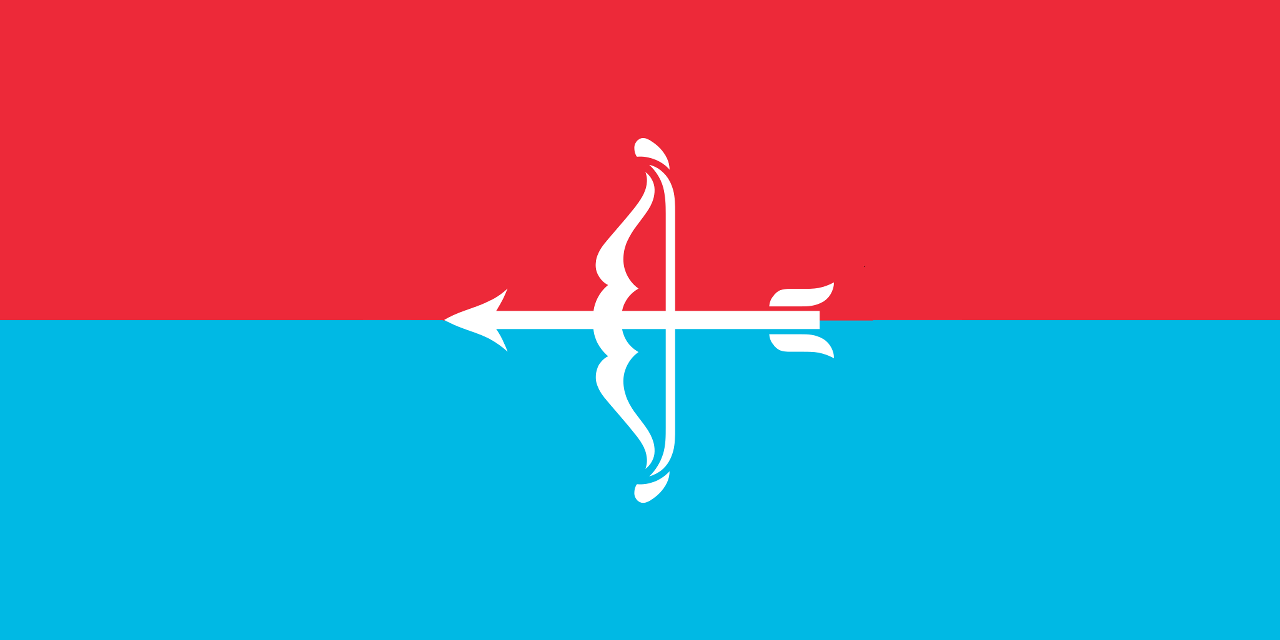
- Flag

The Turkestan Legion (German: Turkistanische Legion) was the name of the military units composed of Turkic peoples who served in the Wehrmacht during World War II. Most of these troops were Red Army prisoners of war who formed a common cause with the Germans (cf. Turkic, Caucasian, and Crimean collaborationism with the Axis powers). Its establishment was assisted by Nuri Killigil, a Turkish theorist of Pan-Turkism.

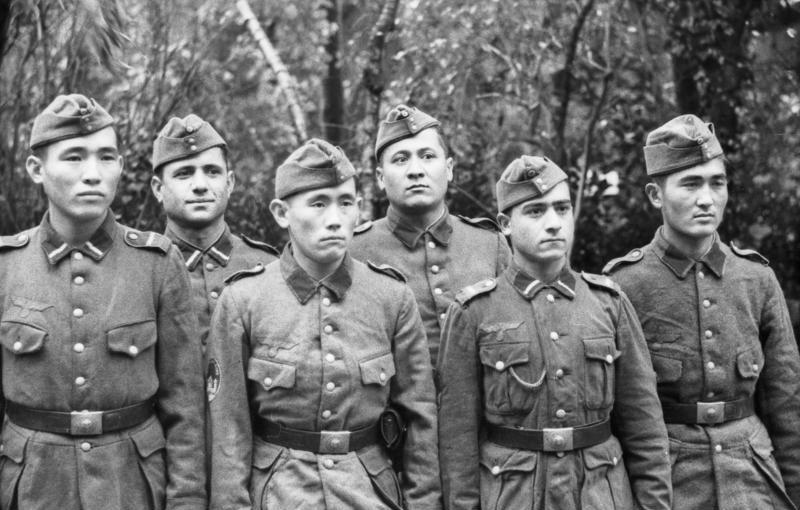
Turkmen volunteers in France.

The first Turkestan Legion was mobilized in May 1942, originally consisting of only one battalion but expanded to 16 battalions and 16,000 soldiers by 1943. Under the Wehrmacht's command, these units were deployed exclusively on the Western Front in France and Italy, isolating them from contact with the Red Army.

The battalions of the Turkestan Legion formed part of the 162nd Infantry Division and saw anti-partisan action in Axis-occupied Yugoslavia (especially modern-day Croatia) and Italy.

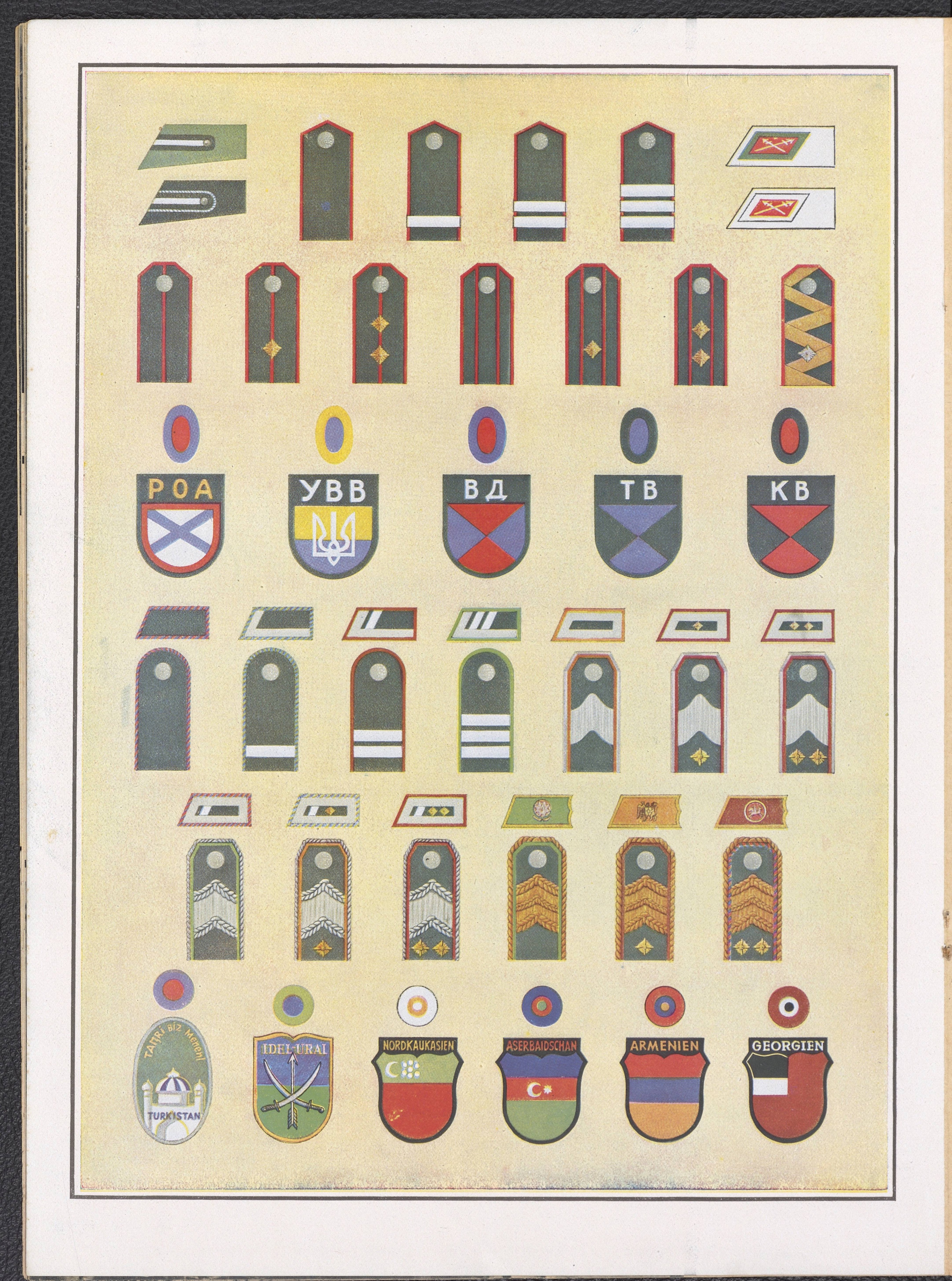
Second set of insignia depicts Turkestan, Caucasian, and Volga Tatar Units patches and rank badges.

A large portion of the Turkestan Legion was captured by Allied forces and repatriated into the Soviet Union after the war's end, where they faced execution or incarceration by the Soviet government for having collaborated with the Nazis. Notable members of the legion include Baymirza Hayit, a Turkologist who after the war settled in West Germany and became an advocate for Pan-Turkist political causes.

== Units ==
The units of the Turkestan Legion were:

- Turkestanisches Infanterie-Bataillon 450
- Turkestanisches Infanterie-Bataillon 452
- Turkestanisches Infanterie-Bataillon 781
- Turkestanisches Infanterie-Bataillon 782
- Turkestanisches Infanterie-Bataillon 783
- Turkestanisches Infanterie-Bataillon 784
- Turkestanisches Infanterie-Bataillon 785
- Turkestanisches Infanterie-Bataillon 786
- Turkestanisches Infanterie-Bataillon 787
- Turkestanisches Infanterie-Bataillon 788
- Turkestanisches Infanterie-Bataillon 789
- Turkestanisches Infanterie-Bataillon 790
- Turkestanisches Infanterie-Bataillon 791
- Turkestanisches Infanterie-Bataillon 792
- Turkestanisches Infanterie-Bataillon 793
- Turkestanisches Infanterie-Bataillon 794
- Turkestanisches Infanterie-Bataillon 811
- Turkestanisches Infanterie-Bataillon 839
- Turkestanisches Infanterie-Bataillon 840
- Turkestanisches Infanterie-Bataillon 841
- Turkestanisches Infanterie-Bataillon 842

== See also ==
- Azerbaijani Legion
- Collaboration with the Axis powers
- Ostlegionen
