= Pawiak =

Prison built in 1835 in Warsaw, Poland

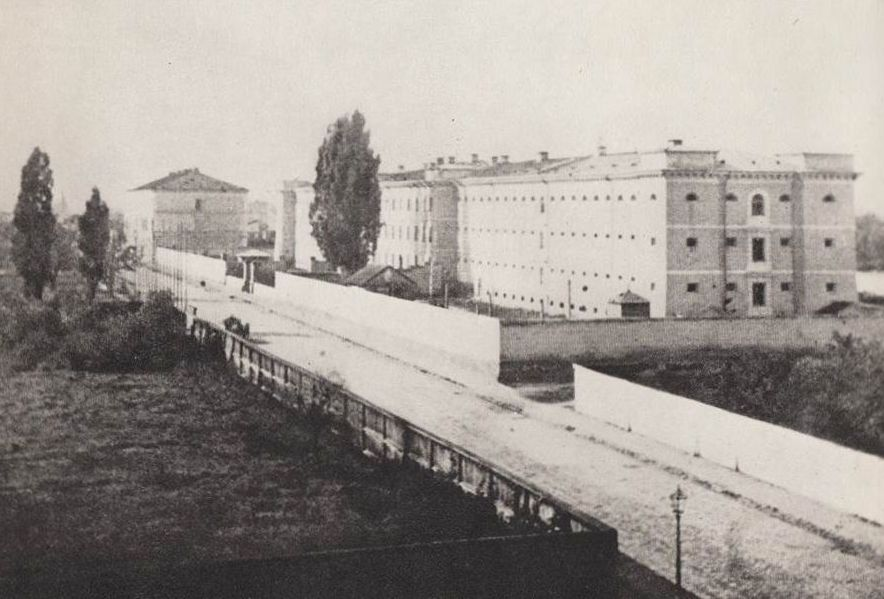
- Photograph of Pawiak Prison in 1864
- Interactive map of Pawiak
- Location: Warsaw, Poland; 52°14′47″N 20°59′26″E
- Opened: 1835
- Closed: 1944

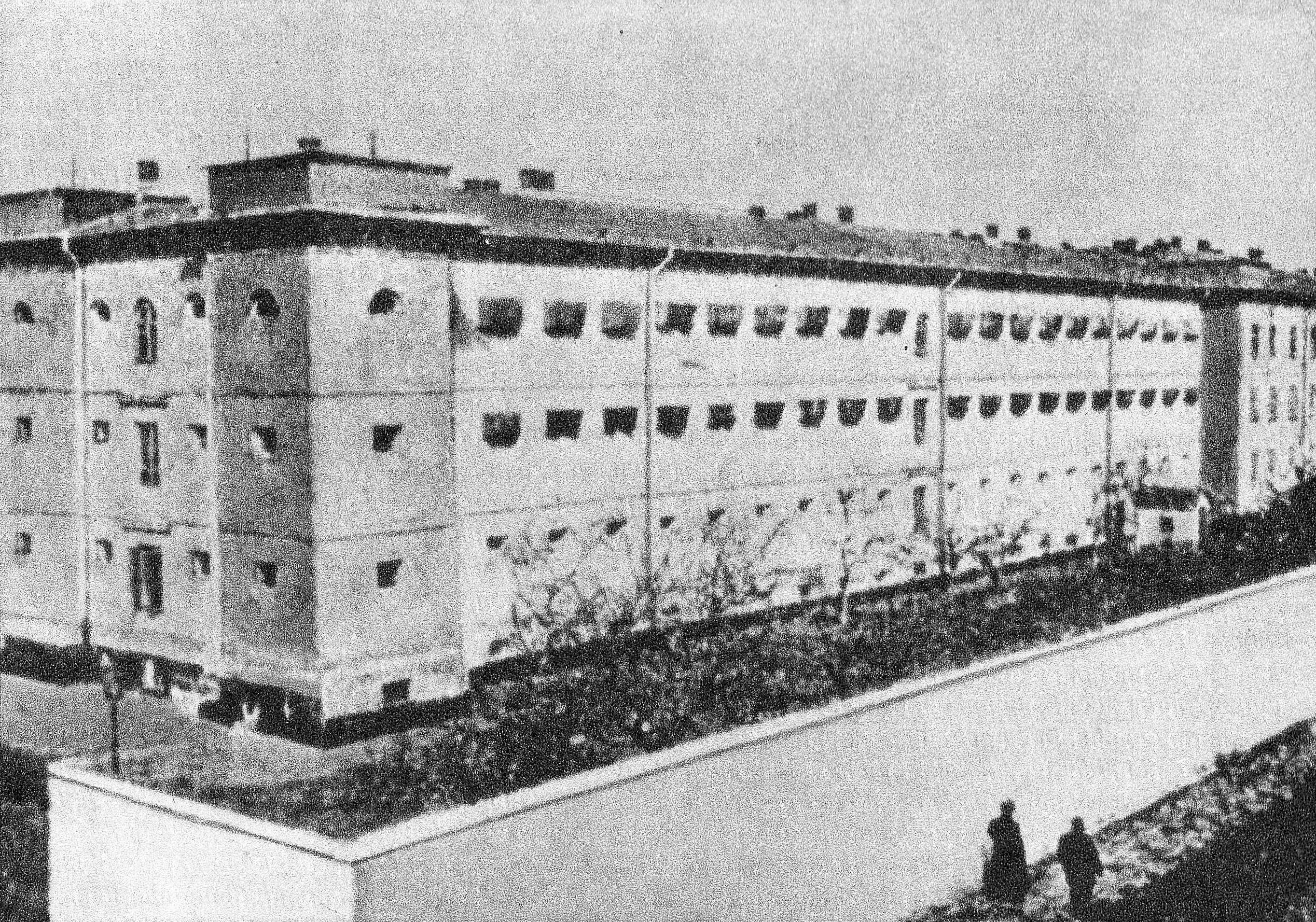
Pawiak, beginning of 20th century

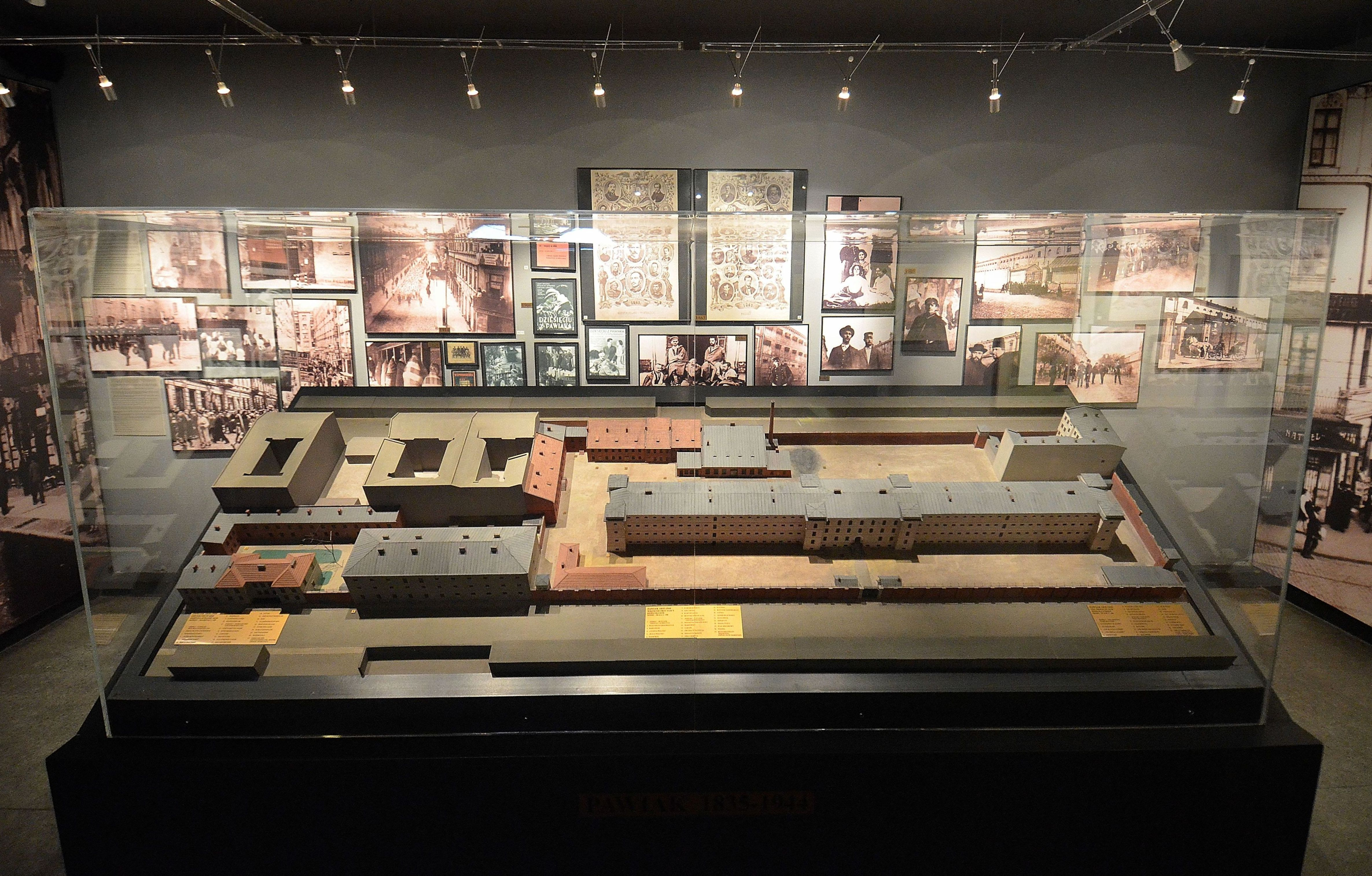
Model of the Pawiak prison in the Pawiak Museum in Warsaw

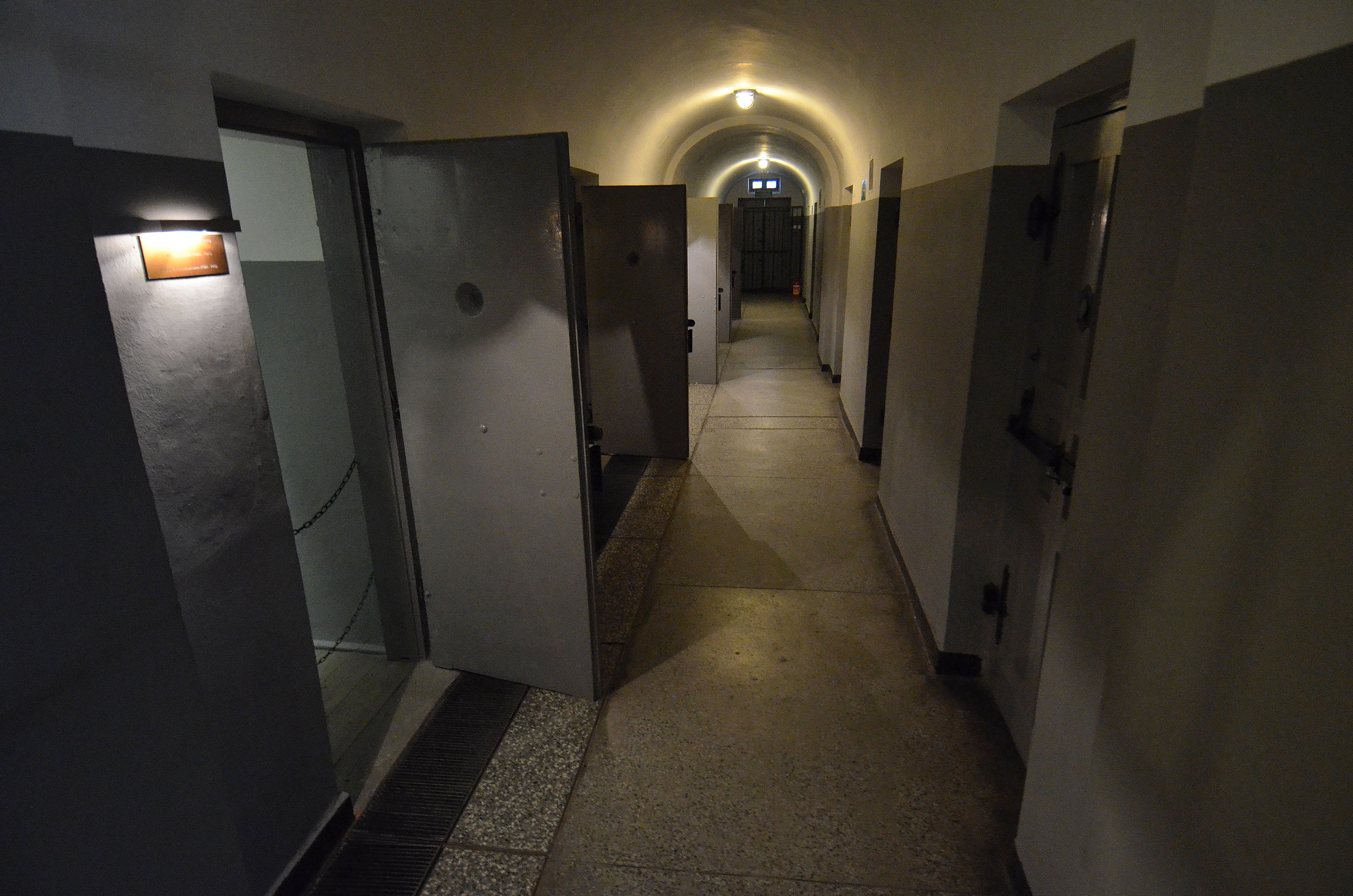
Preserved prison corridor with cells

Pawiak (Polish pronunciation: [ˈpavjak]) was a prison built in 1835 in Warsaw, Congress Poland.

During the January 1863 Uprising, it served as a transfer camp for Poles sentenced by Imperial Russia to deportation to Siberia.

During the World War II-era German occupation of Poland, it was used by the Germans, and in 1944 it was destroyed in the Warsaw Uprising.

== History ==
Pawiak Prison took its name from that of the street on which it stood, ulica Pawia (Polish for "Peacock Street").

Pawiak Prison was built in 1829–35 to the design of Enrico Marconi and Fryderyk Florian Skarbek, prison reformer, godfather to composer Frédéric Chopin, and ancestor of Krystyna Skarbek, the first woman to serve Britain as a special agent in the Second World War. During the 19th century, it was under tsarist control as Warsaw was part of the Russian Empire. During that time, it was the main prison of central Poland, where political prisoners and criminals alike were incarcerated.

During the January 1863 Uprising, the prison served as a transfer camp for Poles sentenced by Imperial Russia to deportation to Siberia.

After Poland regained independence in 1918, the Pawiak Prison became Warsaw's main prison for criminals. Its ward for females was called Serbia, but the residents of Warsaw usually referred to the entire prison complex as Pawiak, i.e. both Pawiak itself (the men's wing) and Serbia (the women's wing).

Following the 1939 German invasion of Poland, the Pawiak Prison became a German Gestapo prison. Approximately 100,000 people were imprisoned during the prison's operation, some 37,000 died on premises (executed, under torture, or during detention), and 60,000 were transferred to Nazi concentration camps. Large numbers of Jews passed through Pawiak after the closure of the Warsaw Ghetto in November 1940 and during the first deportation in July to August 1942. Exact numbers are unknown, as the prison archives were never found.

During the Warsaw Ghetto Uprising, the Pawiak Prison became a German assault base. Pawiak jailers, commanded by Franz Bürkl, volunteered to hunt the Jews.

On 19 July 1944 a Ukrainian Wachmeister (guard) Petrenko and some prisoners attempted a mass jailbreak, supported by an attack from outside, but failed. Petrenko and several others committed suicide. The resistance attack detachment was ambushed and practically annihilated. The next day, in reprisal, the Germans executed over 380 prisoners. As Julien Hirshaut convincingly argues in Jewish Martyrs of Pawiak, it is inconceivable that the prison-escape attempt was a Gestapo-initiated provocation. The Polish underground had approved the plan but backed out without being able to alert those in the prison that the plan was cancelled.

The final transport of prisoners took place 30 July 1944, two days before the 1 August outbreak of the Warsaw Uprising. Two thousand men and the remaining 400 women were sent to Gross-Rosen and Ravensbrück. Subsequently the Polish insurgents captured the area but lost it to German forces. On 21 August 1944 the Germans shot an unknown number of remaining prisoners and burned and blew up the buildings.

After World War II, the buildings were not rebuilt. Half of the gateway and three detention cells survive. Since 1990 a surviving basement has housed a museum which, with the Mausoleum of Struggle and Martyrdom, forms the Museum of Independence.

== Gallery ==
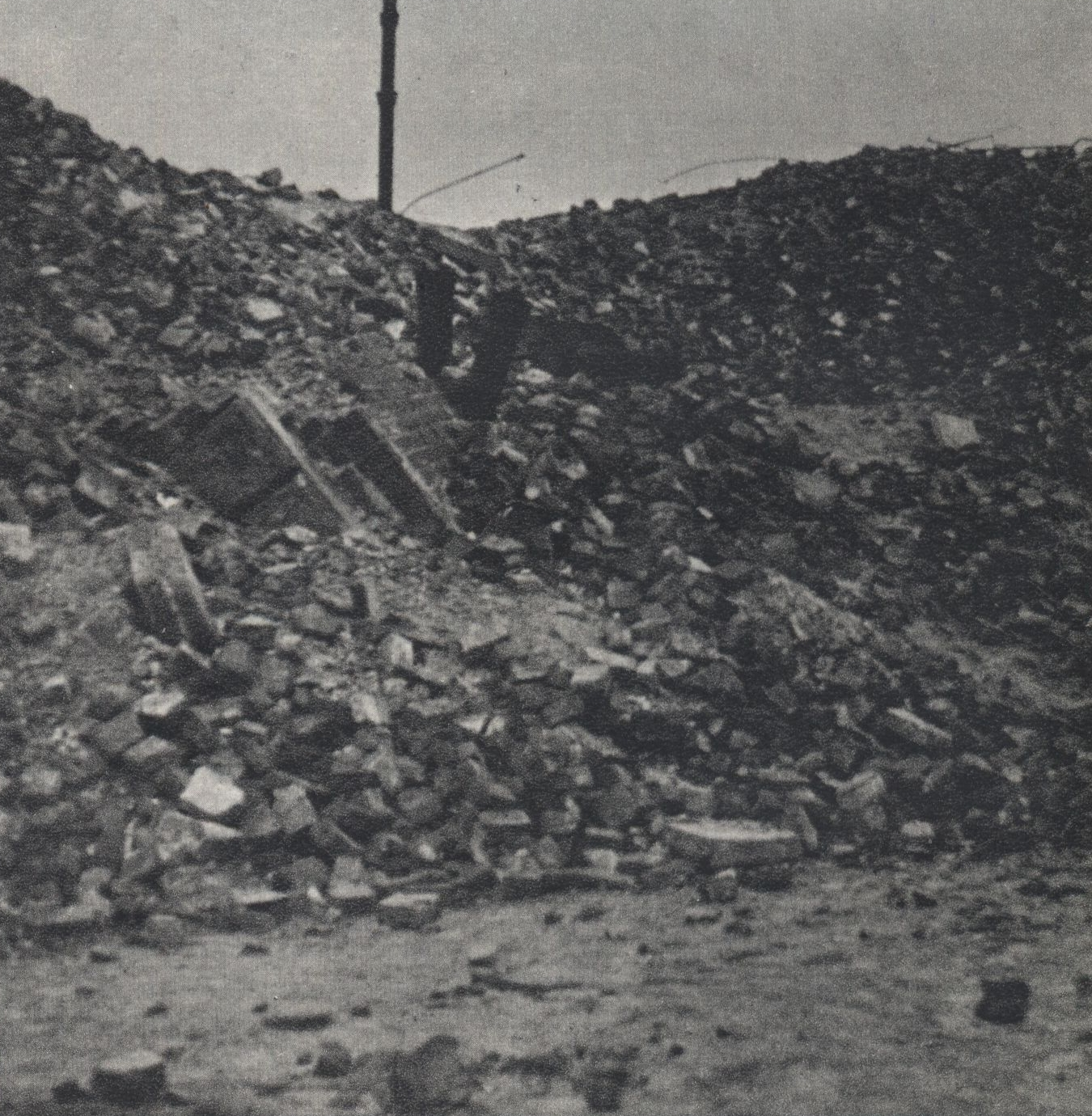
Ruins of 27 Dzielna Street; located near Pawiak Prison; a place of executions of Poles and Jews by the Germans

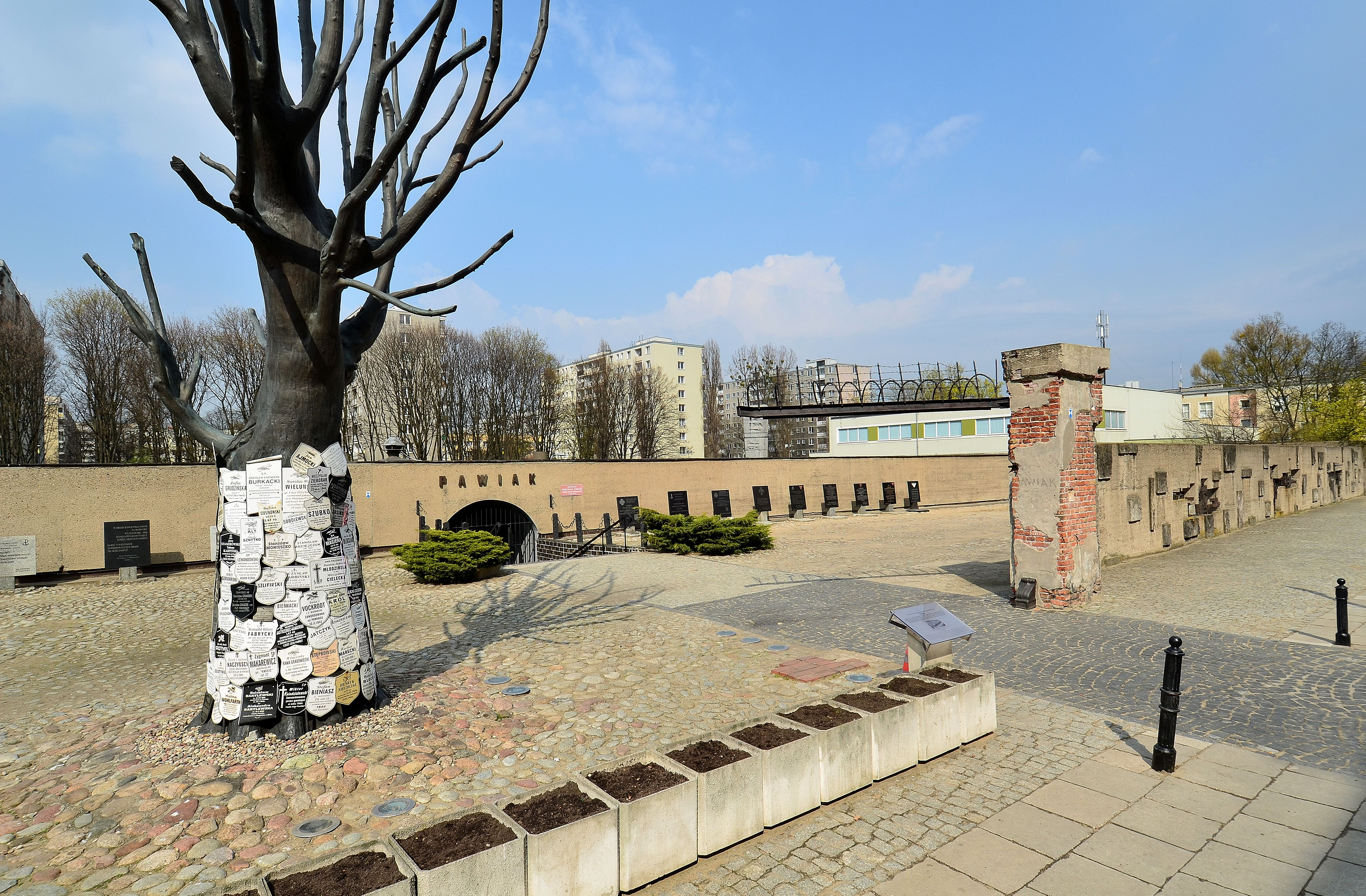
Site of Pawiak prison

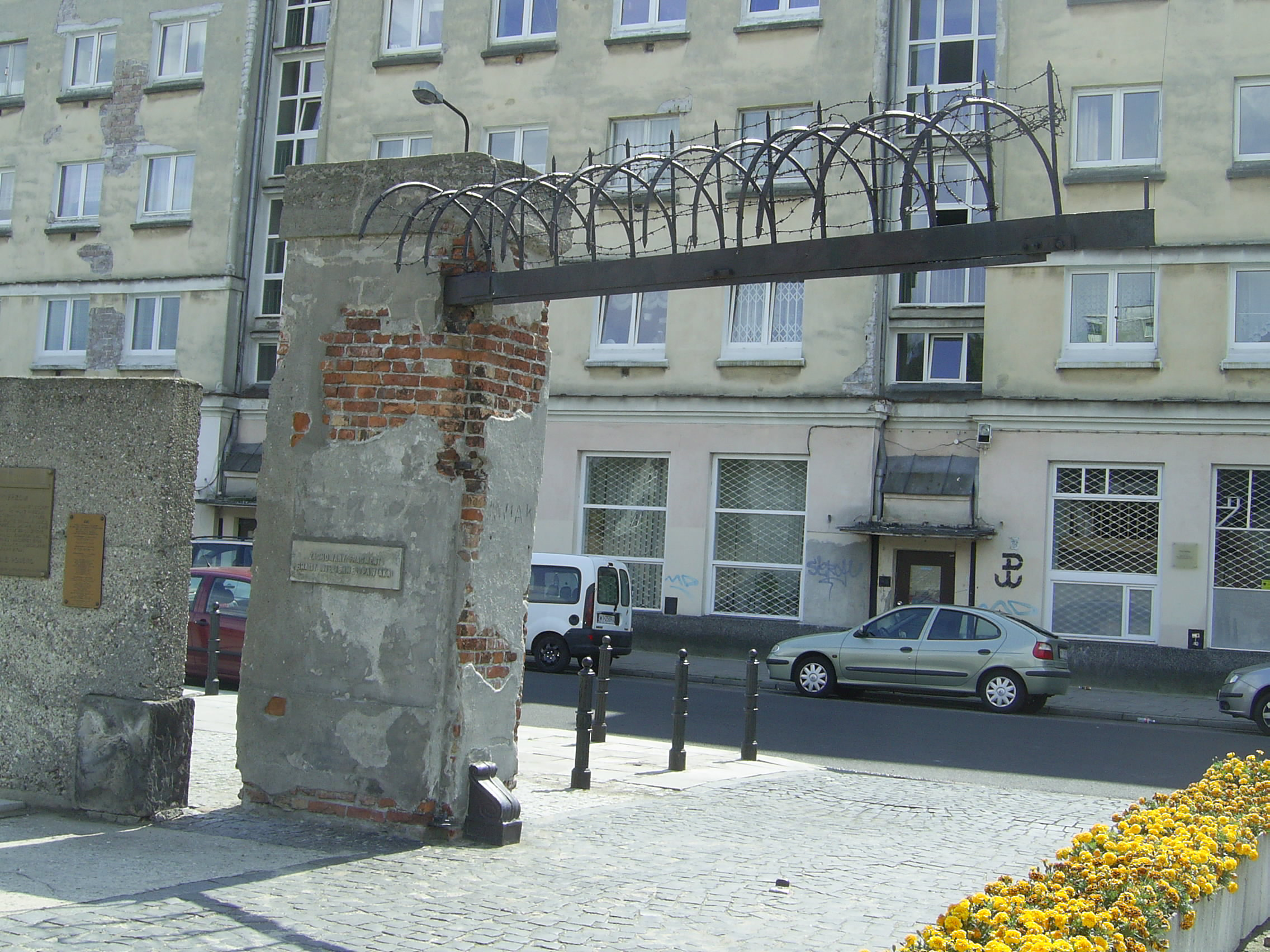
Ruin of Pawiak prison gate

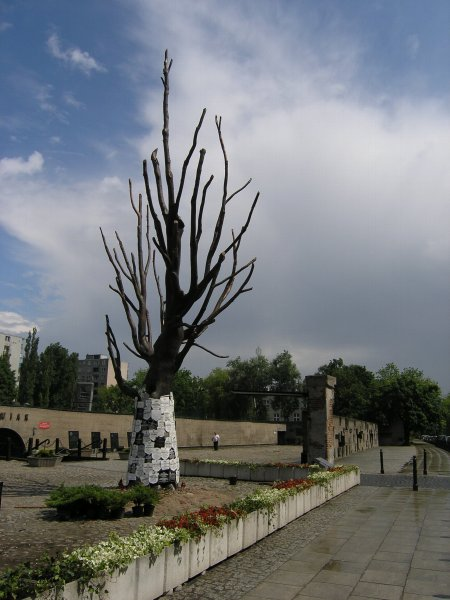
Memorial tree

== See also ==
- Paweł Finder
- Gęsiówka
- Łapanka
- Mokotów Prison
- War crimes in occupied Poland during World War II
- Chronicles of Terror
