= Executions in Warsaw's police district =

Mass executions of residents of Warsaw by the Germans during the Warsaw Uprising

- Location: 52°14′18″N 21°0′54.33″E; Warsaw, Poland under the occupation of the Third Reich
- Date: August 1944
- Attack type: execution by shooting
- Deaths: between 5,000 and 10,000 civilians
- Perpetrator: Third Reich

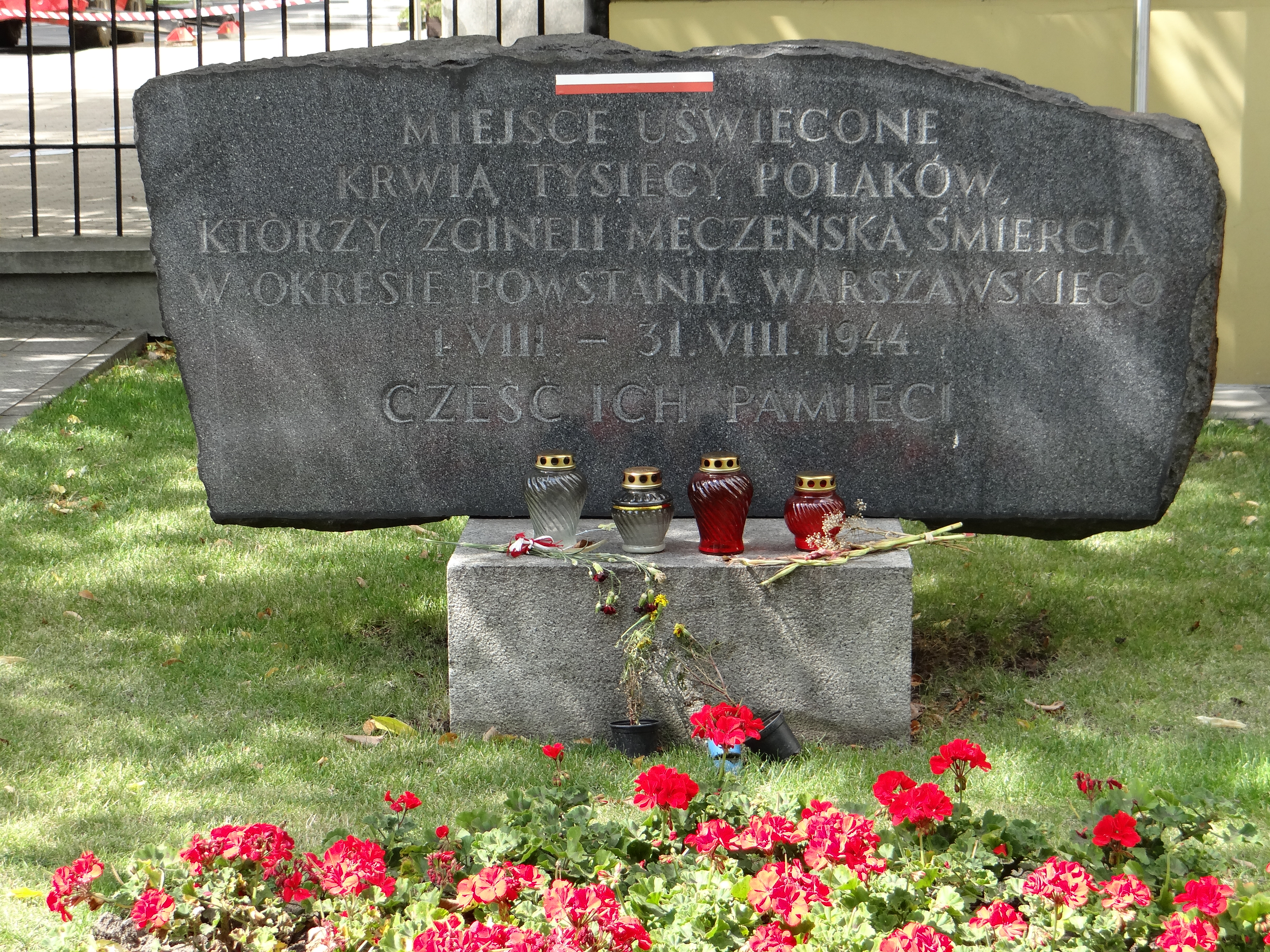
Plaque at 1/3 Ujazdów Avenue commemorating the victims of executions carried out in the ruins of the General Inspector of the Armed Forces

The executions in Warsaw's police district were mass executions of residents from Warsaw's Śródmieście and southern districts, carried out by the Germans during the Warsaw Uprising in the so-called police district in South Downtown.

The collective executions near the headquarters of the Sicherheitspolizei at Jan Chrystian Szuch Avenue occurred primarily in the first days of August 1944. On a smaller scale, they continued until the final days of the uprising. Over two months, SS officers and Ordnungspolizei murdered between 5,000 and 10,000 Warsaw residents in this area, including men, women, and children. The mass and systematic executions of South Downtown residents directly implemented Hitler's order mandating the total extermination of Warsaw's population. These atrocities preceded the Wola massacre.

== Police district at the "W" Hour ==
On 1 August 1944, at 5:00 PM, soldiers of the Home Army attacked German positions across all districts of occupied Warsaw. The target of the attack also included the heavily fortified "police district" in South Downtown, with its key point being the headquarters of Sicherheitspolizei, located in the building of the pre-war Ministry of Religious Denominations and Public Enlightenment at 25 Szuch Avenue. The task of capturing this building was assigned to soldiers from the VII Home Army Group Ruczaj and the 1st Cavalry Squadron of the Home Army Jeleń.

Poorly armed insurgents stood no chance of capturing the building, which was defended by nearly 800 well-armed police officers and Gestapo agents. In the first phase of the attack, the Home Army soldiers, at the cost of heavy losses, managed to capture the officers' club building at 29 Szuch Avenue, part of the ruins of the General Inspector of the Armed Forces, and car workshops on Bagatela Street. The insurgents also managed to shell the Sicherheitspolizei headquarters with a mortar, forcing the commander of the defence of the police district, SS-Oberführer Paul Otto Geibel (SS and police leader for the Warsaw District), to take refuge in a shelter. After two hours of fighting, when the Polish soldiers ran out of ammunition, the Germans launched a counterattack. The company holding the officers' club, led by Lieutenant Kosma of the Ruczaj Battalion, was cut off. In the unequal battle, the company commander was killed, and his unit was destroyed. The remaining Home Army units were pushed back to their starting positions. The Germans massacred the wounded and captured insurgents.

In the evening of 1 August, the Germans entered homes at 5 and 9 Flory Street, which had been abandoned by Home Army soldiers, and dragged out all men above the age of 14, executing them by shooting.

== Executions in the ruins of the General Inspector of the Armed Forces and the Jordan's Garden ==
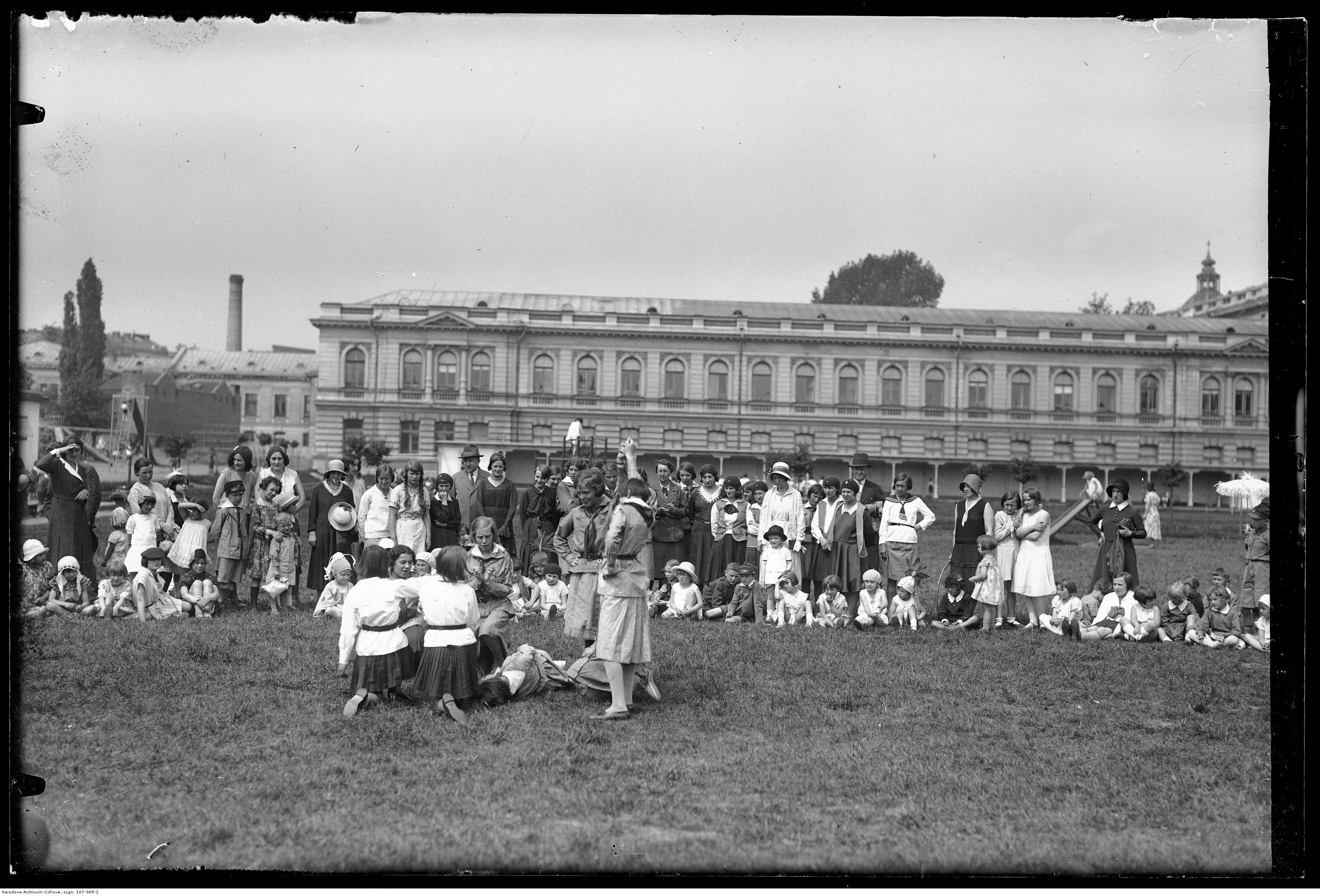
Jordan's Garden at Bagatela Street, pre-war photograph

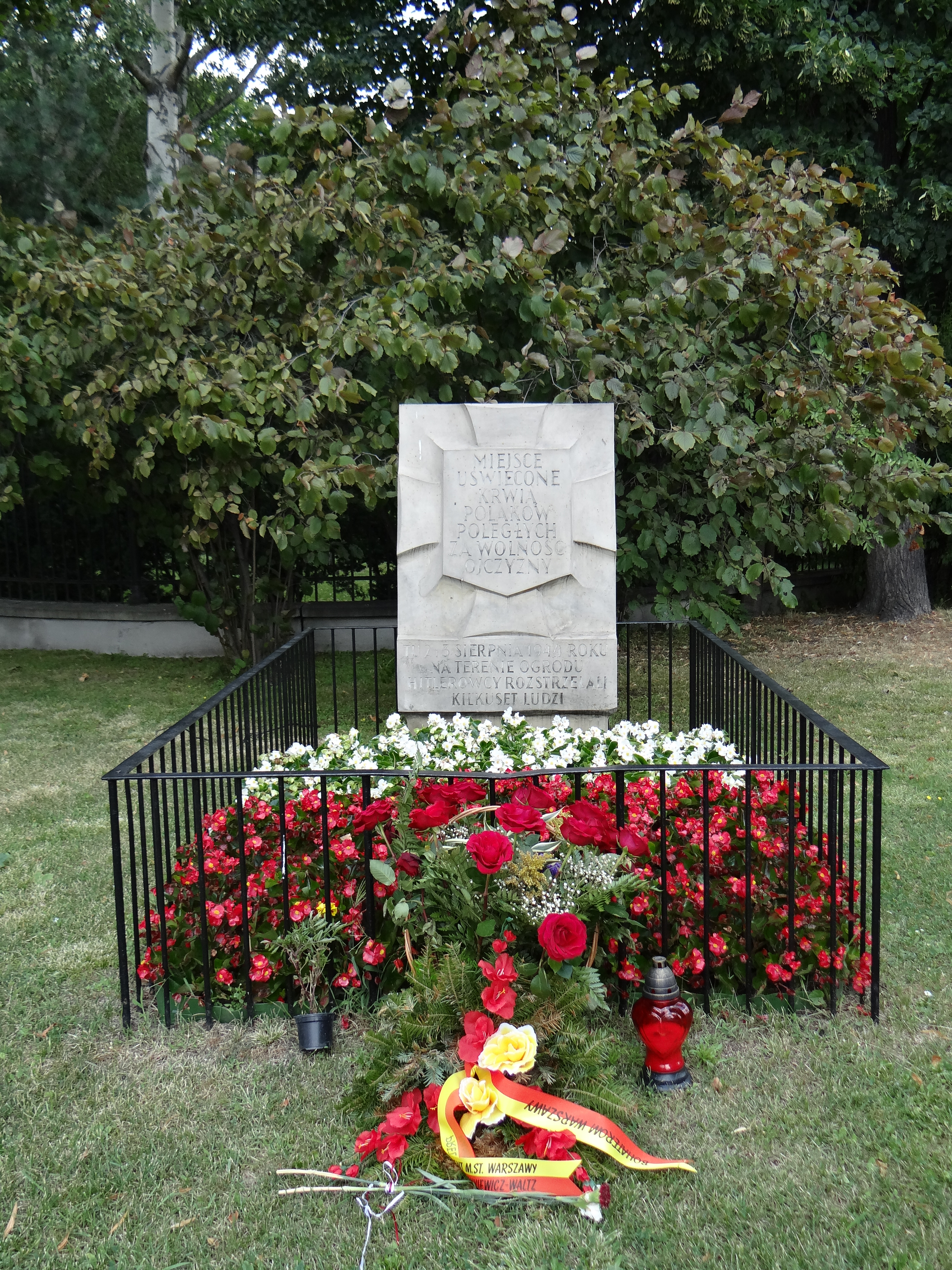
Commemorative plaque for the victims of the executions in the Jordan's Garden, at the intersection of Ujazdów Avenue and Bagatela Street

Shortly after repelling the insurgent attack, the garrison of the police district began pacifying the surrounding blocks inhabited by Polish civilians. The mass murders that followed were directly connected to the orders received by Paul Otto Geibel and other German commanders in Warsaw from Hitler, which commanded the destruction of the city and the extermination of all its inhabitants. After the war, Paul Otto Geibel testified during an interrogation by a Polish judge that, by the evening of 1 August 1944, Reichsführer-SS Heinrich Himmler had telephoned him, saying: "You must destroy tens of thousands". Similarly, SS-Standartenführer Dr. Ludwig Hahn, the commander of Sicherheitsdienst and Sicherheitspolizei in the Warsaw District, testified during his post-war interrogation in Hamburg (1961) that on 2 August 1944, he received a telegram from Himmler, ordering him to crush the uprising "using all the most brutal methods", such as burning all the city's districts and murdering all Poles living in Warsaw. Thus, the mass and organised extermination of Warsaw's population did not begin with the Wola massacre, but with the executions of the residents of South Downtown.

According to one witness, the SS and police units under Geibel and Hahn began the mass murder of the residents of South Downtown as early as the evening of 1 August. In the ruins of the General Inspector of the Armed Forces building at 1 Ujazdów Avenue, nearly 980 people were reportedly murdered at that time. However, it is generally accepted that the mass executions in the police district began on 2 August 1944.

The extermination action usually followed the same scenario. SS and police units, composed of Germans and their Ukrainian collaborators, (Note: A company of about 150 Ukrainians was stationed at 6 Szuch Avenue (Borkiewicz (1969, p. 42)).) systematically expelled Polish civilians from the blocks near the headquarters of the Sicherheitspolizei. The buildings were typically set on fire, sometimes preventing the evacuation of the elderly, sick, or others unable to move on their own. The remaining residents were driven to Szuch Street amidst screams, beatings, and looting. There, the Germans conducted a quick selection. Some of the detained, mostly women and children, were driven into areas occupied by insurgents. Selected men were held as forced labourers, made to work digging trenches, building connections, carrying loads or dismantling barricades. Additionally, Geibel ordered some women to be held as hostages. They were then used as "human shields" in front of German tanks attacking insurgent barricades. Thousands of Poles were also murdered on the spot.

Initially, the Germans carried out mass executions in the area of the Jordan's Garden at Bagatela Street. The victims were usually led to the execution site in groups of 30 to 100 people. In the garden, they were ordered to strip naked and lie down in several rows on the ground – often on the bodies of people who had been killed moments earlier. Then, the lying victims were shot, usually in the back of the head. Sometimes, Polish civilians were also shot against the wall of the General Inspector of the Armed Forces building, the wing of which directly adjoined the Jordan's Garden. The bodies of the murdered were stacked in piles and burned in the garden. Witnesses testified that the piles of bodies sometimes reached halfway up the General Inspector of the Armed Forces building's floor, and the area was constantly filled with the stench of burning corpses. Before their deaths, the victims were completely looted. It was reported that the Germans sometimes knocked out gold teeth from the killed with rifle butts.

However, the Germans quickly realised that the executions in the Jordan's Garden could be easily observed by unwanted witnesses. For this reason, from 4 August, the Germans began mass executions in the ruins of the southern wing of the General Inspector of the Armed Forces building, which had been destroyed in September 1939 and directly adjoined the garden area. Due to war damage, the building was without a roof and internal walls. To prevent the observation of the crimes being committed inside the building, the Germans boarded up most of the ground-floor windows. Only one window on the high ground floor was left, and it was fitted with a board with a crossbar. This window then served as the entrance through which the SS men led the victims to the execution site. In the building's boiler room, the Germans set up a makeshift crematorium.

Both in the Jordan's Garden and in the ruins of the General Inspector of the Armed Forces, the victims were primarily men and boys capable of carrying weapons. However, in the first days of August 1944, women and children were also shot there – among them, employees of the municipal tram system and orphans from an orphanage near the Children's Hospital on Litewska Street – as well as elderly people and the disabled. During this period, the Germans primarily executed Poles living in South Downtown in the police district. The first victims were residents of homes in the area around Ujazdów Avenue, Klonowa Street, Chocimska Street, Bagatela Street, Union of Lublin Square, and Marszałkowska Street.

On the evening of 5 August, SS-Obergruppenführer Erich von dem Bach-Zelewski succeeded in overturning Hitler's order mandating the extermination of all Warsaw residents regardless of age or gender. From that moment, the number of executions in the ruins of the General Inspector of the Armed Forces building significantly decreased. While mass executions had previously taken place almost continuously, they were later limited to no more than one or two groups of dozens of prisoners per day (according to the testimony of witness Szczepan Grudzień). Another witness, Bronisław Polak, testified that between 11 and 20 August, about five to six groups of prisoners were usually brought to the General Inspector of the Armed Forces for execution. Afterward, only individual persons or small groups were occasionally brought in for execution. Cases of women and children being killed also became less frequent.

During this period, victims were usually brought in from Siekierki, Sielce, Upper Mokotów, and Solec. The area around the Gestapo headquarters on Szuch Avenue became a site for "selection" of residents expelled from southern districts of Warsaw. This involved identifying and extracting individuals suspected of participating in the uprising, those of Jewish origin, the elderly, and infirm – anyone unable to work or make it on their own to the Dulag 121 camp in Pruszków. The selection criteria were so arbitrary that virtually anyone who displeased the SS could be taken from the crowd. The selected refugees were executed in the ruins of the General Inspector of the Armed Forces building.

Not much information about these executions has survived. It is known, however, that on 23 August, nearly 100 men from Siekierki were murdered in the ruins of the General Inspector of the Armed Forces building, with another 120 likely killed over the next two days. Witness testimonies also frequently mentioned that at the SS and Luftwaffe barracks in Mokotów (Stauferkaserne on Rakowiecka Street and Flakkaserne on Puławska Street), where thousands of Polish civilians were imprisoned during the uprising, Gestapo officers from Szuch Avenue often selected groups of a dozen or several dozen men from the crowd of prisoners, who were then taken to unknown locations. Around the same time, South Downtown residents reported observing numerous executions of small groups of prisoners in the ruins of the General Inspector of the Armed Forces building. (Note: Geibel, interrogated after the war by a Polish judge, admitted that SS-Obersturmführer Martin Patz, the commander of the prison in the Stauferkaserne barracks, informed him that Hahn's Gestapo officers were taking prisoners under his command – supposedly for work – who never returned. However, Hahn had assured Geibel that no harm had come to these individuals (Datner & Leszczyński (1962, p. 419)).)

Executions of "selected" women and men continued at the General Inspector of the Armed Forces site even after the fall of Czerniaków on 23 September 1944. Witness Szczepan Grudzień testified that a renewed intensification of executions in the General Inspector of the Armed Forces ruins occurred around mid-September 1944, during the fighting in Sielce and Upper Czerniaków (Solec). Later, the number of executions diminished, ceasing entirely by late September or early October.

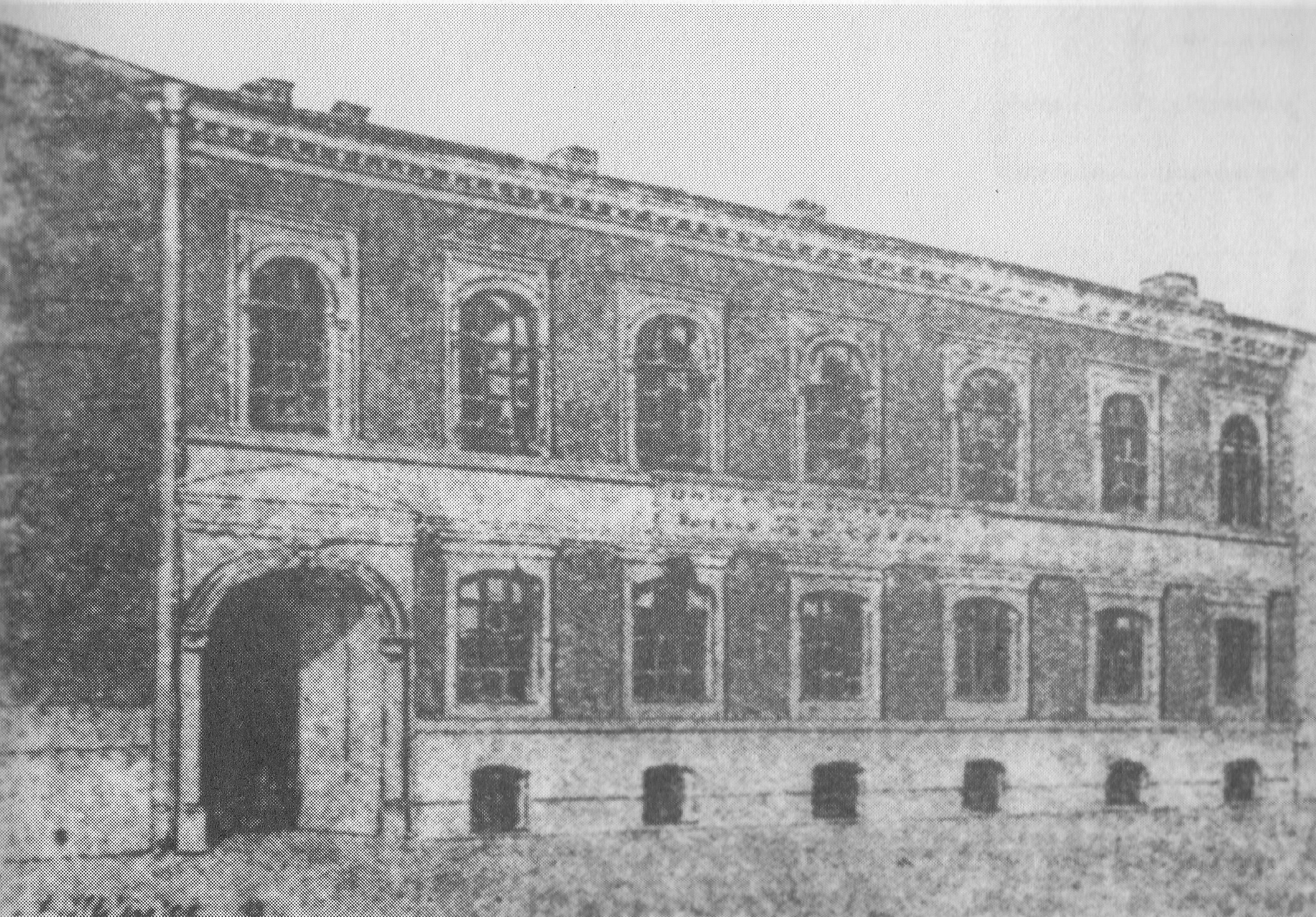
Building at 14 Litewska Street, where members of the unit tasked with burning the victims' bodies were held

Witness testimonies revealed that execution squads typically consisted of two SS men specifically assigned to the task. These individuals were reportedly compensated for their "work" with a regular ration of vodka. Meanwhile, the Germans used prisoners from the Security Police's corrective labour camp, located in the former Bauman Children's Home at 14 Litewska Street, for burning the bodies of victims and sorting their clothing and personal belongings. The Polish prisoners forced to assist in covering up the crimes were kept isolated from the other detainees. Additionally, every eight days, small groups of prisoners assigned to cremation duties were executed to eliminate witnesses. As a result, by mid-September 1944, only 12 remained out of the original group of approximately 100 inmates from the camp on Litewska Street. The last group of prisoners tasked with burning the bodies was executed by the Germans in the final days of the uprising.

During the Warsaw Uprising, the Germans murdered between 5,000 and 6,000 Poles in the Jordan's Garden and the ruins of the General Inspector of the Armed Forces. The Institute of National Remembrance estimates the death toll could be as high as approximately 10,000. The scale of the atrocities is underscored by a report from the Chief Commission for the Prosecution of Crimes against the Polish Nation in Warsaw (July 1946), which stated that human ashes weighing 5,578 kilograms were discovered in the General Inspector of the Armed Forces basements. In only a few cases were more detailed records about the victims of the mass executions in the police district successfully established. These included 160 men from Siekierki, as well as residents of buildings on Puławska Street (Nos. 1, 3, 5, 7), Marszałkowska Street (Nos. 31, 33, 35), Solec Street (No. 53), and Podchorążych Street.

== Other executions in the police district ==
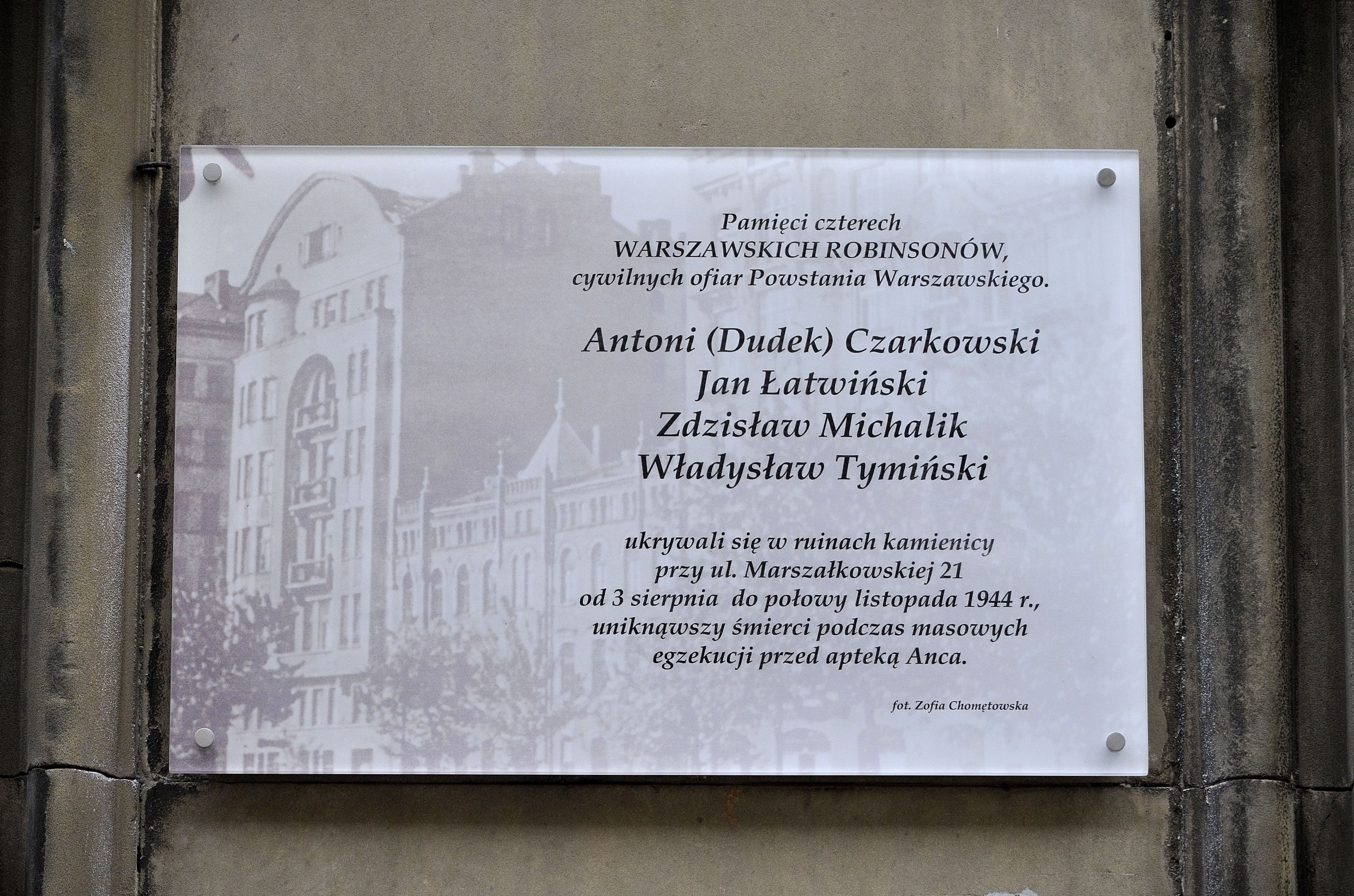
Plaque at 21/25 Marszałkowska Street commemorating four Robinson Crusoes of Warsaw who survived the execution at the "Anca" pharmacy

Jordan's Garden and General Inspector of the Armed Forces ruins were not the only locations within the police district where the Germans carried out mass executions of Polish prisoners and civilians. In early August, residents of houses along Marszałkowska Street, from Union of Lublin Square to Saviour Square, were executed en masse. The largest executions occurred in front of the "Anca" pharmacy at 21 Marszałkowska Street, at the corner of Oleandrów Street. Between 3 and 5 August 1944, approximately 100 men – residents of nearby buildings – were executed there. The bodies of the victims were thrown into the pharmacy's basement and burned. These executions were carried out by Ukrainian collaborators stationed at Szuch Avenue.

From 5 August, as more buildings fell into German hands, mass executions were also carried out near the modern-day site of the building at 27/35 Marszałkowska Street. Among the victims were scouts from Mokotów's Grey Ranks.

Additionally, during the Warsaw Uprising, hundreds of Poles were murdered within the Gestapo headquarters at Szuch Avenue or in its immediate vicinity.

== After the war ==
During exhumation work carried out after the war, employees of the Polish Red Cross and the District Commission for the Investigation of German War Crimes found human remains in the basements of the General Inspector of the Armed Forces building. These were placed in 76 coffins and buried at the Warsaw Insurgents Cemetery. The authors of Powstanie Warszawskie – rejestr miejsc i faktów zbrodni (Warsaw Uprising – Register of Places and Facts of Crimes) were able to identify only 38 names of those murdered during the executions in the police district. One of the victims was likely the famous pre-war clairvoyant Stefan Ossowiecki.

In 1954, the Provincial Court for the Capital City of Warsaw sentenced SS-Brigadeführer Paul Otto Geibel, who commanded German forces in the police district during the uprising and was fully responsible for the crimes committed there, to life imprisonment. On 12 October 1966, Geibel committed suicide in Mokotów Prison.

Dr. Ludwig Hahn lived in Hamburg for many years under his real name. He only stood trial in 1972 and, after a year-long trial, was sentenced to 12 years in prison. In a retrial, the Hamburg court of appeals increased the sentence to life imprisonment (1975). Hahn was released in 1983 and died three years later.

=== Commemoration ===
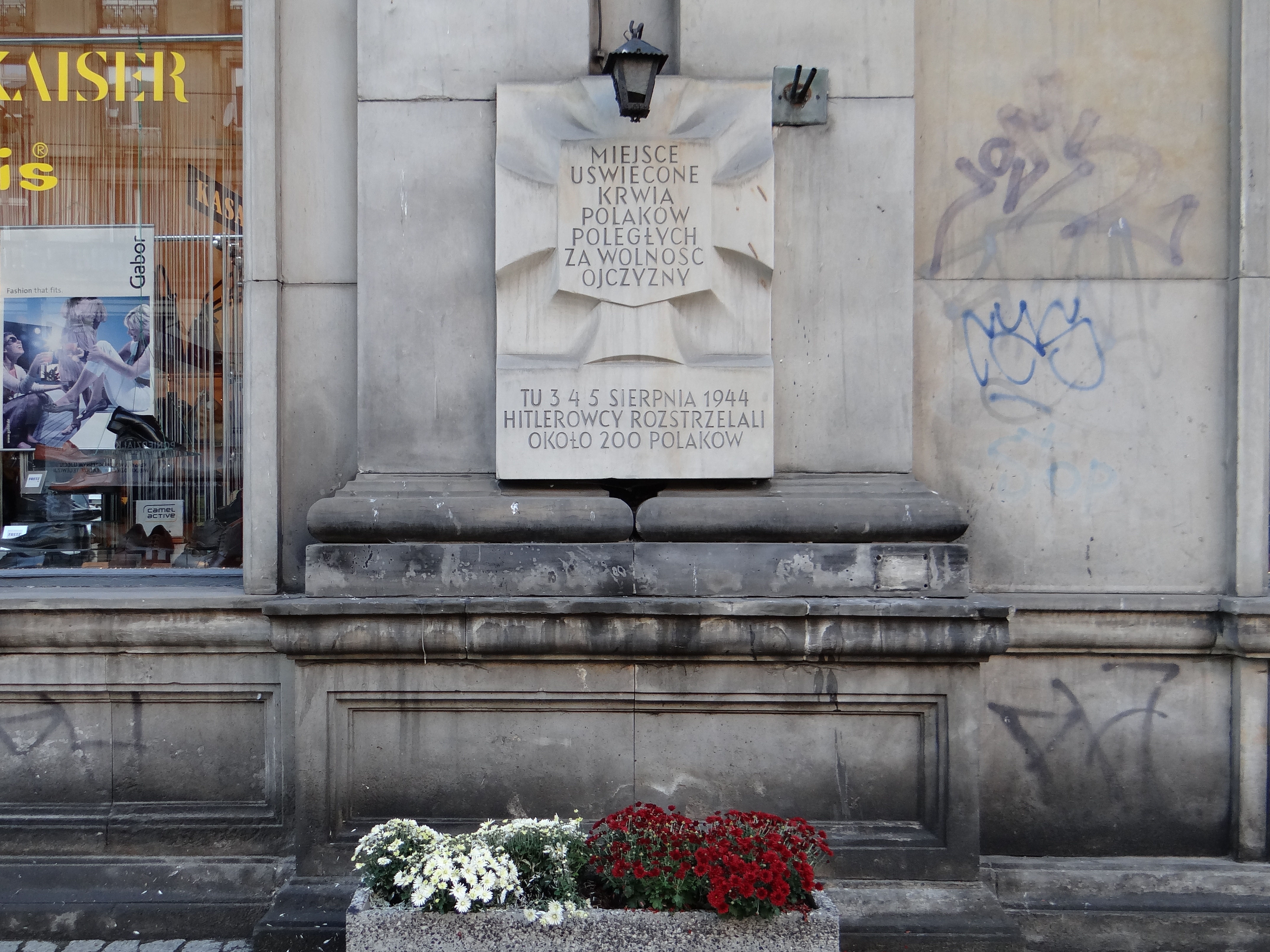
Plaque at 27/35 Marszałkowska Street commemorating the murdered residents of this street

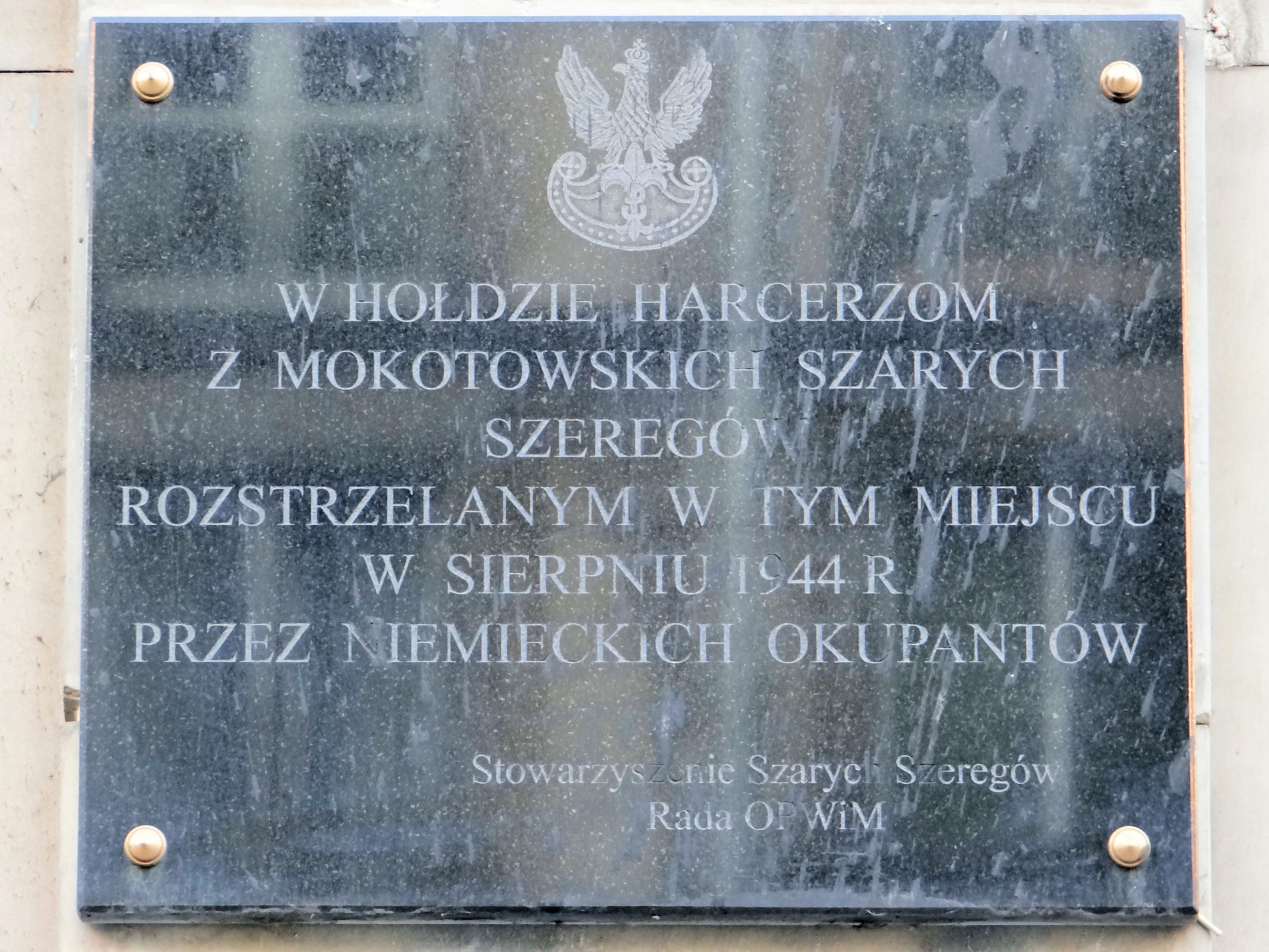
Plaque at 27/35 Marszałkowska Street commemorating the murdered scouts

The victims of crimes committed by the Germans during the Warsaw Uprising in the police district and neighbouring streets have been commemorated in the following ways:

- 1/3 Ujazdów Avenue – in the 1970s, a freestanding plaque was unveiled near one of the entrances to the southern wing of the building of the Chancellery of the Prime Minister, commemorating the thousands of Poles executed in the ruins of the General Inspector of the Armed Forces building (the plaque in its current form has been there since August 1996).
- Ujazdów Avenue, corner of Bagatela Street – in the 1950s, a freestanding plaque designed by Karol Tchorek was installed on the lawn at the intersection of both streets, commemorating the victims of executions carried out by the Germans in the Jordan's Garden area near Bagatela Street.
- 21 Marszałkowska Street – in 2015, a plaque was unveiled on the front wall of the building, commemorating the four Robinson Crusoes of Warsaw who, having survived the executions carried out in front of the "Anca" pharmacy, hid in the building until mid-November 1944.
- 27/35 Marszałkowska Street – in the 1950s, a plaque designed by Karol Tchorek was unveiled on the front wall of the building, commemorating the residents of the houses on Marszałkowska Street murdered by the Germans in the first days of August 1944. In later years, another plaque was installed, commemorating the scouts from the Mokotów Grey Ranks who were executed at this site.

== Bibliography ==
- Borkiewicz, Adam (1969). Powstanie warszawskie. Zarys działań natury wojskowej [Warsaw Uprising: Outline of Military Actions] (in Polish). Warsaw: Pax.
- Ciepłowski, Stanisław (2004). Wpisane w kamień i spiż. Inskrypcje pamiątkowe w Warszawie XVIII–XX w. [Inscribed in Stone and Bronze: Commemorative Inscriptions in Warsaw from the 18th to the 20th Century] (in Polish). Warsaw: Argraf. ISBN 83-912463-4-5.
- Datner, Szymon; Leszczyński, Kazimierz, eds. (1962). Zbrodnie okupanta w czasie powstania warszawskiego w 1944 roku (w dokumentach) [Crimes of the Occupier During the Warsaw Uprising in 1944 (in Documents)] (in Polish). Warsaw: MON.
- Motyl, Maja; Rutkowski, Stanisław (1994). Powstanie Warszawskie – rejestr miejsc i faktów zbrodni [Warsaw Uprising – Register of Sites and Facts of Crimes] (in Polish). Warsaw: Instytut Pamięci Narodowej.
- Przygoński, Antoni (1980). Powstanie warszawskie w sierpniu 1944 r. [The Warsaw Uprising in August 1944] (in Polish). Vol. I. Warsaw: PWN. ISBN 83-01-00293-X.
- Serwański, Edward; Trawińska, Irena, eds. (1946). Zbrodnia niemiecka w Warszawie 1944 r. [German Crime in Warsaw, 1944] (in Polish). Poznań: Wydawnictwo Instytutu Zachodniego.
- Ludność cywilna w powstaniu warszawskim [Civilians in the Warsaw Uprising] (in Polish). Warsaw: Państwowy Instytut Wydawniczy. 1974.
