= Pawiak Prison Museum =

Coordinates: 52°14′47″N 20°59′26″E

Museum of Pawiak Prison
- Muzeum Więzienia "Pawiak"
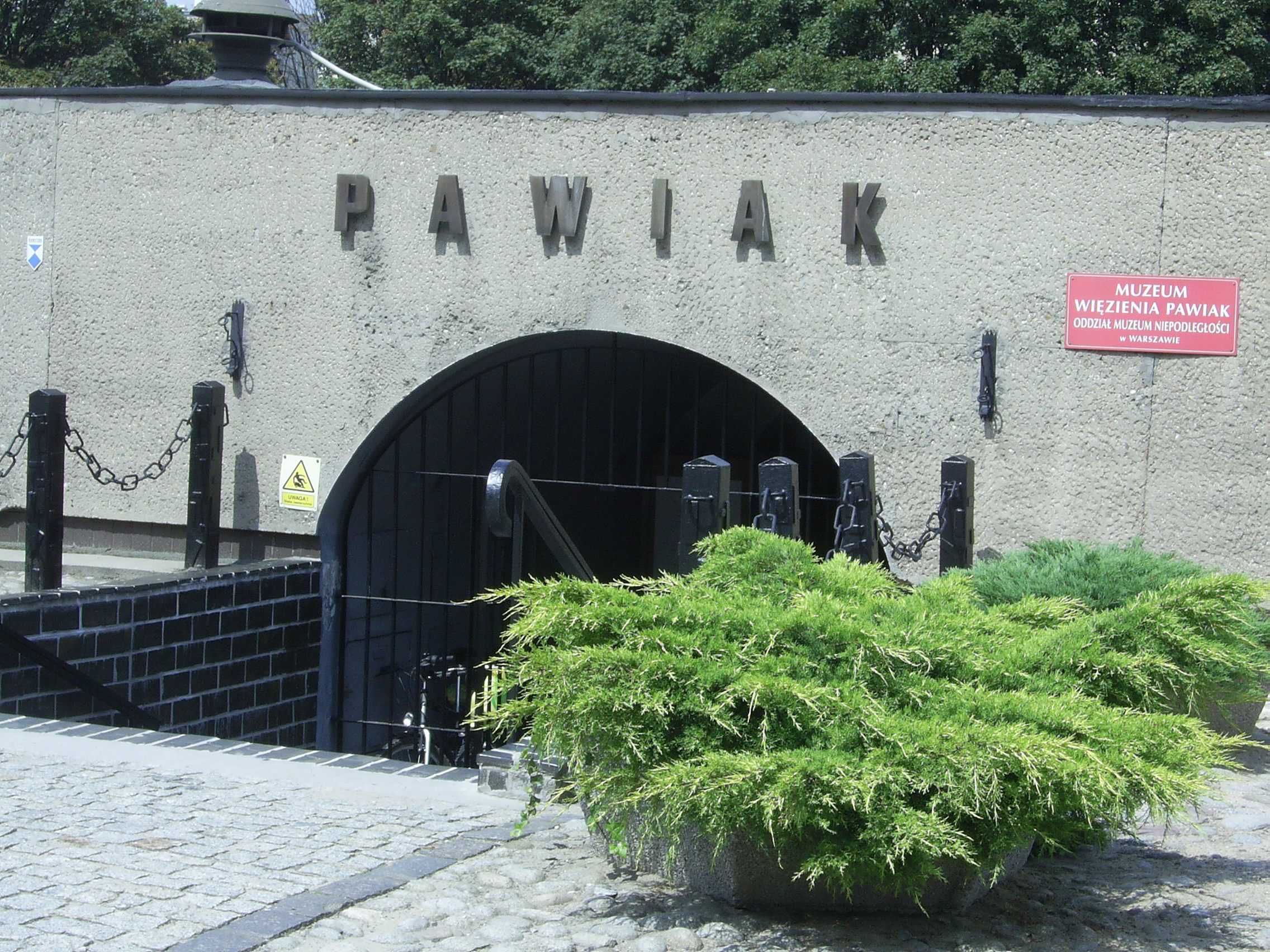
- Established: 1965
- Location: ul. Dzielna 24/26; Warsaw, Poland
- Type: History museum
- Website: Official website

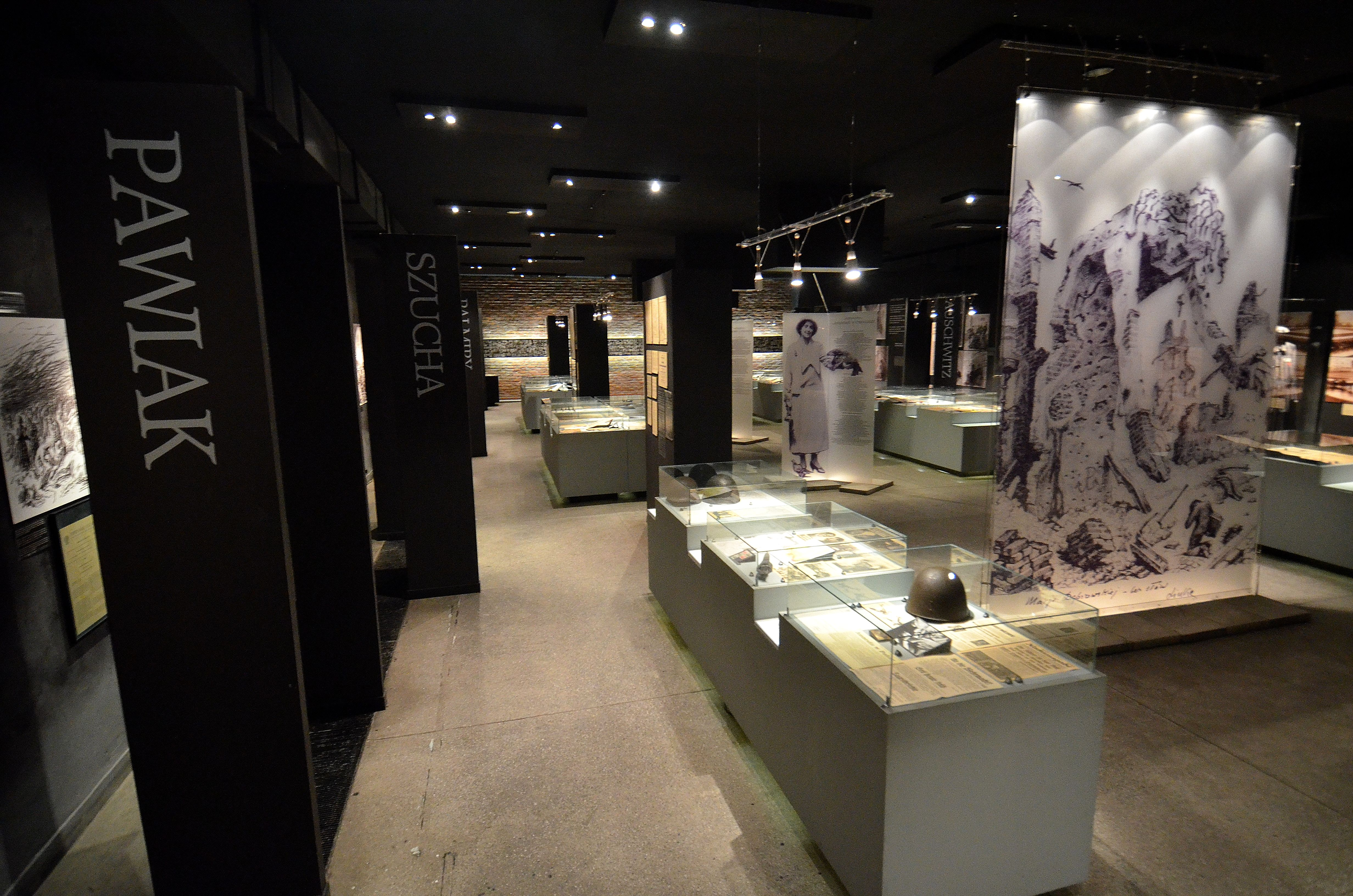
Part of the exhibition

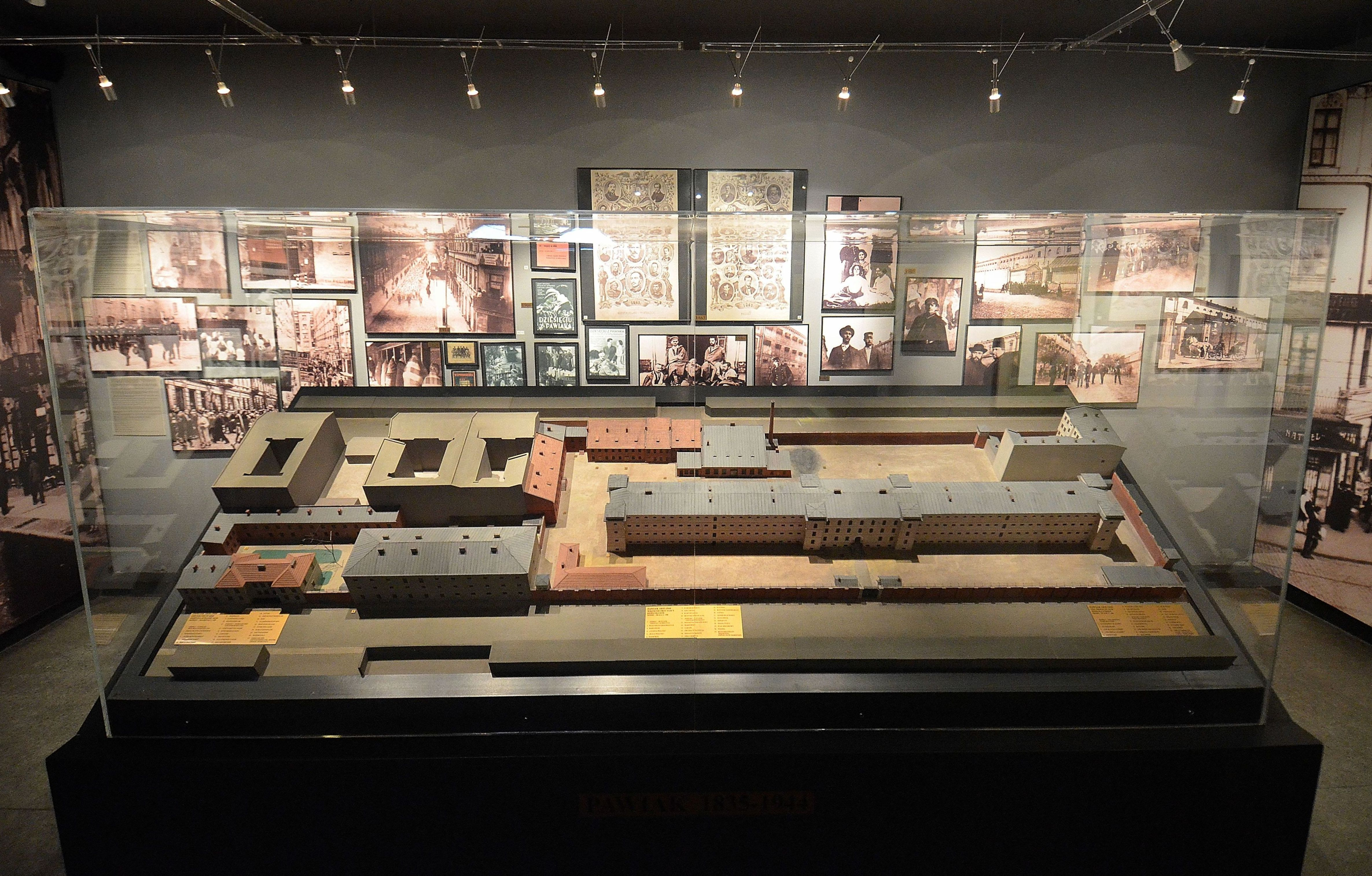
Model of the Pawiak prison

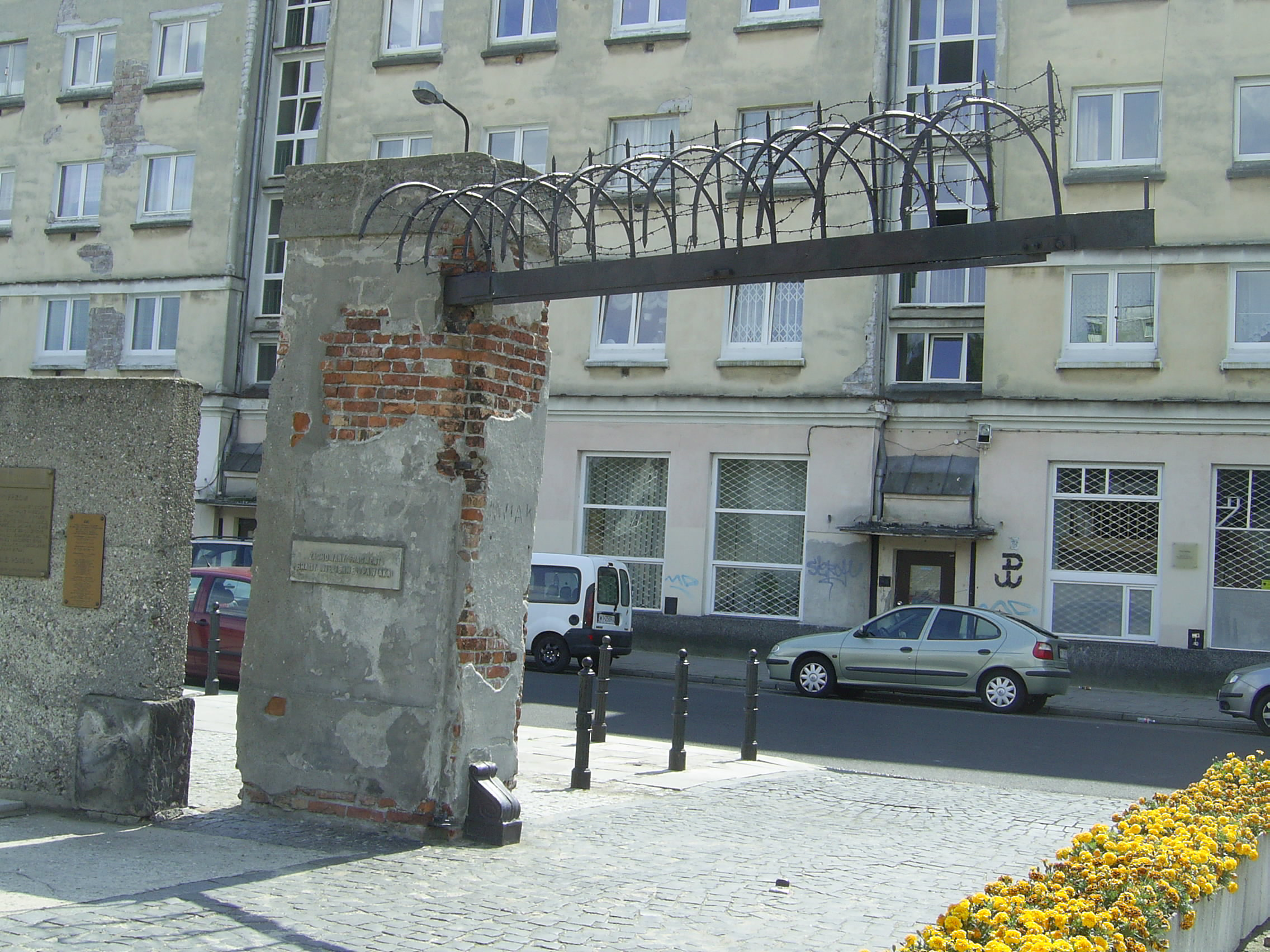
Surviving fragment of the prison gate "Pawiak"

Muzeum Więzienia "Pawiak" (Museum of Pawiak Prison) is a museum in Warsaw, Poland, established in 1965. It shows the history of Pawiak Prison which was used during the German occupation between 1939 and 1944.

== History ==
Pawiak Prison Museum was founded in 1965 on the initiative and with the participation of former Pawiak political prisoners. It was designed by architects Romuald Gutt and Mieczysław Mołdawa. The museum building was built in the foundations of the surviving underground casemates of the prison which was blown up by the Germans in August 1944. During the construction, items from the rubble, including object grilles, hinges, locks and fittings, documents, equipment and items used by the prisoners were recovered.

Monuments important to Pawiak also include: a pillar represents a part of the entrance gate, the Monument Tree of Pawiak (which is bronze copy of the famous elm, witness to its history - on which the victims' families since 1945 have placed the epitaph plates), concrete wall of sandstone blocks surrounding the grounds of the Museum, with symbolic sculptures by Tadeusz Łodziana and Stanisław Słonina, as well a monument within the old prison courtyard: an obelisk by Zofia Pociłowska.

In a reconstructed courtyard there are marble plaques at specific points and an entrance going down to the morgue from the street.

On the other side of the avenue now named for John Paul II, crossing the former prison's grounds, is the site of the women's prison Serbia, where there is a plate commemorating the bravery and suffering of its prisoners.

Since 1990, the Museum of Pawiak Prison, together with the Mausoleum of Struggle and Martyrdom is a branch of the Museum of Independence in Warsaw.

== Education ==
The museum organizes historical education:

- on March 26 it has a meeting with scouts in a nationwide campaign to remember Operation Arsenal;
- in the second half of September, Remembrance Days for Pawiak are addressed mainly to the younger generation. Lectures by well-known historians, school participation programs, and historical and literary scenes performed by actors from Warsaw, who participate in workshops to connect with Pawiak's history and that of the Polish Underground State.

Pawiak Museum lessons are conducted about:

- Generation Janka Bytnara;
- The ethos of the Polish Underground State;
- Polish Underground State and Pawiak.

The program is a planned lecture lesson by a historian. Visitors to the exhibition have the ability to listen to recordings of secret messages and artistic educational performances.

An important element of the research workshop Museum are thematic and personal files for the entire duration of the prison. Particular attention is paid to the ever-growing number of files about prisoners from the years 1939-1944, useful not only to historians or scholars but also for former prisoners (including in their efforts to gain compensation). Approximately 50% of the original documentation of this period was destroyed by the Germans.
