= Przebendowski Palace =

Historic building in Poland

Coordinates: 52°14′43.45″N 21°0′15.34″E

- Pałac Przebendowskich
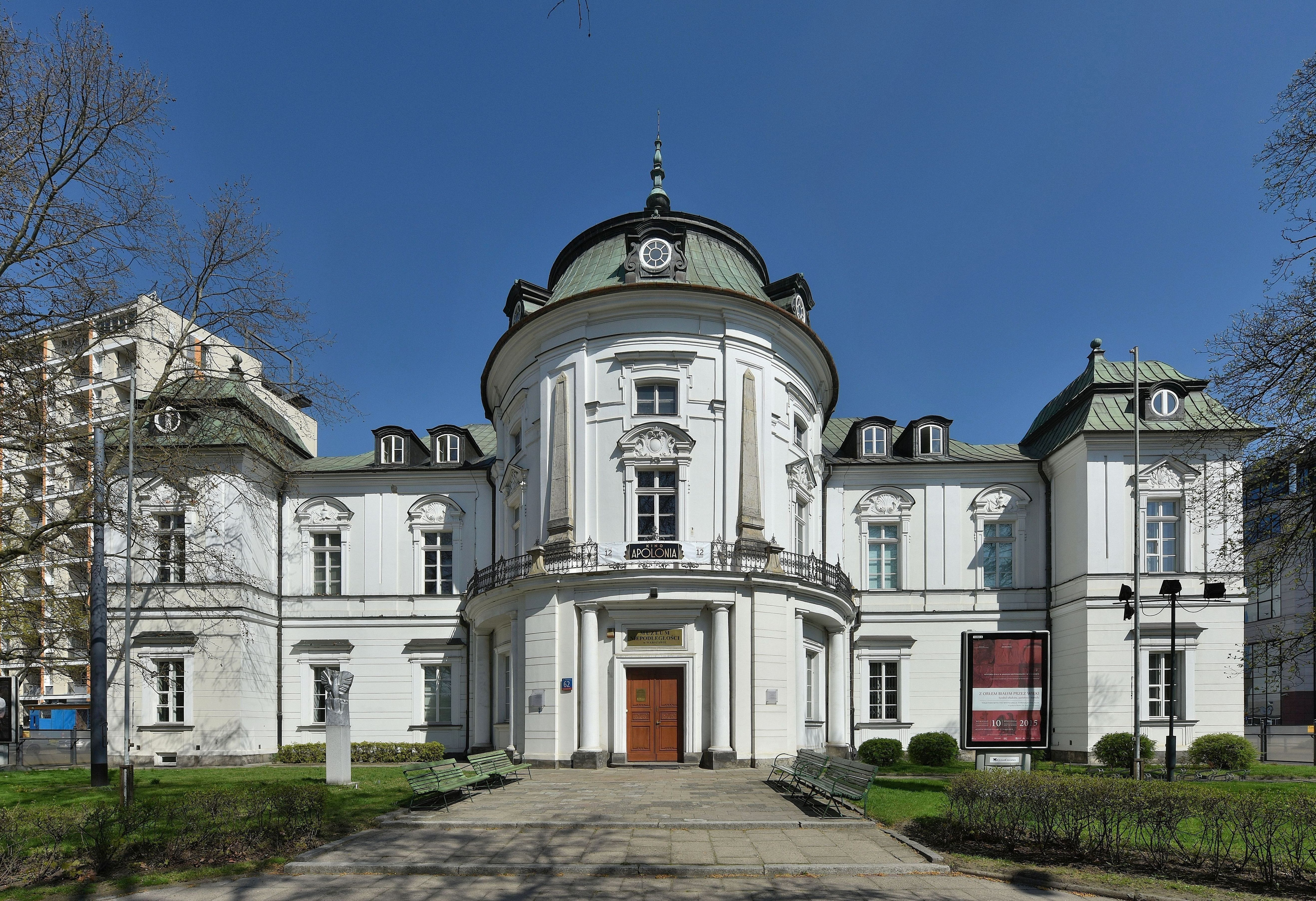
- Przebendowski Palace, Western façade
- Interactive map of the Przebendowski Palace area

General information
- Architectural style: Baroque
- Location: al. Solidarności 62, Warsaw, Poland
- Construction started: 1728, 1948–1949
- Demolished: 1944
- Client: Jan Jerzy Przebendowski

Design and construction
- Architect: Jan Zygmunt Deybel

Przebendowski Palace (Polish: Pałac Przebendowskich, pronounced: [pʂɛbɛnˈdɔfskʲi]) is a Baroque palace in Warsaw, built in the first half of the 18th century for Jan Jerzy Przebendowski, currently the seat of the Polish Museum of Independence. It is located between the carriageways of the main road 62 "Solidarności" Avenue (the former address was 14 Bielańska).

== History ==
The palace was built in the Baroque style around 1730, on the ruins of an earlier building for the Crown Treasurer, Jan Jerzy Przebendowski. Its designer was Jan Zygmunt Deybel. After Jan Jerzy Przebendowski's death, the palace was inherited by his daughter Dorothy Henrietta, then by Piotr Jerzy Przebendowski.

After the property was inherited by Ignacy Przebendowski, it was rented from 1760-1762 to palace diplomat and Member of the Spanish Court, Pedro Pablo de Bolea, who started the palace's famous masked balls. Ignacy Przebendowski sold the palace in 1766, to Constance Lubienska of Łubna, and in 1768 all rights were acquired by Constance's husband, the Royal Treasurer Roch Kossowski.

In the first half of the 19th century, the palace was converted into a tenement house. The palace housed such establishments as a wax figures museum, restaurant, cafe, printing house and a Trade Tribunal.

From 1863 to 1912 it belonged to Jan Zawisza, and after his death, to his wife Elżbieta and daughter Maria. In 1912, it was acquired by the Prince Janusz Radziwiłł, Ordynat of Ołyka and owner of Nieborów Palace.

Around 70% of the building was destroyed during the Warsaw Uprising (World War II), and was taken from Janusz Radziwiłł in 1947, and rebuilt under supervision of Brunon Zborowski in 1949, together with a major throughroad. During the People's Republic of Poland it served as the Central Museum to Lenin, opened on April 21, 1955.

Since 1990, the building has housed the office of the Museum of Independence (Polish: Muzeum Niepodległości w Warszawie).

From 2000 to 2009, it also functioned as the Cinema Paradiso (Kino Paradiso) - named after the Italian movie of the same name - which was run by distributor Solopan for challenging and non-commercial films of high artistic interest. The projectors were removed during a renovation.

In 2019, the palace's exterior as well as interiors underwent an extensive refurbishment.

== Bibliography ==
- Anna Saratowicz, Pałac Przebendowskich, Warszaw 1990, ISBN 8301096233 .
- Charles Mórawski Wieslaw Głębocki "Warszawa"-tourist guide, Warsaw 1982, KAW
