= Mausoleum of Struggle and Martyrdom =

Military museum in Warsaw, Poland

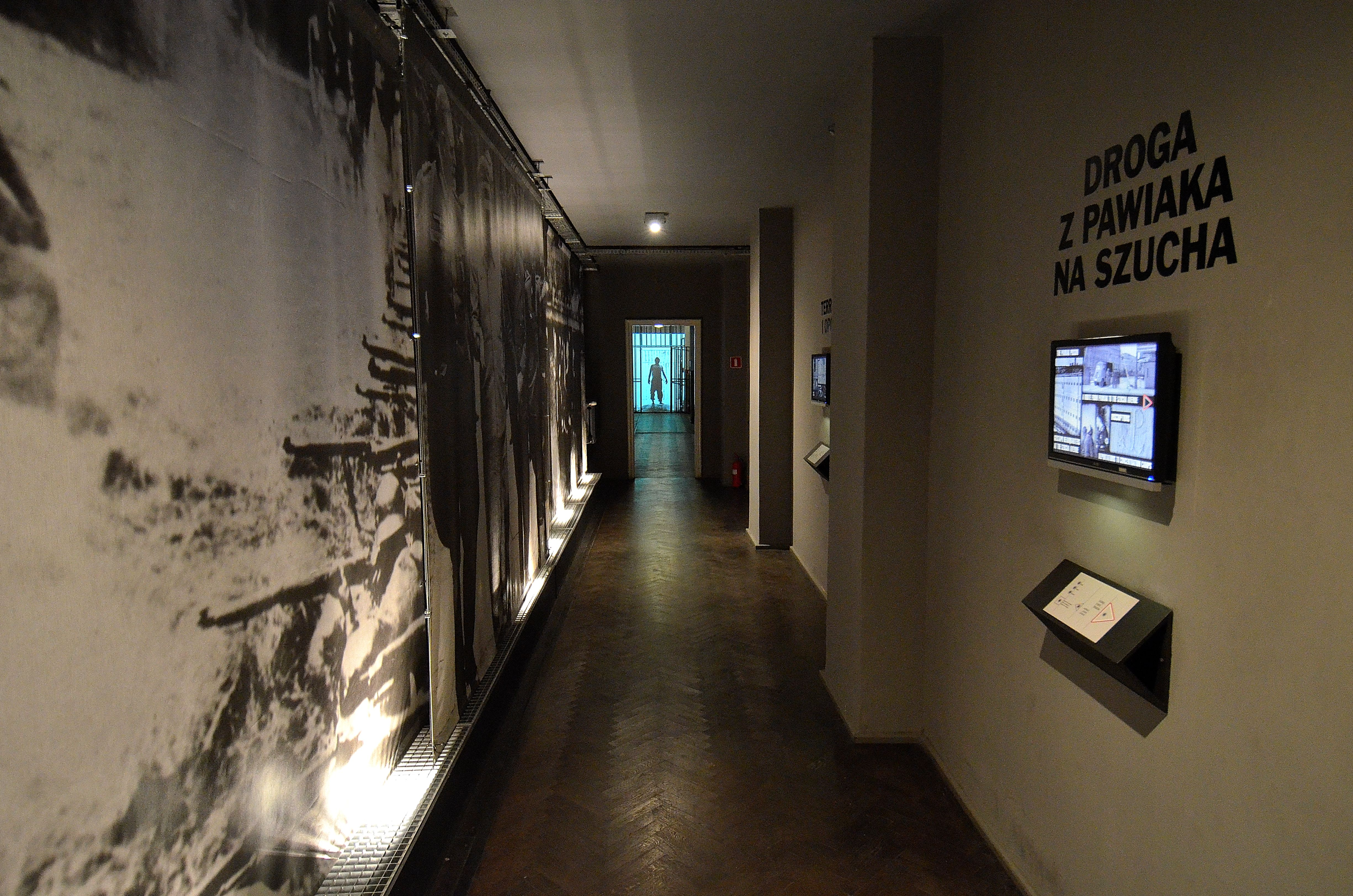
- Interior of the museum
- Established: 1952
- Location: Warsaw, Poland
- Coordinates: 52.217389°N 21.023472°E
- Type: National
- Public transit access: Politechnika

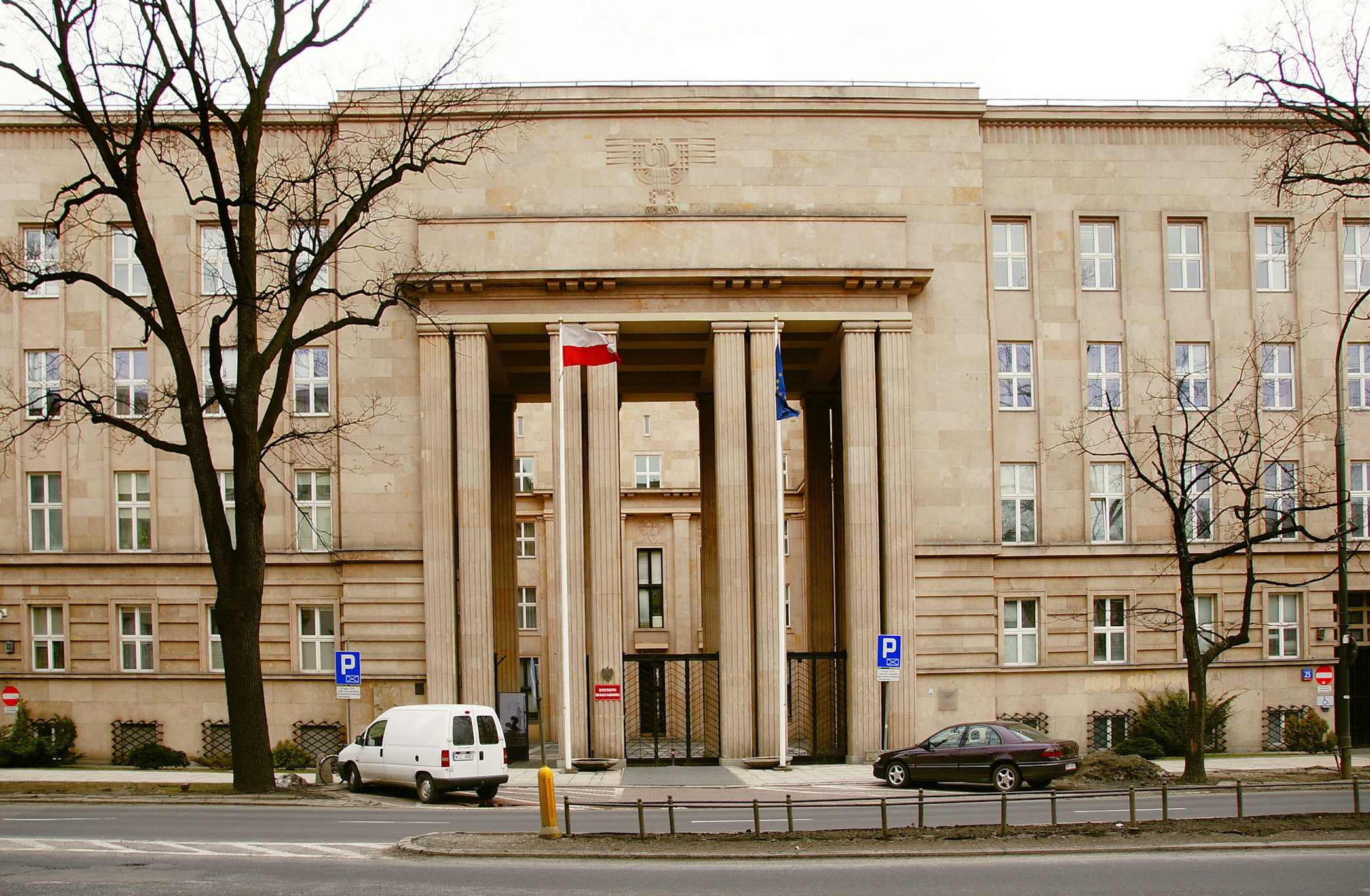
Building of the prewar Ministry of Religious Beliefs and Public Education, during World War II Gestapo Headquarters in Warsaw

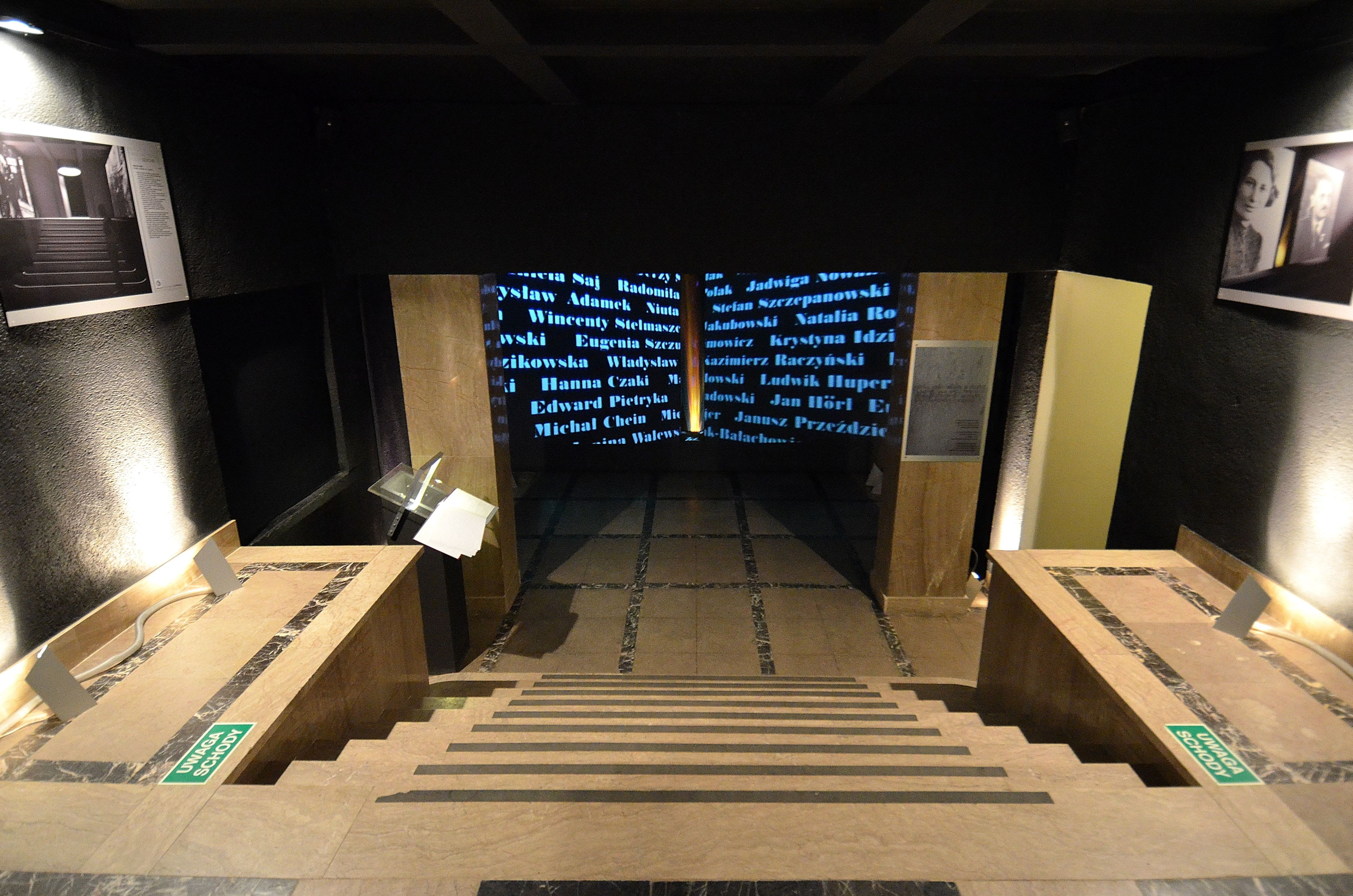
Entrance to the exhibition

Mausoleum of Struggle and Martyrdom (Polish: Mauzoleum Walki i Męczeństwa) is a museum in Warsaw, Poland. It is a branch of the Museum of Independence. The museum presents the conditions in which Polish patriots and resistance fighters were jailed by Nazi Germany during World War II.

The museum is located on Szucha Avenue, in the building of the prewar Ministry of Religious Beliefs and Public Education (now the Ministry of National Education). After the outbreak of World War II, the Nazis took over the building and turned it into the headquarters of the Sicherheitspolizei and Sicherheitsdienst police forces. The whole street was closed to Poles. In the basement of the building, the Nazis set up rough jails. Prisoners who were located there were usually freshly caught or transferred from Pawiak prison. Prisoners were subject to brutal interrogations, during which they were tortured and severely beaten. Torture was no exception for any prisoner, and even pregnant women were beaten and tortured. Polish prisoners often scratched out some sentences about beatings into the prison walls. Many of these inscriptions were also personal, patriotic or religious. In the 1960s research was conducted, and over 1,000 texts were conserved. The most famous of them is the following:

It is easy to speak about Poland.
It is harder to work for her.
Even harder to die for her.
And the hardest to suffer for her.

Many of the prisoners were killed during interrogations or died as a result of their injuries. During the Warsaw Uprising, the Germans mass executed thousands of Poles in the surrounding areas. Their corpses were later burned in neighbouring buildings. The extent of these killings were tremendous, human ashes found in the basement after the war weighed 5,578.5 kg (12,298 lb).

After the war the people of Warsaw treated the place as a cemetery, often bringing flowers and lighting candles. In July 1946 the Polish government decided to designate the site as a place of martyrdom, a testament to the suffering and heroism of the Poles. It was decided that the jails would remain untouched and turned into a museum. It was opened on 18 April 1952. Hallways, four group cells and ten solitary cells were preserved in their original condition. In accordance with the testimonies of prisoners, a room of a Gestapo officer was recreated. Several tons of human ashes were relocated to the Warsaw Insurgents Cemetery.

Museum visitors must be at least 14 years old.

== See also ==
- Executions in Warsaw's police district
