= Museum of Independence =

Coordinates: 52°14′43″N 21°0′15″E

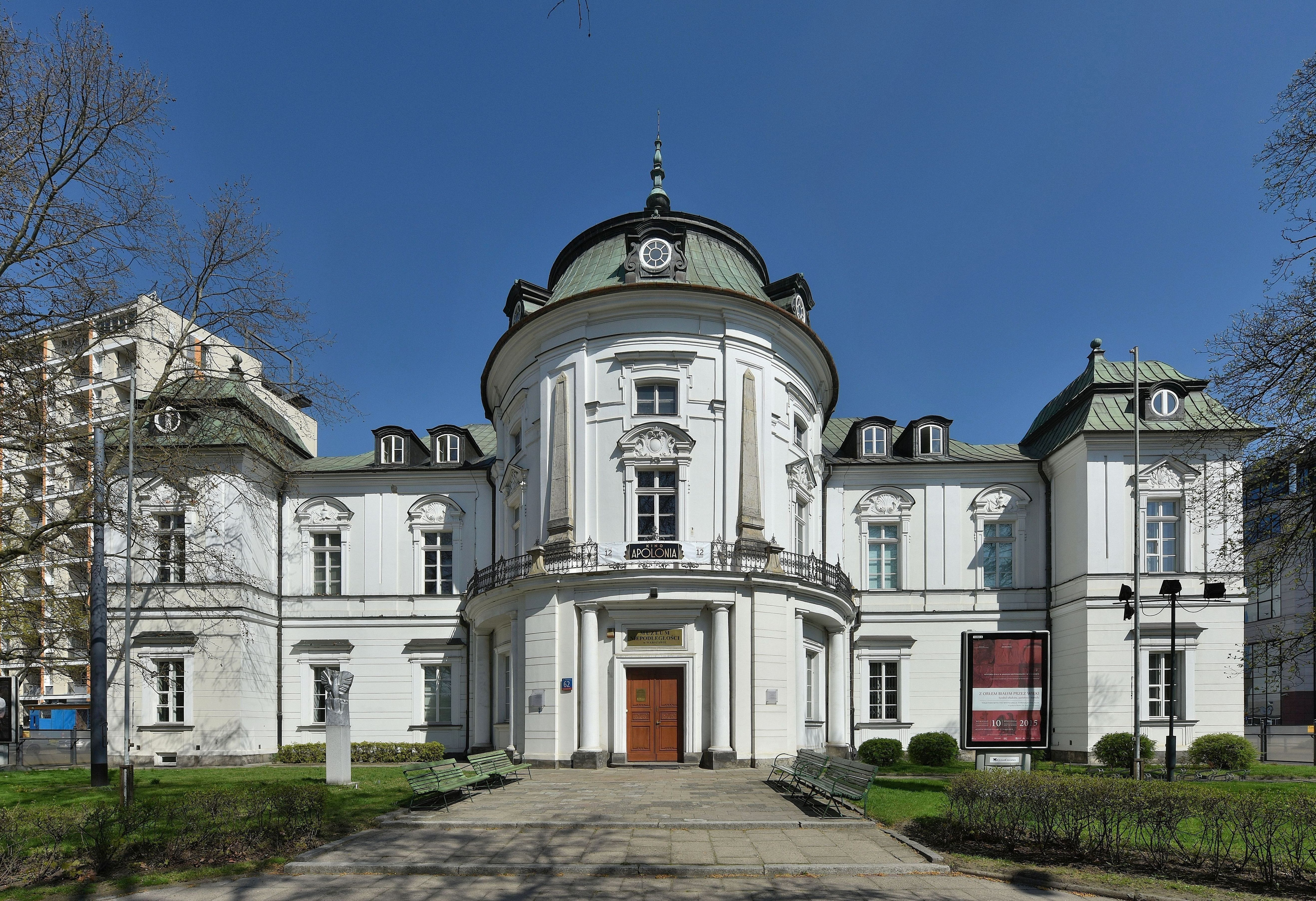
- Przebendowski Palace, seat of the museum.
- Established: 1990
- Location: al. Solidarności 62; Warsaw, Poland
- Type: History museum
- Public transit access: Ratusz Arsenal
- Website: Official website

The Museum of Independence (Polish: Muzeum Niepodległości) is a museum in Warsaw, Poland. It was established on 30 January 1990 as the Museum of the History of Polish Independence and Social Movements and is located in the former Przebendowski Palace at al. 'Solidarity' 62, but it also has these branches:

- X Pavilion Museum at the Warsaw Citadel
- Museum of Pawiak Prison
- Mausoleum of Struggle and Martyrdom

The headquarters of the museum was established by the Ministry of Culture and Art in the Przebendowski Palace, which had previously housed the Museum of Vladimir Lenin (1955–1989).

The museum covers the history of Polish battles and aspirations for independence from the Kościuszko Uprising to the modern day.

In 1991, the facility received its current name. In 1992, the Museum of Independence received the status of a National Cultural Institution. From 1990 to 2009 the director was Andrzej Stawarz. Currently the director of the facility is T. Skoczek.
