= Warsaw Insurgents Cemetery =

Cemetery in Warsaw, Poland

Coordinates: 52°13′34″N 20°56′03″E

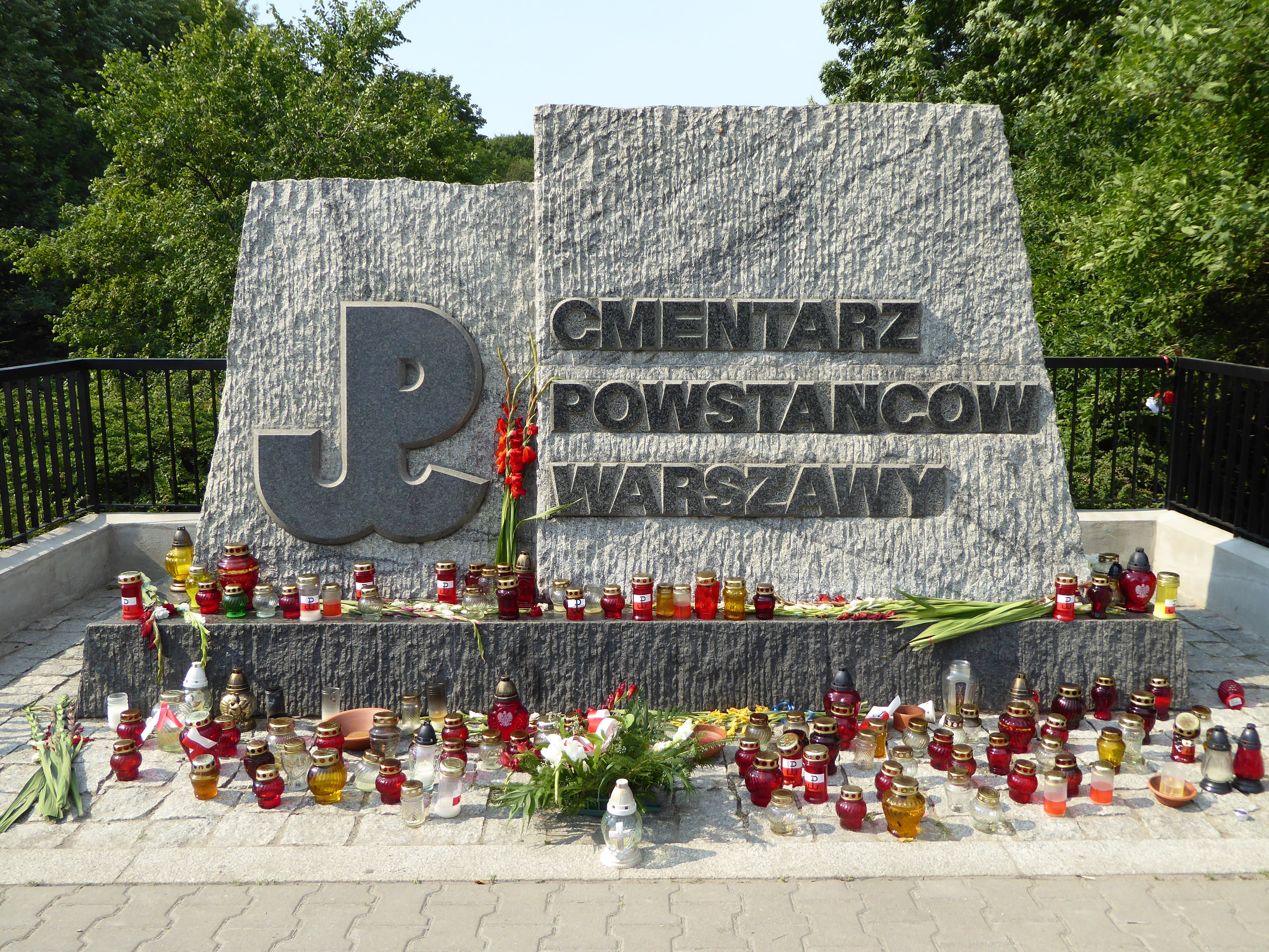
- Warsaw Insurgents Cemetery
- Interactive map of Warsaw Insurgents Cemetery

Details
- Established: 25 November 1945
- Location: Warsaw
- Country: Poland
- Type: Military
- Size: 1.5 ha (3.7 acres)
- Website: Official website

The Warsaw Insurgents Cemetery (Polish: Cmentarz Powstańców Warszawy) is located at 174/176 Wolska Street in the Wola district of Warsaw. It was established in 1945 and occupies 1.5 hectares (3.7 acres).

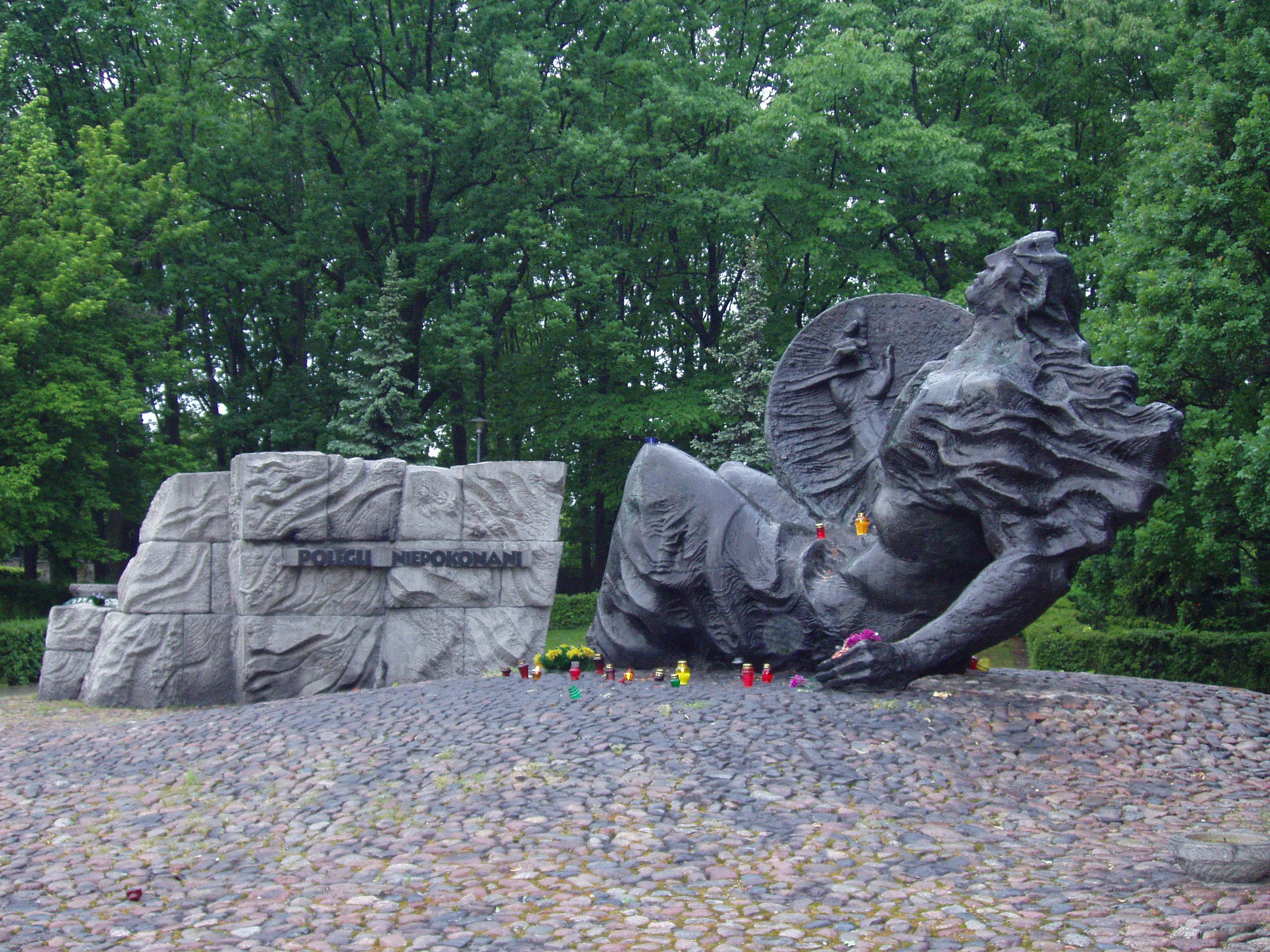
Monument to The Fallen Unconquerable in Warsaw Insurgents Cemetery

It is the largest burial site of victims of the Warsaw Uprising, which broke out on 1 August 1944 and lasted until 2 October 1944. Approximately 104,000 people (mainly persons unknown) are buried in the cemetery, mostly in collective graves. Its centrepiece is the monument to The Fallen Unconquerable (Polish: Polegli - Niepokonani), created by Professor Kazimierz Zemła, under which the ashes of 50,000 victims of the uprising are buried. The monument was unveiled in 1973.

Approximately 10,000 Polish resistance fighters and 200,000 civilians were killed during the 63 days of the Warsaw Uprising. Thousands of victims were buried in makeshift graves all over Warsaw and thousands more were never identified or given any sort of burial. The huge task of exhuming and re-burying the dead began in 1945. The first transfers of human remains to the newly created Warsaw Insurgents Cemetery began in November of that year and the remains of victims from all over the capital continued to be buried there for the next two years.

Other victims of World War II are also buried within the cemetery, including defenders of Warsaw during its siege by the Germans in September 1939 and Warsaw inhabitants murdered during the German occupation. Most of these are also persons unknown. Warsaw Insurgents Cemetery is adjacent to the Wola Cemetery (Polish: Cmentarz Wolski).

== Selected gallery ==
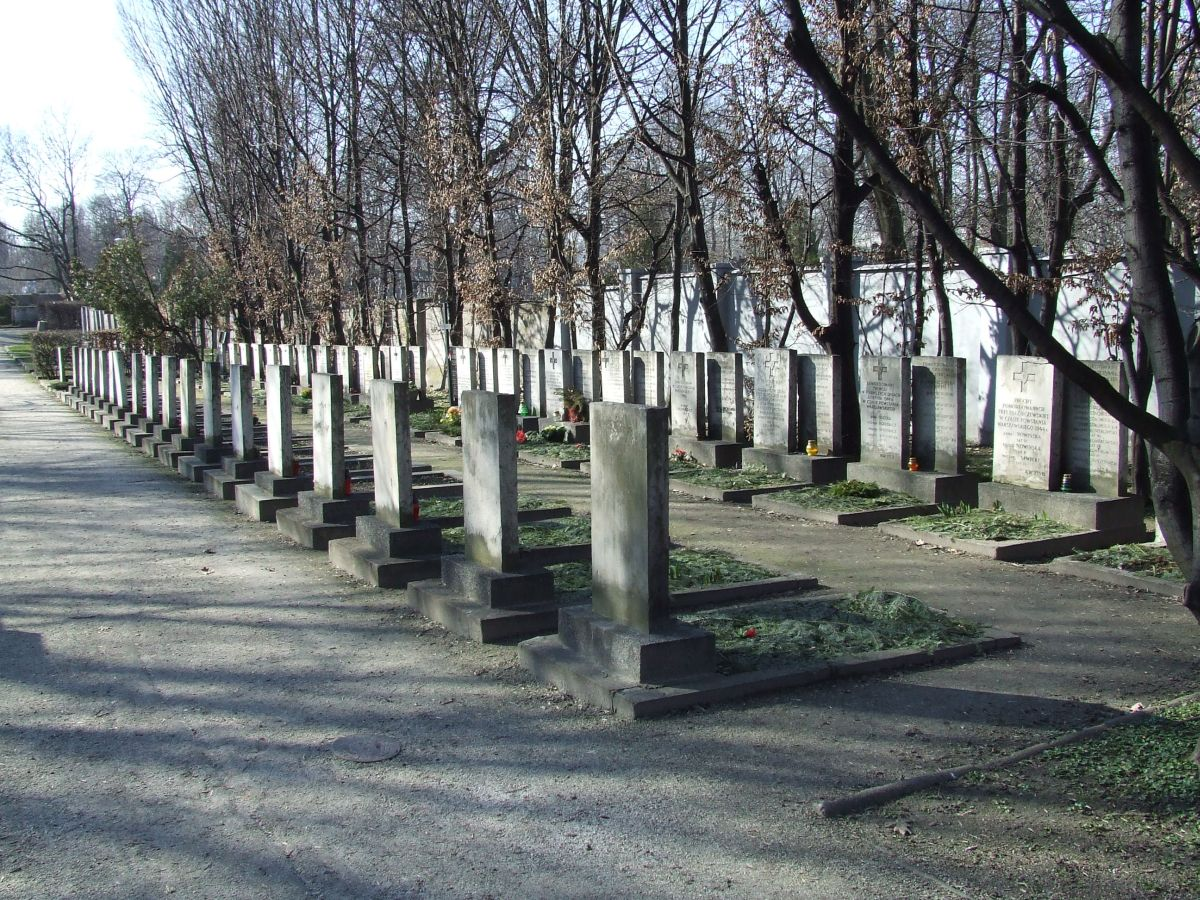
Graves of civilian victims of the Warsaw Uprising

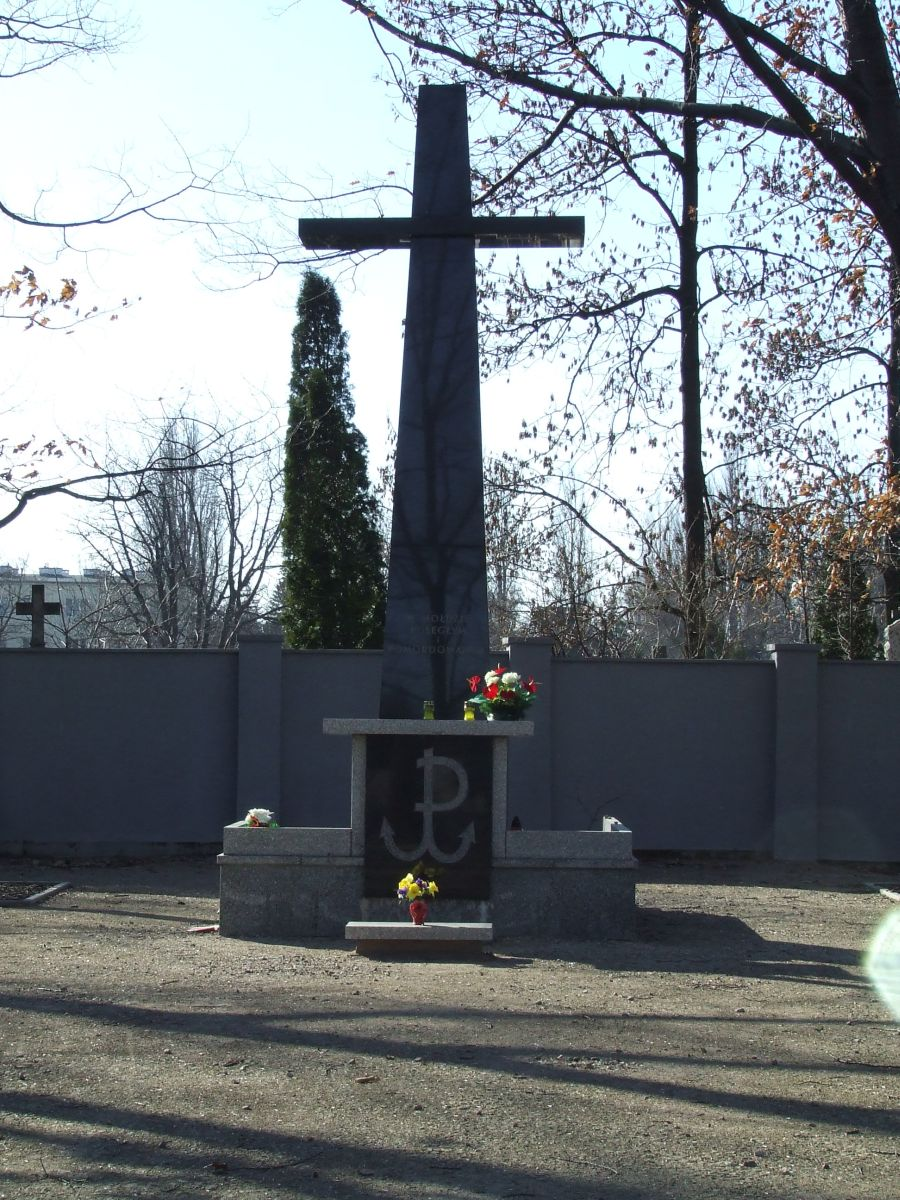
A monument in honour of the fallen, designed by Tadeusz Wyrzykowski

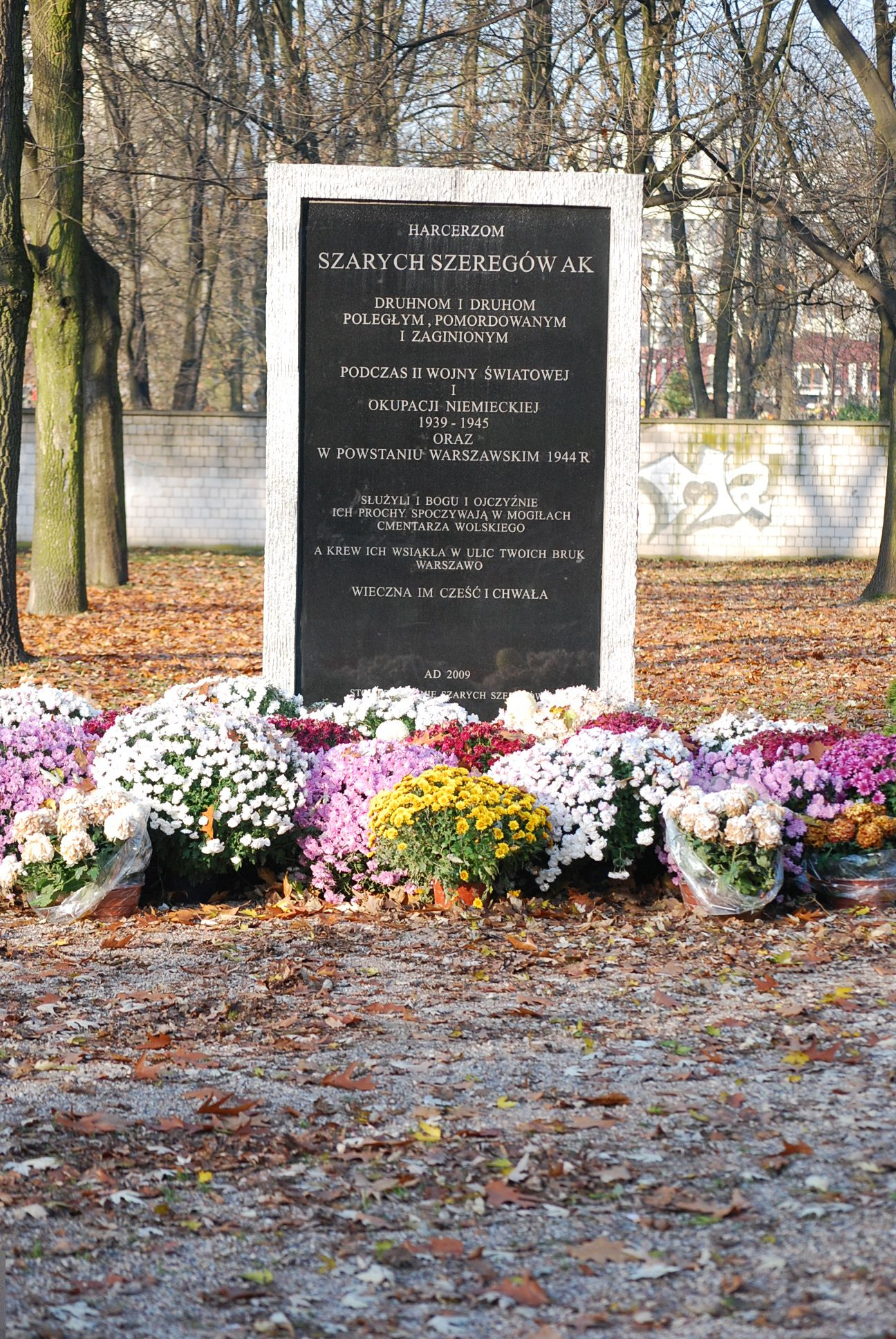
Szare Szeregi (Grey Ranks) memorial

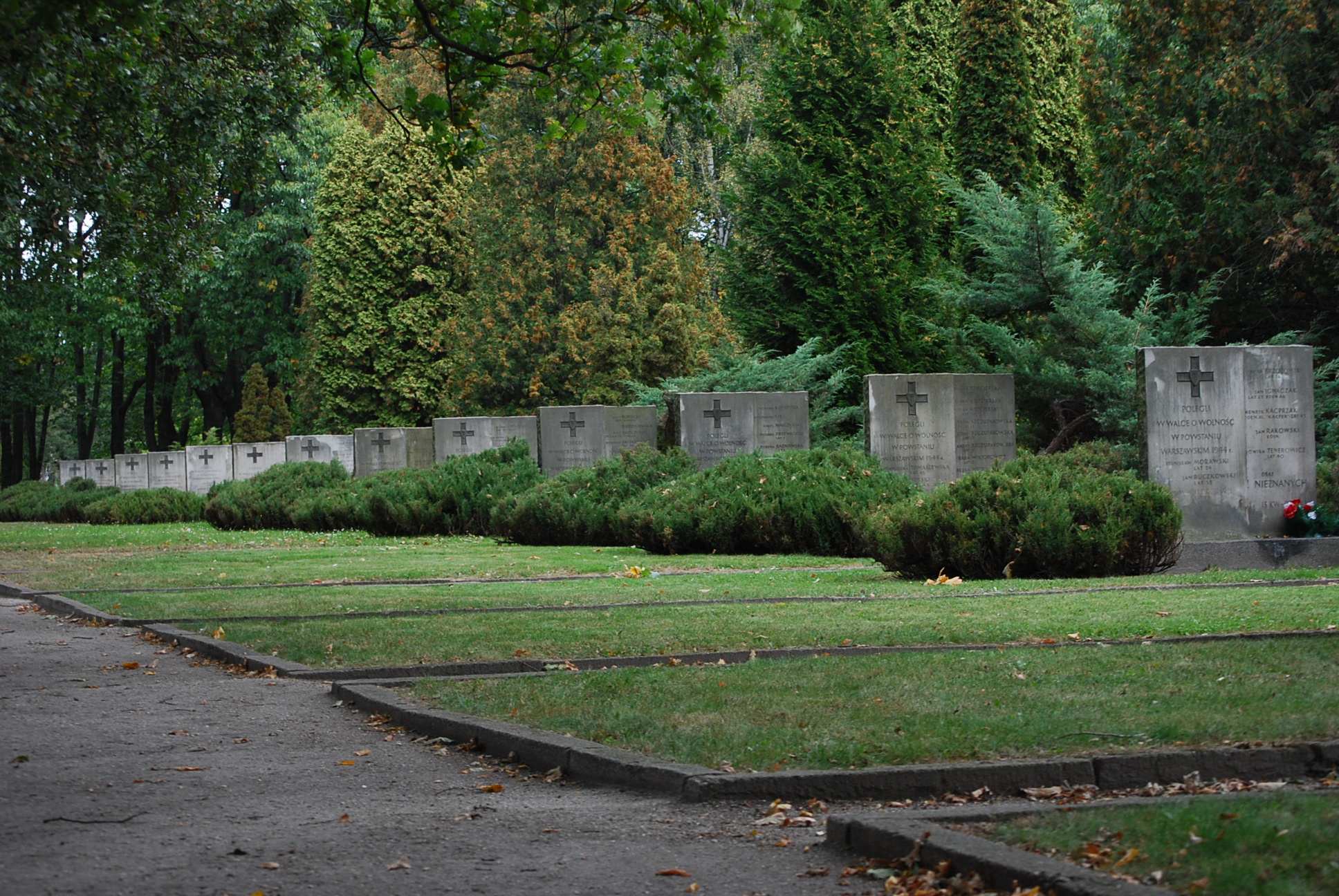
Collective graves of victims of the Warsaw Uprising

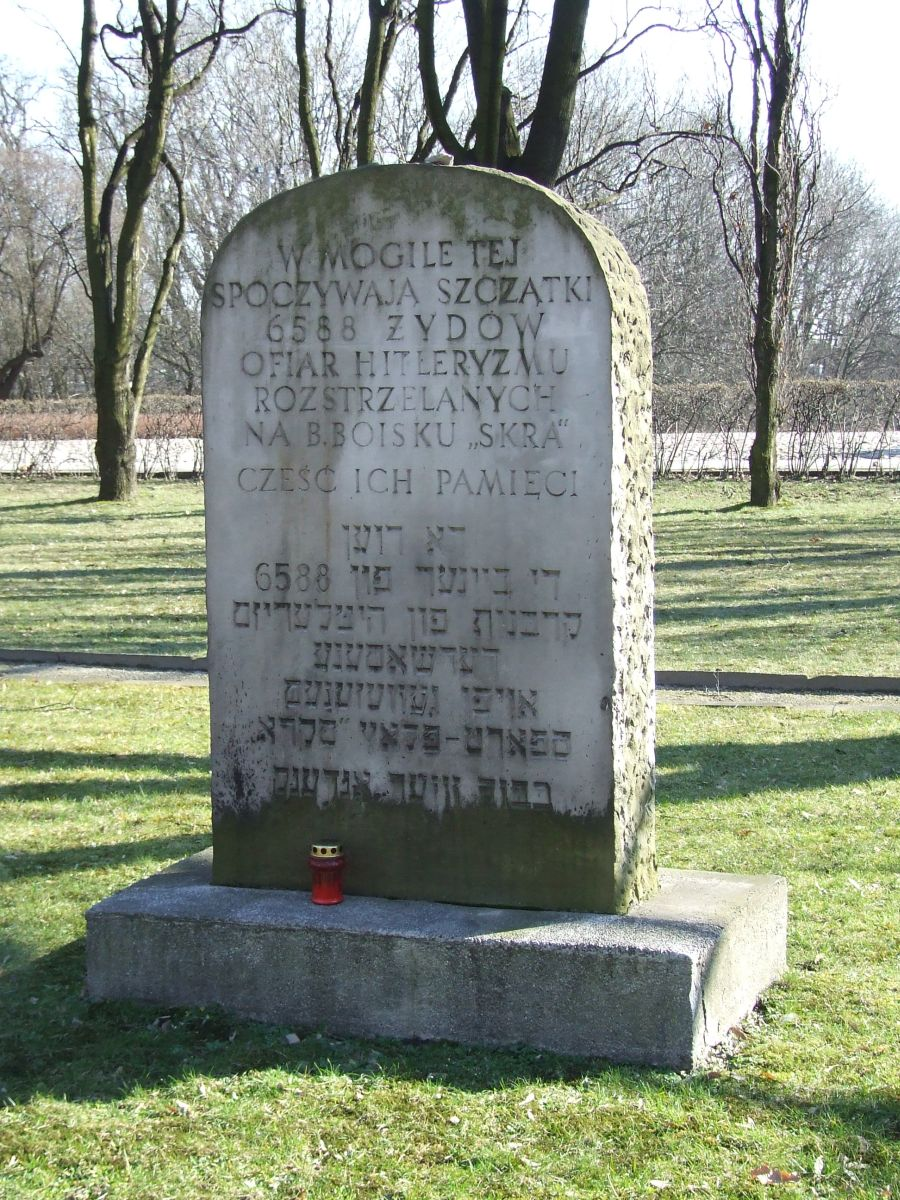
A collective grave for 6,588 Jews exhumed from the "Skra" Stadium

== See also ==
- Warsaw Uprising
- Wola massacre
- Ochota massacre
- Planned destruction of Warsaw
- German occupation of Poland
- Polish resistance movement in World War II
- Home Army
