= Chronicles of Terror =

Internet archive

- Zapisy Terroru
- Headquarters of the Witold Pilecki Centre for Totalitarian Studies, which operates ZT
- Alternative name: ZT
- Location: 82 Sienna Street, Mirów, Warsaw
- Type: Digital
- Period covered: 1939-1945
- Website: chroniclesofterror.pl

Chronicles of Terror (Polish: Zapisy Terroru, ZT) is a digital repository established by the Witold Pilecki Centre for Totalitarian Studies in August 2016. Initially, it provided access to the depositions of Polish citizens who after World War II were interviewed as witnesses before the Main Commission for the Investigation of German Crimes in Poland. From 17 September 2017, the database also presents the accounts of Poles who fell victim to repressions perpetrated by Soviet totalitarianism.

== History ==
The Main Commission for the Investigation of German Crimes in Poland, set up in 1945, documented German crimes committed during World War II, conducted investigations and published the results of its activities. In 1949, its name was changed to the Main Commission for the Investigation of Hitlerite Crimes in Poland. The commission was active throughout the country.

The commission's tasks, their scope expanded to include Communist terror, were taken over by the investigative division of the Institute of National Remembrance (IPN) in 1998. The commission's documentation, including witness testimonies, was also passed over to the archives of the institute. Acting on the basis of an agreement dated 11 February 2016, the IPN started submitting digital copies of these materials with the objective of making them available over the internet. The Chronicles of Terror website premiered on 4 August 2016, initially providing access to a database containing more than 500 testimonies given before the commission.

On 25 January 2017 the Witold Pilecki Centre for Totalitarian Studies signed an agreement with the Hoover Institution, pursuant to which Chronicles of Terror would be supplemented by depositions relating to Communist crimes, taken from the archives of Anders' Army. After World War II, documents containing the accounts of Poles, both soldiers and civilians who left the Soviet Union together with the Polish Army, were deposited with the Hoover Library, for it was feared that they could have been seized by the Communist authorities.

== Testimony database and its collections ==
"Chronicles of Terror" contains nearly 4,000 depositions (the majority are also available in English translations). Accounts describing crimes committed during World War II in Warsaw and its environs were published in first order. The database also holds depositions made by former prisoners of extermination camps and concentration camps. Plans have been made for its progressive expansion by the addition of testimonies concerning events that occurred in other locations.

In the spring of 2017, it published more than 500 depositions depicting the German Terror in Kielce region, and these were followed in October 2017 by accounts describing crimes committed by the invaders in Radom region. The following topics are addressed in the database.

=== Auschwitz ===
The database contains depositions pertaining to the complex of German camps in Oświęcim. These testimonies include the accounts both of prisoners of the concentration camp itself and of the Auschwitz-Birkenau extermination camp. A number of them depict the medical experiments carried out on inmates and Sonderkommando members fate.

=== Street executions in occupied Warsaw ===
Chronicles of Terror contains approximately 100 testimonies relating to the street executions that were regularly carried out in occupied Warsaw. The accounts include depositions made both by eyewitnesses and the families of victims. Selected testimonies have been brought together in a collection entitled Reign of Terror – Executions in the Streets of Warsaw.

=== Pawiak ===
The Chronicles of Terror archive also has in its possession a dozen or so depositions made by former inmates of Pawiak, including those of its female ward, the so-called Serbia. These testimonies describe conditions existing in the prison, the methods of torture used, and the murders committed within its walls. A part of them has been gathered in the collection entitled Pawiak – The Warsaw Execution Site.

=== Ochota massacre ===
More than 30 depositions devoted to the Ochota massacre are available in the database. Amongst them are the accounts of employees of the Radium Institute: Antoni Borowiecki, Bronisława Mazurkiewicz and Józef Laskowski, who were eyewitnesses to the crimes committed at the facility. The website also presents depositions made by Karol Cugowski, Józef Górski and Lucjan Majchrzak, who survived the mass executions carried out in Grójecka Street despite having suffered gunshot wounds. The murders and rapes committed in the Zieleniak have been referred to, among others, in the account of Kazimierz Sucharzewski, who was forced by the executioners to assist in the burning of the bodies of victims, and that of an officer of the Home Army, Fryderyk Korsak-Bartonezz. Romuald Jakubowski and Maria Lachert, in turn, witnessed the murder of the wounded by German units in field hospitals. The remaining accounts contain descriptions of crimes committed, among others, in Kolonia Lubeckiego, Kolonia Staszica and the so-called Reduta Wawelska (Wawelska Stronghold). Selected depositions have been gathered in the collection entitled Ochota Massacre – The Suffering of the District.

=== Wola massacre ===
The database holds more than 100 depositions concerning the Wola massacre. Amongst them is the testimony of Janina Rozińska, who was wounded by a grenade during the mass execution carried out at the Tramcar Depot in Młynarska Street, and of Wiesława Chełmińska, who, despite being shot, survived the series of murders perpetrated in St. Lazarus' Hospital. Wacław Dąbrowski and Father Bernard Filipiuk escaped death and were able to describe the mass shooting carried out at the corner of Górczewska and Zagłoby streets, and also the crimes perpetrated at the Wolski Hospital in Płocka Street. In turn, the account of Wanda Lurie (who was eight months pregnant at the time) relates to the execution conducted in the Ursus Factory at Wolska Street 55, during which she lost three children and herself received a number of injuries. Finally, Kazimierz Gębczyński provided testimony on the crimes committed at Staszica Street 15, where he himself received a gunshot wound. The database also contains the accounts of members of the so-called Verbrennungskommando (Wacław Dziewulski, Mieczysław Gurbiel, Witold Guzikowski, Mieczysław Miniewski, Stanisław Turek and Franciszek Zasada), who were forced by the Germans to assist in the burning of the bodies of victims. The remaining depositions refer, among others, to the crimes perpetrated by German units in Franaszek's Factory, Sowińskiego Park, and the area of Wolska Street and Górczewska Street. A part of these has been grouped in a special collection entitled Genocide in Wola – a district sentenced to death.

=== Treblinka extermination camp ===
The testimony database includes more than 30 depositions that describe the functioning of this extermination camp. The accounts of former inmates have been supplemented with those of railway employees – witnesses to the transports arriving in Treblinka. A selection has been incorporated in the batch entitled Treblinka – a complex for the extermination of the Polish Jews.

=== Crimes committed in the police district ===
"Chronicles of Terror" contains a few dozen depositions concerning the crimes perpetrated in the "Police District" during the Warsaw Uprising. Among others, they portray the mass executions held in the Open-air Kindergarten at Bagatela Street, in the ruins of the pavilion of the General Inspectorate of the Armed Forces and in Anc's Pharmacy, and also the events that took place in the Gestapo building at Szucha Avenue. Witnesses include the women who were used by the Germans to act as human shields for their tanks. Selected depositions have been brought together in the collection entitled Crimes in the "Police District" – Tragedy of Insurgent Warsaw.

=== Gulag and deported ===
This contains the depositions of people who had been arrested and sentenced to terms of imprisonment in corrective forced labor camps (Soviet forced labor camps). They provide graphic descriptions of the brutal interrogation methods used by the NKVD, the conditions existing in Soviet prisons and camps, and the back-breaking labor which the detainees were forced to perform. Many of the witnesses have also described how they were freed on the basis of the amnesty, and somehow managed to reach Anders' Army.

A separate section contains the testimonies of people who were deported to the Soviet Union in the years 1940–1941 on the basis of administrative decisions issued by the NKVD. These were primarily "enemies of the people" (as they were termed by the Soviet authorities), that is military settlers, foresters, civil servants, and members of their families. The deportees have described the conditions they were forced to endure during transport and at their points of destination. Numerous depositions depict the mind-numbing poverty that they faced while in exile. Some contain information about relations between the expellees themselves, and also their contacts with the local populace.

=== Polish soldiers in Soviet captivity ===
This batch of depositions was written down by Polish soldiers who following the invasion of Poland in September 1939 were detained by the Soviets as prisoners of war and ended up in NKVD prisoner of war (POW) camps or forced labor camps for POWs. Their accounts provide a description of life in the camps, of interrogation techniques, and the methods used by the NKVD to turn prisoners into informers, and also present the tools of Communist propaganda applied against Polish POWs. Following the amnesty, the majority of these witnesses enlisted in Anders' Army.

== Bibliography ==
- Biuletyn Głównej Komisji Badania Zbrodni Niemieckich w Polsce, Warszawa: Wydawnictwo Głównej Komisji Badania Zbrodni Niemieckich w Polsce, 1946–1949.
- Biuletyn Głównej Komisji Badania Zbrodni Hitlerowskich w Polsce, Warszawa: Wydawnictwo Ministerstwa Sprawiedliwości, 1951–1987.
- Główna Komisja Badania Zbrodni Niemieckich w Polsce i jej oddziały terenowe w 1945 roku : wybór dokumentów / przygot. Mieczysław Motas; Warszawa : Główna Komisja Badania Zbrodni Przeciwko Narodowi Polskiemu. Instytut Pamięci Narodowej, 1995
- Stępniak W., Dokumentacja losu Polaków na Wschodzie w zbiorach Instytutu Hoovera, ARCHEION CII, Warszawa 2000.
- Stępniak W., Archiwalia polskie w zbiorach Instytutu Hoovera, Warszawa : Naczelna Dyrekcja Archiwów Państwowych, 1997
- Wieliczko M., Biuro Dokumentów Wojska Polskiego na Obczyźnie w latach 1941-46, Roczniki UMCS, Lublin 2006.
