= Lubecki Colony =

Coordinates: 52°13′08″N 20°59′01″E

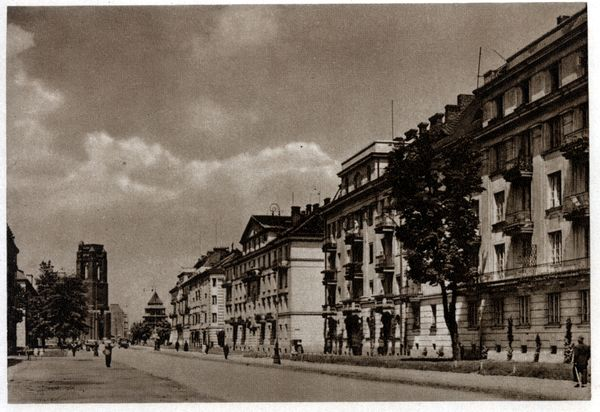
University Street in the 1930s

Lubecki Colony (Polish: Kolonia Lubeckiego, Polish pronunciation: [kɔˈlɔɲa lubɛt͡sˈkʲɛɡɔ]) is a historical housing estate in the Ochota district of Warsaw, Poland, bordered by the streets Fitrowa, Krzywickiego, Wawelska, Grójecka and Plac Narutowicza. The area is characterized by houses built during the interwar period, with many trees and green spaces.

== History ==
The local council had originally planned to build a park on the site, however it was later agreed the area was more suitable as a residential area to accommodate the growing number of people working in the city center.

Construction began in 1924, with the first buildings designed by several architects including Antoni Jawornicki, Aleksander Sygietyński, Wacław Weker and Teofil Wiśniowski, in the neoclassical style. By the 1930s, however, a more modernist style was incorporated into the estates design. During the Warsaw Uprising, between August 4 and 25, 1944, residents of the estate were embroiled in the so-called Ochota massacre, a series of mass murders, robberies and other crimes perpetrated primarily by the S.S. Sturmbrigade R.O.N.A., an anti-partisan group from Russia. An estimated 10,000 Ochota residents were murdered during this period.

== Bibliography ==
- Jarosław Zieliński, Z dziejów Ochoty: Kolonia Lubeckiego (1), Ochotnik nr 11 02/2006 ISSN 1734-5510
- Jarosław Zieliński, Z dziejów Ochoty: Kolonia Lubeckiego (2), Ochotnik nr 12 03/2006 ISSN 1734-5510
- Kolonia Lubeckiego w Spacerowniku Gazety Wyborczej
