= Grigol Peradze =

Georgian theologian

Saint Grigol Peradze
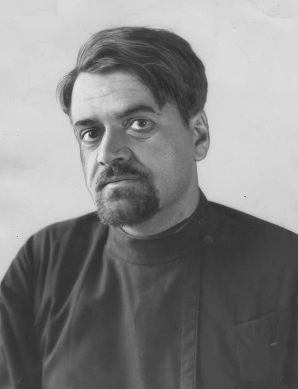
- St. Grigol Peradze, c. 1933

Hieromartyr and Archimandrite
- Born: 31 August 1899; Bakurtsikhe Village, Signakh uezd, Tiflis Governorate, Caucasus Viceroyalty, Imperial Russia (modern Bakurtsikhe, Signagi, Kakheti, Georgia)
- Died: 6 December 1942 (aged 43); Auschwitz Concentration Camp, German-occupied Poland
- Venerated in: Eastern Orthodox Church
- Canonized: September 1995 by Georgian Orthodox Church
- Feast: December 6

Grigol Peradze (Georgian: გრიგოლ ფერაძე; 13 September 1899 – 6 December 1942) was a prominent Georgian ecclesiastic figure, philologist, theologian, historian, and professor of patristics in the interwar period.

After providing help to Jews in Poland, he was arrested and sent to Auschwitz, where he was ultimately killed. He was canonized by the Eastern Orthodox Church as a martyr in 1995 and is celebrated on December 6.

== Life and works ==
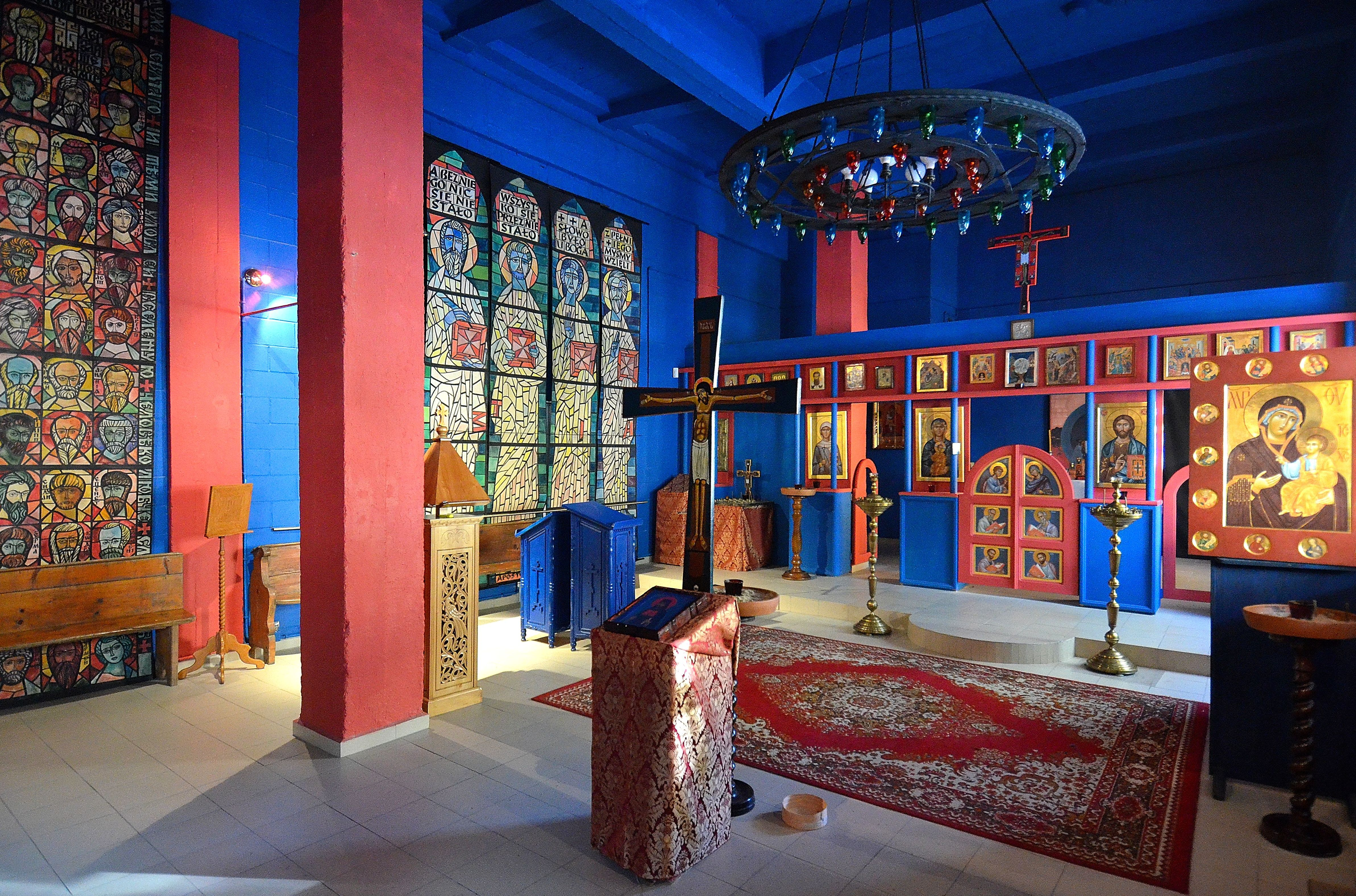
The interior of the Orthodox chapel of St. Grigol Peradze, part of the Warsaw Icon Museum.

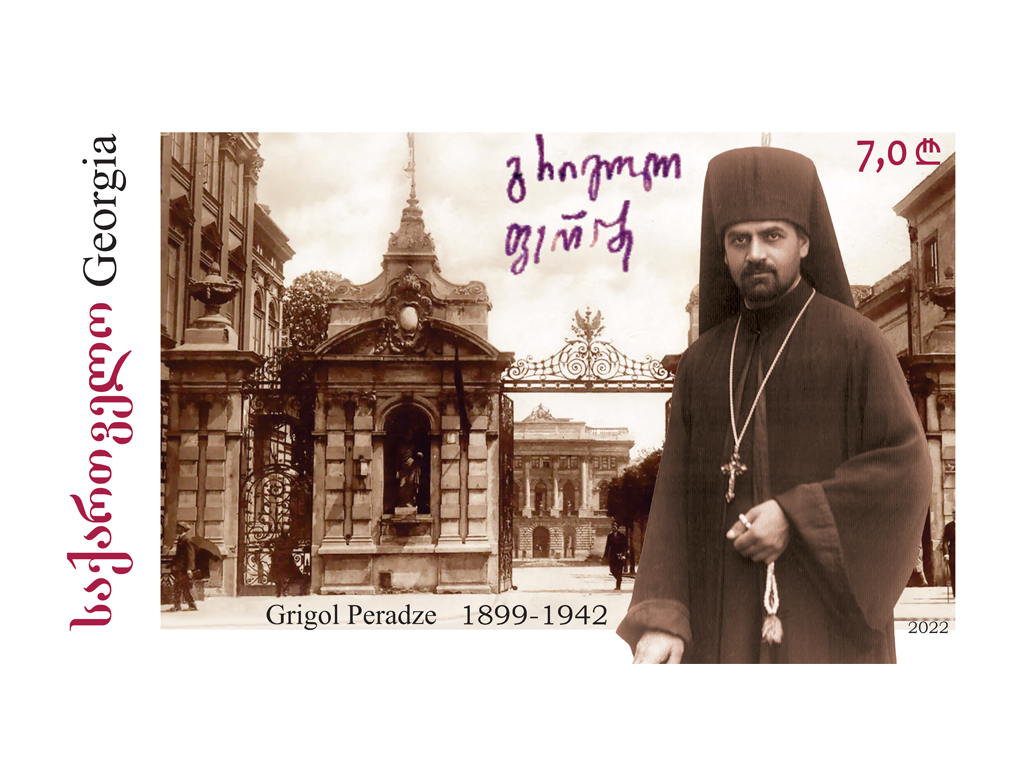
Peradze on a 2022 Georgian stamp.

Grigol Peradze was born in the village of Bakurtsikhe, in what is now the Kakheti region, in Eastern Georgia. The second of three sons of Romanoz Peradze, the local Orthodox priest, and the former Mariam Samadalashvili. Young Grigol was named in honor of the 11th-century Georgian Saint Gregory of Khandzta – Grigol being the cognate of Gregory. His father died when he was six, and the family moved to Tiflis (now Tbilisi), then the provincial capital, and later that of independent Georgia. He attended an Orthodox parochial school, and from 1913 Tbilisi Theological Seminary.

In 1918 Peradze graduated near the top of his class, and afterwards studied at the Tbilisi State University until 1921. In the years 1919–21 he also served in the army. He fought against the Bolsheviks in defense of the Democratic Republic of Georgia. Later, for a short time he was a teacher in a small village near Gori.

On 25 February 1921 Georgia was occupied by Soviet Russia. Grigol Peradze went into exile in Germany in November the same year. However, he would retain the fallen government's passport for the rest of his life. Unlike many who left after the Soviet takeover, Peradze had actually secured legal permission to leave the country through the efforts of one of his former professors. Despite this, he was twice refused permission to return to Georgia in 1921 and 1927. Upon the last rejection he wrote "do not know why. I do not belong to political parties. I have not worked against the Soviet government. My goal was always and is the service of our science and culture." Thus, he became effectively a stateless person, traveling on a Nansen passport. After the annexation of Georgia, he was threatened with imprisonment, so the Georgian Orthodox Church sent Grigoli to the village of Mankhi in Kakheti as a teacher.

In ordinary times Peradze would have studied in Russia; this route was now closed to him, and other talented students; the Church sought to send students to come to Germany. At a local council of the Church held at Gelati in 1921, it was decided to send Peradze to continue further studies abroad. He was encouraged by his mentor, Cornelius Kekelidze, and the head of the Georgian Orthodox Church, Catholicos-Patriarch Ambrose. This was done with the help of German Kartvelologist Arthur Leist and the head of the Oriental mission in Potsdam, Johannes Lepsius, through the German ambassador to Georgia. Grigol was able to study in Berlin and later Bonn. In 1926 he graduated from the University of Bonn (Germany). In December 1927 he received a PhD degree in history (the title of his PhD thesis was History of the Georgian Monasticism from its creation until 1064).

From 1927 to 1932 Peradze was an associate professor at the University of Bonn. From 1933 to 1942 he was a professor of patrology at the Faculty of Orthodox Theology of Warsaw University, in Poland. In the spring of 1927 Peradze spent time researching manuscripts in the British Museum and the Bodleian Library at Oxford.

Around Christmas in 1930 Peradze became seriously ill, and pledged that he would devote himself to God if he recovered. On 18 April 1931 Peradze was tonsured a monk at Holy Wisdom Greek Orthodox Cathedral in London, followed the next day by being named a hierodeacon. Five weeks later, on 24 May, he was ordained a priest at St. Stephen's Greek Orthodox Cathedral in Paris. In 1931 he became the first regular priest of the Georgian St. Nino Orthodox Church in Paris, which had been established by laymen in 1929, where he celebrated his first liturgy on 31 May. In the same year he began to publish a Georgian scientific journal titled Jvari Vazisa ("Grapevine cross"). On 5 January 1934, again at Holy Wisdom, he was raised to the rank of archimandrite in recognition of his pastoral work with the Georgian community.

In the 1930s, Peradze discovered numerous important written manuscripts of Georgian Christian culture in Romania, Bulgaria, Greece, Italy, Germany, and Austria (Georgian manuscripts of the Typicon of the Georgian Petritsoni Monastery (Bachkovo, Bulgaria), the so-called Tischendorf manuscripts of the Apagae of the Monastery of the Holy Cross at the University Library in the University of Leipzig, Germany, etc.). During this time, Peradze lived in a small apartment in Warsaw's Praga District at Brukowa 22 Street (today Okrzei Street), where he kept his large collection of Georgian antiquities.

The invasion of Poland by German troops in 1939 made Peradze's position precarious. For him, being in solidarity with Jews in peril went without saying; and he helped wherever he could. Nor did he hesitate to visit the imprisoned Polish Metropolitan Dionysius. These activities were viewed with growing suspicion by the Nazi occupiers, and Peradze's fruitful ecclesiastic and scientific activities were brought to an end in 1942 when, on 4 May, he was arrested by the Gestapo. On 6 December 1942 Peradze was killed in the Nazi concentration camp of Auschwitz (Oświęcim) when he took the blame for the murder of a German officer to spare his fellow prisoners, or, according to another report, when he entered a gas chamber in the place of a Jewish prisoner who had a large family.

Peradze is commemorated by his memorial chapel in Warsaw, a museum in his hometown, memorial plaques at the University of Warsaw and on St. George's Church, Bakurtsikhe, where he was baptized.

His main fields of scientific activity were the history of the Georgian Orthodox and Apostolic Church, source studies of the history of Georgia and the Georgian Church, patrology, history of Georgian literature, Rustavelology, etc.

Grigol Peradze was canonized by the Georgian Orthodox Church in September 1995. The feast day for St. Grigol is 6 December (or 23 November, Old Style). In 2013, he was posthumously awarded the title and Order of the National Hero of Georgia.

== See also ==
- Simon Mchedlidze

== Works ==
- Die Anfänge des Mönchtums in Georgien.- "Zeitschrift für Kirchengeschichte", 47, Heft 1, Stuttgart, 1928, pp. 34–75 (in German)
- L'activité littéraire des moines géorgiens au monastère d'Iviron au mont Athos.- "Revue d'histoire ecclésiastique", 23, Fasc. 3, Paris, 1927, pp. 530–539 (in French)
- Über das georgische Mönchtum.- "Internationale Kirchliche Zeitschrift", 34, Heft 3, Bern, 1926, pp. 152–168 (in German)
- Die Probleme der ältesten Kirchengeschichte Georgiens.- "Oriens Christianus", 29, Bd. 7, Wiesbaden, 1932, pp. 153–171 (in German)
- Zur vorbyzantinischen Liturgie Georgiens.- "Le Muséon", 42, Fasc. 2, Louvain, 1929, pp. 90–99 (in German)
- Les Monuments liturgiques prébyzantins en langue géorgienne.- "Le Muséon", 45, Fasc. 4, Louvain, 1932, pp. 255–272 (in French)
- The Liturgy of Saint Peter.- "Kyrios", 2, Fasc. 3, 1937, pp. 260–262
- An Account of the Georgian Monks and Monasteries in Palestine as revealed in the Writings of Nongeorgian Pilgrims.- "Georgica", 2, Vol. 4–5, London, 1937, pp. 181–246
- Über die Georgischen Handschriften in Österreich.- "Wiener Zeitschrift für die Kunde des Morgenlandes", 47, Heft 3–4, Wien, 1940, pp. 219–232 (in German)
- Im Dienste der Georgischen Kultur.- "Aus der Welt des Ostens", Königsberg, 1940, pp. 30–50 (in German)
- Irakli Jinjolava: The Ecumenical Vocation of the Orthodox Church According to the Georgian Theologian and Saint Priest-Martyr Grigol Peradze. In: Ostkirchliche Studien 65 (2016) S. 237–270.
- Irakli Jinjolava: A Portrait of Grigol Peradze Against the Background of the Ecumenical Vocation in the Orthodox Church. In: Pro Georgia, 2019, t. 29, s. 287–291.
