= Verbrennungskommando Warschau =

WWII slave labor unit

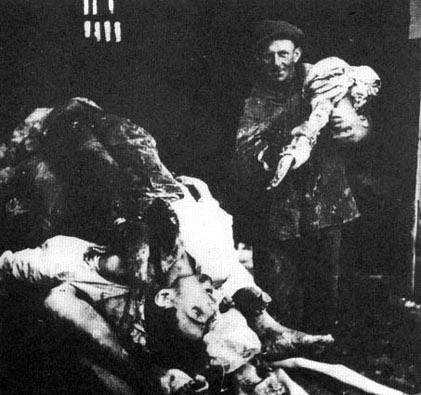
- A Polish prisoner of the Verbrennungskommando disposing of corpses after the Nazi German Wola Massacre in Warsaw, photographed by an unknown German SS officer, 1944
- Date: 1944
- Location: Warsaw, occupied Poland
- Cause: Wola Massacre
- Participants: Wehrmacht, Gestapo, SS, Trawnikis, Sonderdienst
- Casualties: Approximately 40,000–50,000

Verbrennungskommando Warschau (German: Warsaw burning detachment) was a slave labour unit formed by the SS following the Wola massacre of around 40,000 to 50,000 Polish civilians by the Germans in the early days of the Warsaw Uprising of 1944.

The purpose of the Verbrennungskommando was to remove evidence of the citywide campaign of mass murder that took place during the Uprising, by collecting corpses into large piles and burning them in open-air pyres on Elektoralna and Chłodna Streets among others. The squad was directly subordinated to SS-Obersturmführer Neumann and was also earmarked for execution after the completion of their work.

== Background ==
During the Warsaw Uprising, Polish civilians were indiscriminately killed by the Germans and their Ukrainian and Russian collaborators in punitive mass executions, the most notorious of which took place in Wola, Ochota, and Warsaw's Old Town, based on the explicit orders of Heinrich Himmler, who said: "Every inhabitant of Warsaw is to be shot. Prisoners will not be taken; the town is to be razed to the ground."

Most of the atrocities were committed by troops under the command of SS men Oskar Dirlewanger, Heinrich Reinefarth, and Bronislav Kaminski.

Between 8 and 23 August 1944, the Germans organised several dozen captured Poles into a cremation commando which they named Verbrennungskommando. These men were forced to pick through the ruins and collect thousands of the victims' bodies under the strict supervision of German overseers. In the first two weeks the Verbrennungskommando cremated an estimated 6,000 bodies.

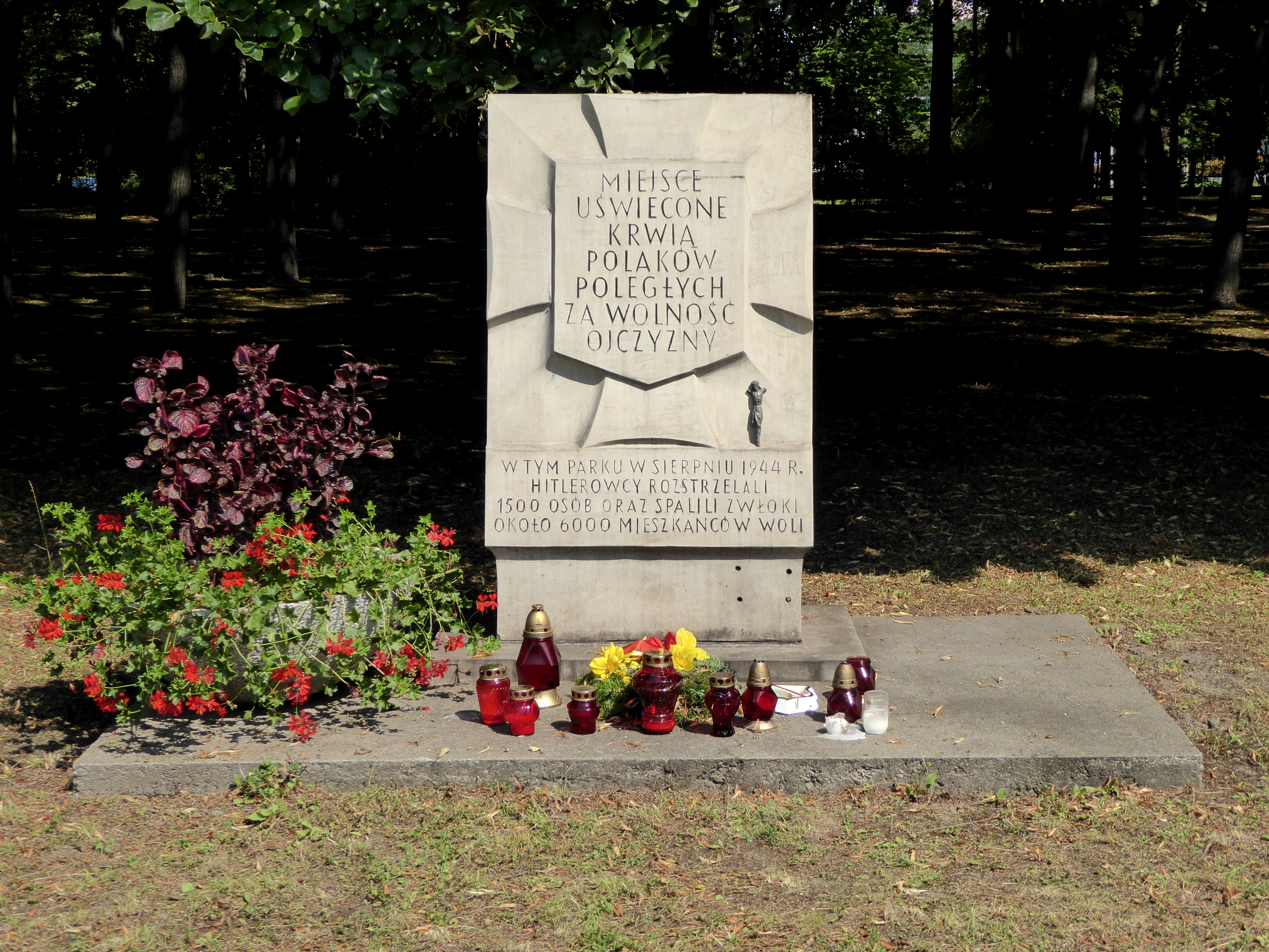
A Tchorek plaque in Sowinski Park commemorating the mass murder of 1500 people by the Germans during the Wola massacre. The bodies of 6000 victims of the massacre were also burned at this location.

Tadeusz Klimaszewski, a prisoner who survived the cremation commando, and later wrote a memoir about the experience called Verbrennungskommando Warschau (published in 1959 in Warsaw), described his first day of corpse disposal at the Franaszek Factory in the following way:

As far as one could see, the courtyard square was filled with the dead bodies. They were lying in the full sun, some piled up in the centre, others strewn next to each other, or propped individually along the edges with hands reaching toward the brick wall as if they had tried to save themselves. They must have been herded there as a large crowd, and had grenades thrown at them, because their bodies were terribly mangled.

The Verbrennungskommando members were not informed about Himmler's true intentions but were promised a return to "normalcy", as soon as the "bandits" were punished. They were told that their "duty" to burn the dead bodies was therefore in their interest. There was one Jewish prisoner among them.

After the war, most of the ashes dumped into bomb holes and ditches by the cremation commando were exhumed in 1947 and buried in Warsaw cemeteries. They included 5,578 kilograms of human remains from Stalina Avenue, 2,180 kilograms from the military prison at Zamenhofa, 1,029 kilograms from 60 Wolska Street, 1,120 kilograms from Sowinski Park, 600 kilograms from 47 Dzielna Street, 600 kilograms from the Franaszek Factory, 192 kilograms from 59 Okopowa Street, and 120 kilograms from "Dobrolin" Wolska Street, among several other locations. The full list of burial sites was then delivered to the Regional Commission for the Investigation of Nazi German Crimes in Poland.

== See also ==
- Warsaw Uprising
- Wola Massacre
- Monument to Victims of the Wola Massacre
- Wola Massacre Memorial on Górczewska Street
- Ochota massacre
- Warsaw Uprising Museum
- Military history of the Warsaw Uprising
- Nazi crimes against ethnic Poles
- Chronicles of Terror
- Sonderkommando

== Notes and references ==
- Zbrodnie okupanta w czasie powstania warszawskiego w 1944 roku (w dokumentach), wydawnictwo MON, Warszawa 1962, pp. 244–260.
- Marek Getter, Straty Ludzkie i materialne w Powstaniu Warszawskim. BIULETYN Instytutu Pamięci Narodowej NR 8-9/2004.
- Tomasz Szarota, Karuzela na placu Krasińskich: studia i szkice z lat wojny i okupacji, ISBN 8373993363, Verlag Rytm, 2007, p. 393.
