= Wola Massacre Memorial, Górczewska Street =

Memorial in Warsaw, Poland

Coordinates: 52.238155°N 20.957079°E

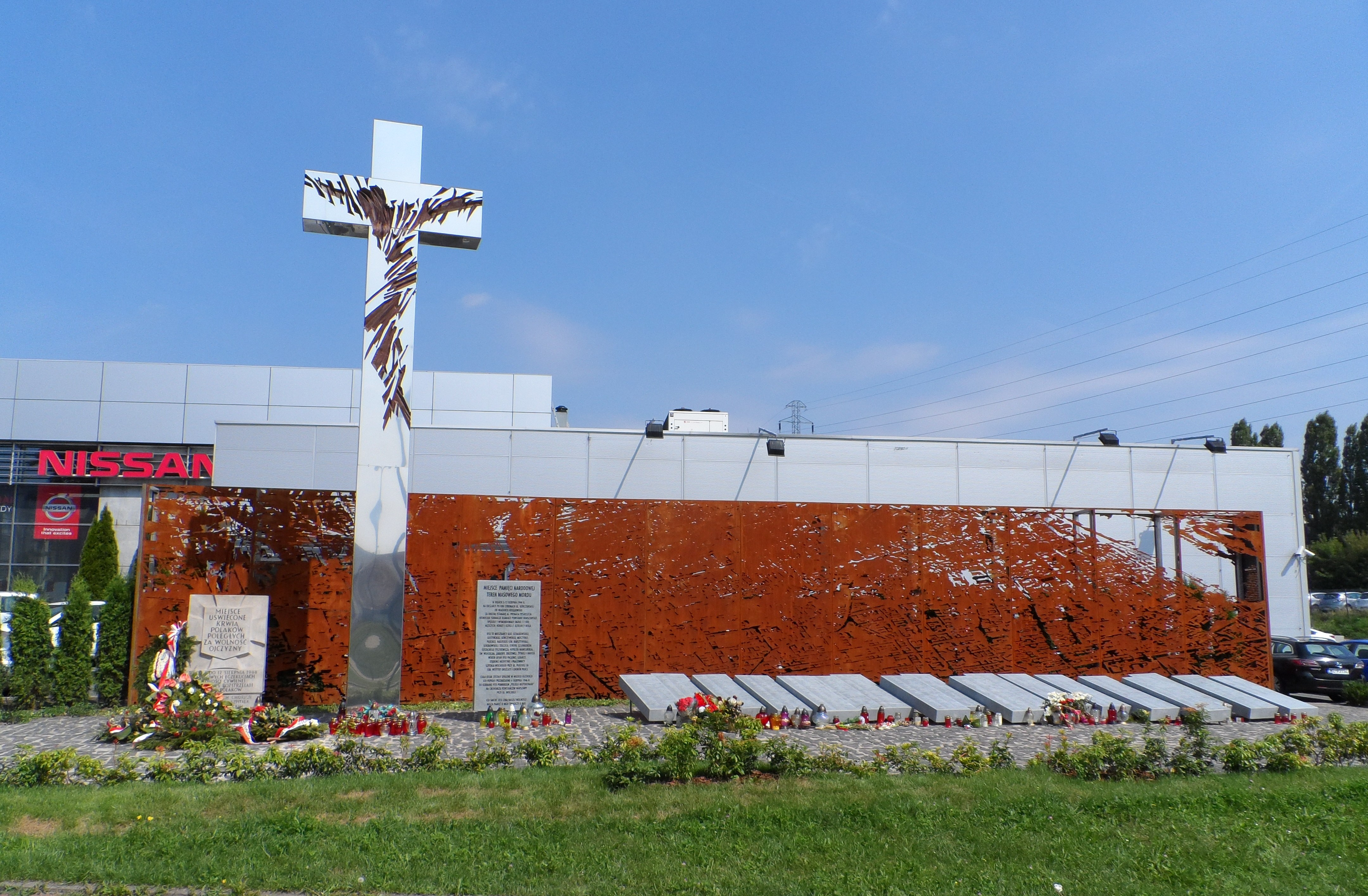
The memorial site at 32 Górczewska Street

The Wola Massacre Memorial on Górczewska Street is a war memorial located at 32 Górczewska Street (near the intersection with Prymasa Tysiąclecia Avenue) in the Wola district of Warsaw, Poland.

A large cross and several memorial plaques commemorate the place which was the principal execution site used by the Nazi German occupiers of Warsaw during the Wola massacre, one of the most brutal massacres of civilians during the Second World War, which took place between 5 and 12 August 1944, in the early days of the Warsaw Uprising. Up to 10,000 Polish men, women and children were murdered at the site.

== History ==
In early August 1944, German troops sent to suppress the Warsaw Uprising massacred 40,000–50,000 inhabitants of the district of Wola, mainly in organised mass executions. On the express orders of Adolf Hitler, people were murdered regardless of their age or sex. The greatest number of killings took place in the area near Górczewska and Moczydła streets, in particular at a building on Górczewska Street located near a railway embankment. The mass executions at this site began on 4 August and continued until 8 August 1944. The greatest number of victims were killed on 5 August (known as "Black Saturday").

Historians estimate that up to 10,000 Polish people - men, women and children - were executed near the location of the memorial. After rounding up and killing the victims, the Germans burned the bodies, which made a precise determination of the number of people murdered here impossible. It is known, however, that among the victims were residents of the following streets: Działdowska, Gostyńska, Górczewska, Moczydło, Płocka, Rabsztyńska, Skierniewicka, Sokołowska, Staszica, Syreny, Szlenkierów, św. Wojciecha, Tyszkiewicza, Wawelberga, Zbożowa and Żytnia. The Germans also murdered around 360 patients from Wola Hospital on Płocka Street (now the Institute of Tuberculosis and Lung Diseases) and three priests from Saint Wojciech's Church (Kościół Świętego Wojciecha) on Wolska Street.

== Commemoration ==
By the first anniversary of the massacre, a wooden cross had been placed at the site of the murders and a commemoration took place at the initiative of employees of Wola Hospital, who still care for the memorial to this day. In the early 1950s, a Tchorek plaque was added to the memorial.

== Controversy ==
In 2004, a Nissan car showroom was built in the area behind the memorial and there was a proposal to transfer the cross to the nearby railway embankment. This idea met with protests, especially from survivors of the Warsaw Uprising, who argued that its implementation would be insulting to the victims. As a result, the memorial was left intact, and the Council for the Protection of Struggle and Martyrdom Sites and the authorities of the City of Warsaw also decided to renovate it.

== The current state of the memorial ==
In 2010, the memorial was supplemented by another plaque, containing a more a detailed description of the crimes carried out at the site. In addition, the Council for the Protection of Struggle and Martyrdom Sites ordered and funded a new 8-metre-high (26 ft) steel cross, which replaced the old wooden cross. The image of Christ - visible on the metal casing of the cross - was composed in the form of an annealed trace. The bottom section of the cross is also blackened, to symbolise the burning of the corpses of the victims by the so-called Verbrennungskommando. The renovated memorial was officially unveiled on 5 August 2012, the 68th anniversary of the Wola massacre.

Further renovation work was carried out in July 2014, followed by another unveiling on 5 August 2014, the 70th anniversary of the massacre.

== Gallery ==
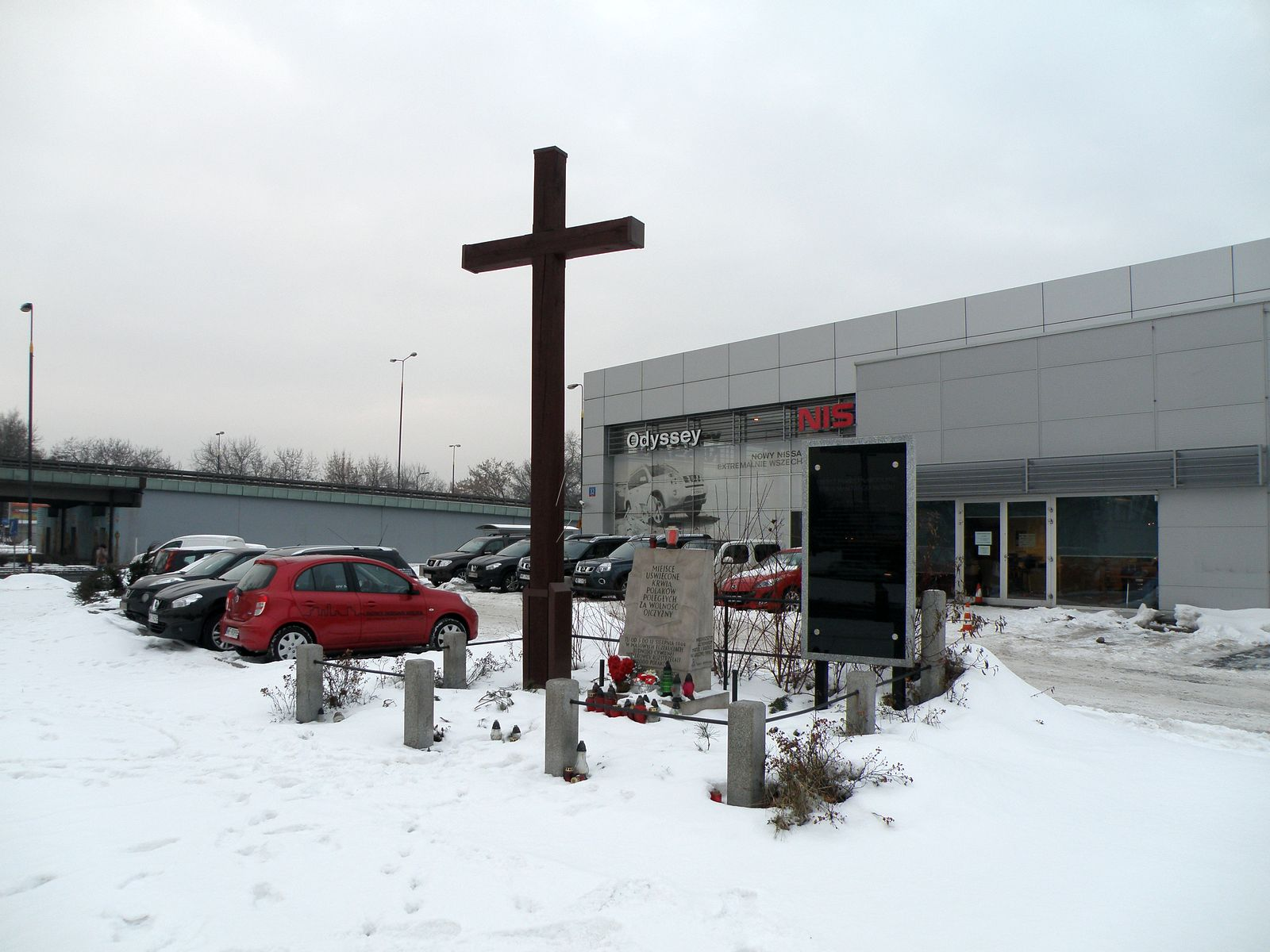
The memorial in 2010 (showing the old wooden cross)

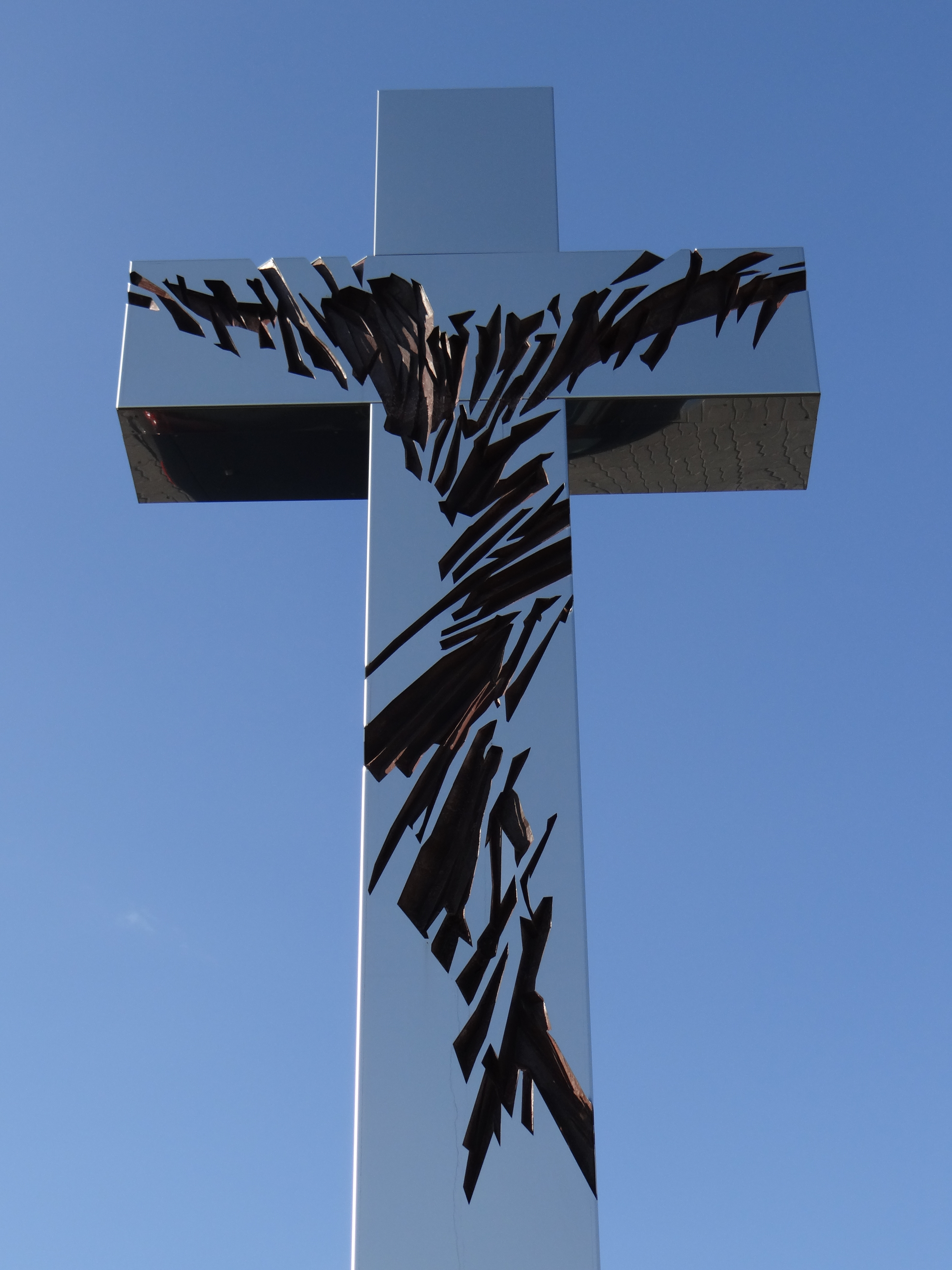
The new steel cross

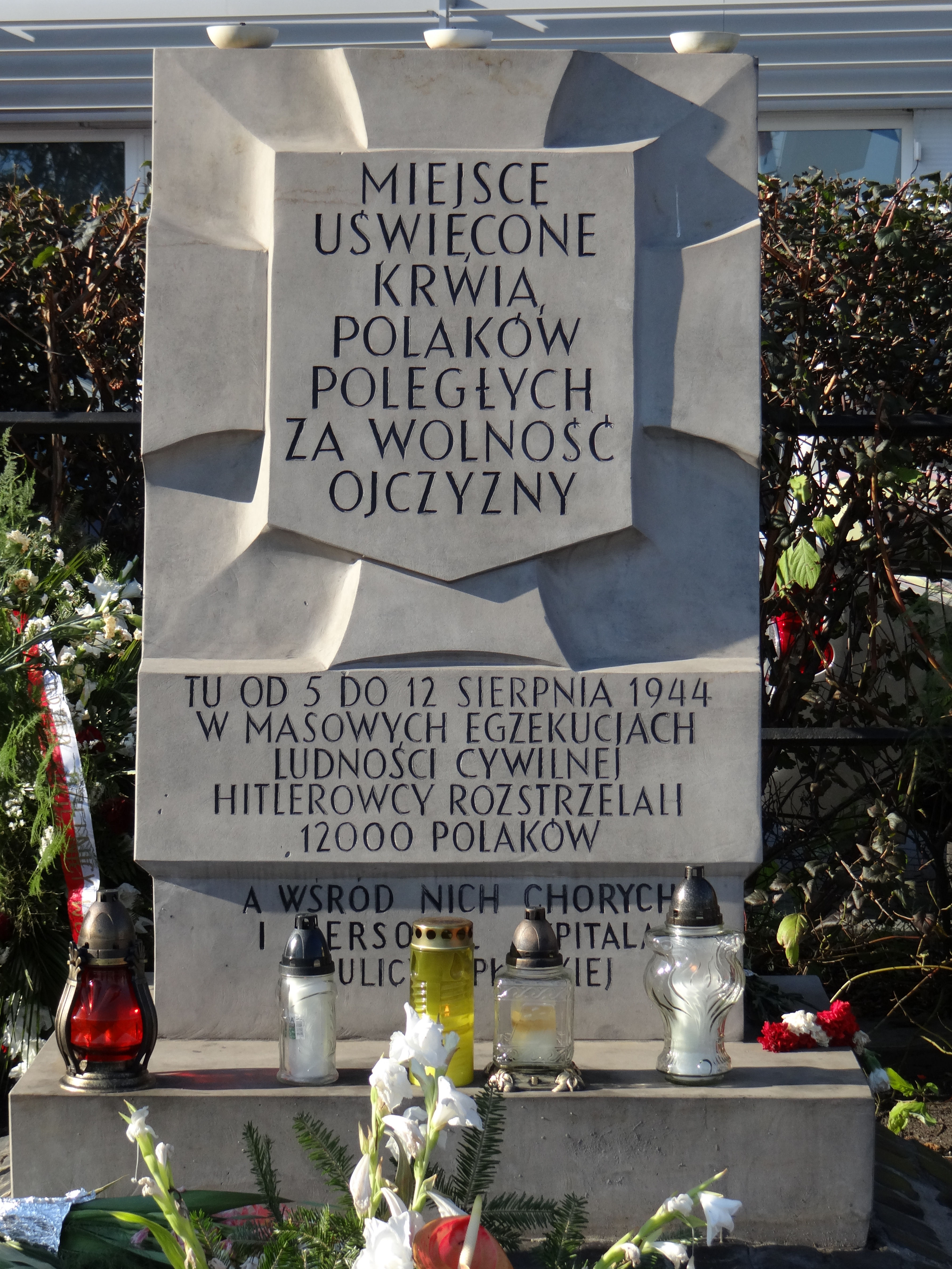
The Tchorek plaque dating from the 1950s

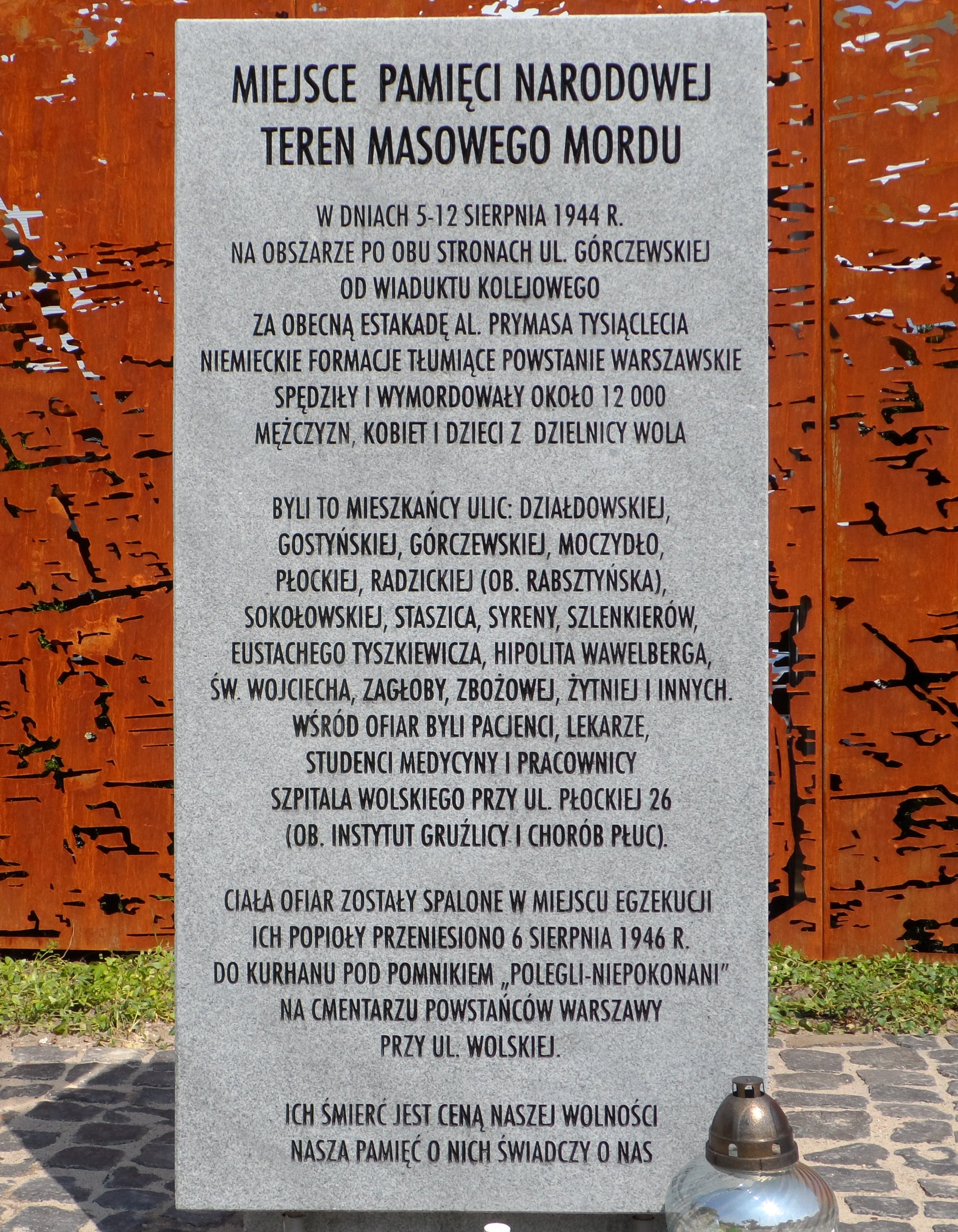
The memorial plaque that was added to the memorial in 2010

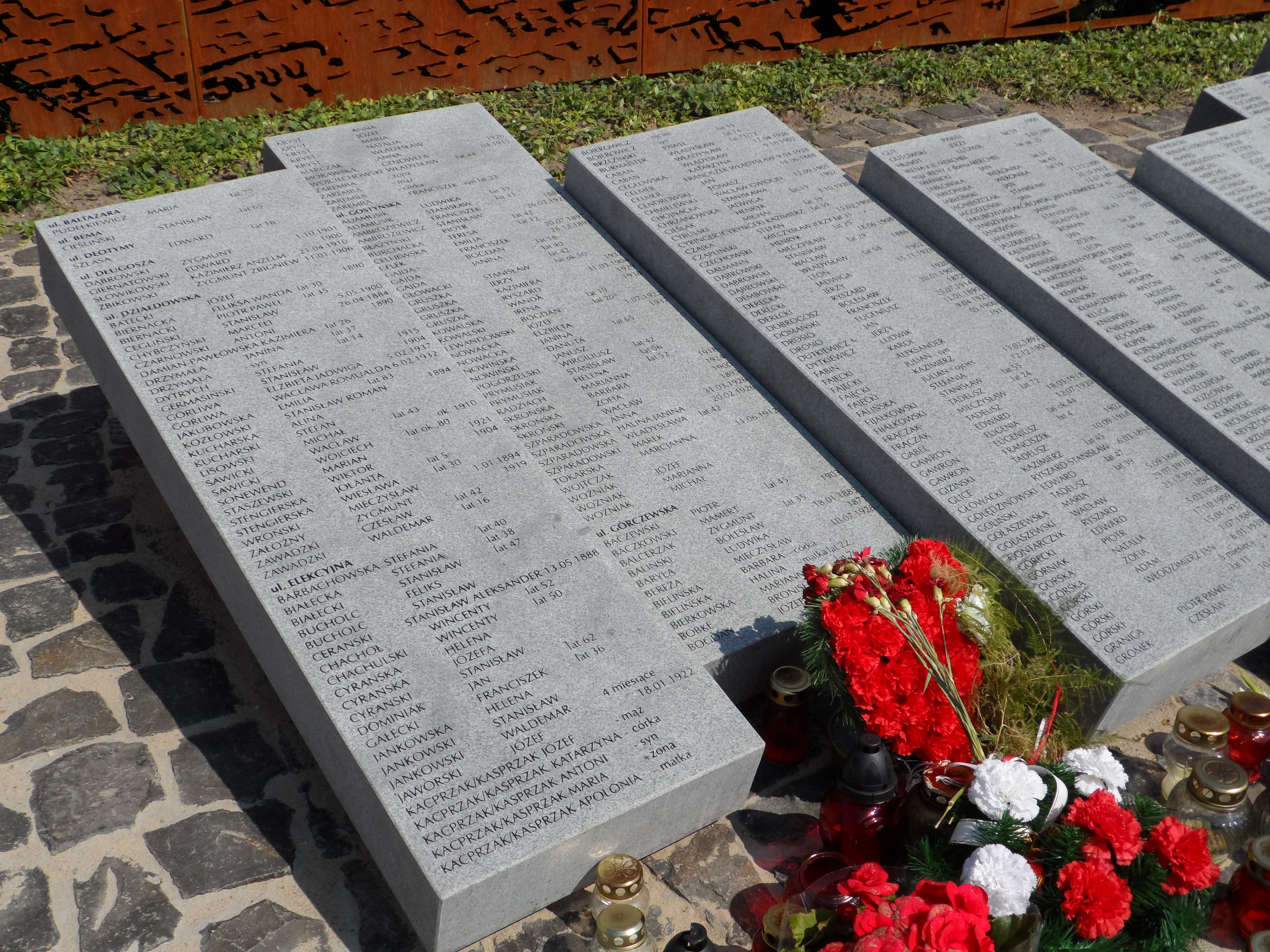
Plaques containing the names of identified victims of the massacre

== See also ==
- Warsaw Uprising
- Wola massacre
- Verbrennungskommando Warschau
- Monument to Victims of the Wola Massacre
- Ochota massacre
- Warsaw Uprising Museum

== Bibliography ==
- Maja Motyl, Stanisław Rutkowski, Powstanie Warszawskie – rejestr miejsc i faktów zbrodni (Warsaw Uprising - a register of places and facts of the crime), GKBZpNP-IPN, Warszawa 1994 (in Polish).
