= Rakowiec =

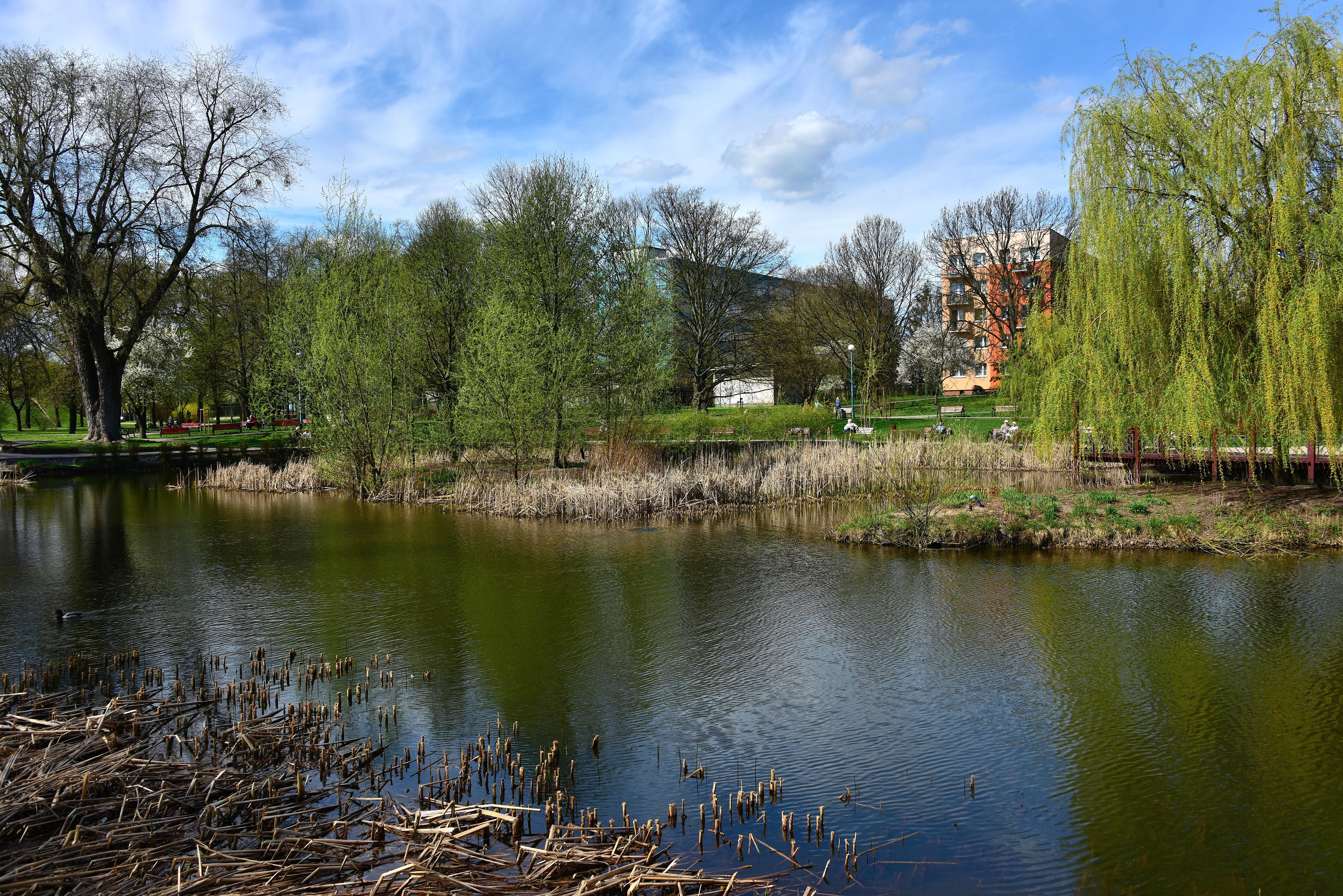
- Zasław Malicki Park

- Location of Rakowiec within Ochota
- Coordinates: 52°12′09″N 20°58′41″E
- Country: Poland
- Voivodeship: Masovian
- County/City: Warsaw
- District: Ochota
- Time zone: UTC+1 (CET)
  - Summer (DST): UTC+2 (CEST)

Rakowiec is a neighbourhood in Warsaw, the capital of Poland. Part of the borough of Ochota, it is located in the west-central part of the city.

== History ==
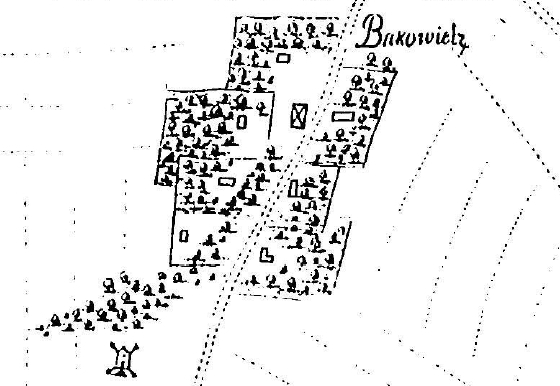
The village of Rakowiec on a 1705 map

It originally was a separate village, established in the Middle Ages. Nationalised by the Russian authorities in the late 19th century, the village was occupied by one of the forts of the Warsaw Fortress. After Poland regained her independence, in 1930 the area was incorporated into Warsaw, and residential areas were soon built there.
