= Ilia Jinjolava =

Georgian Theologian

- ილია ჯინჯოლავა
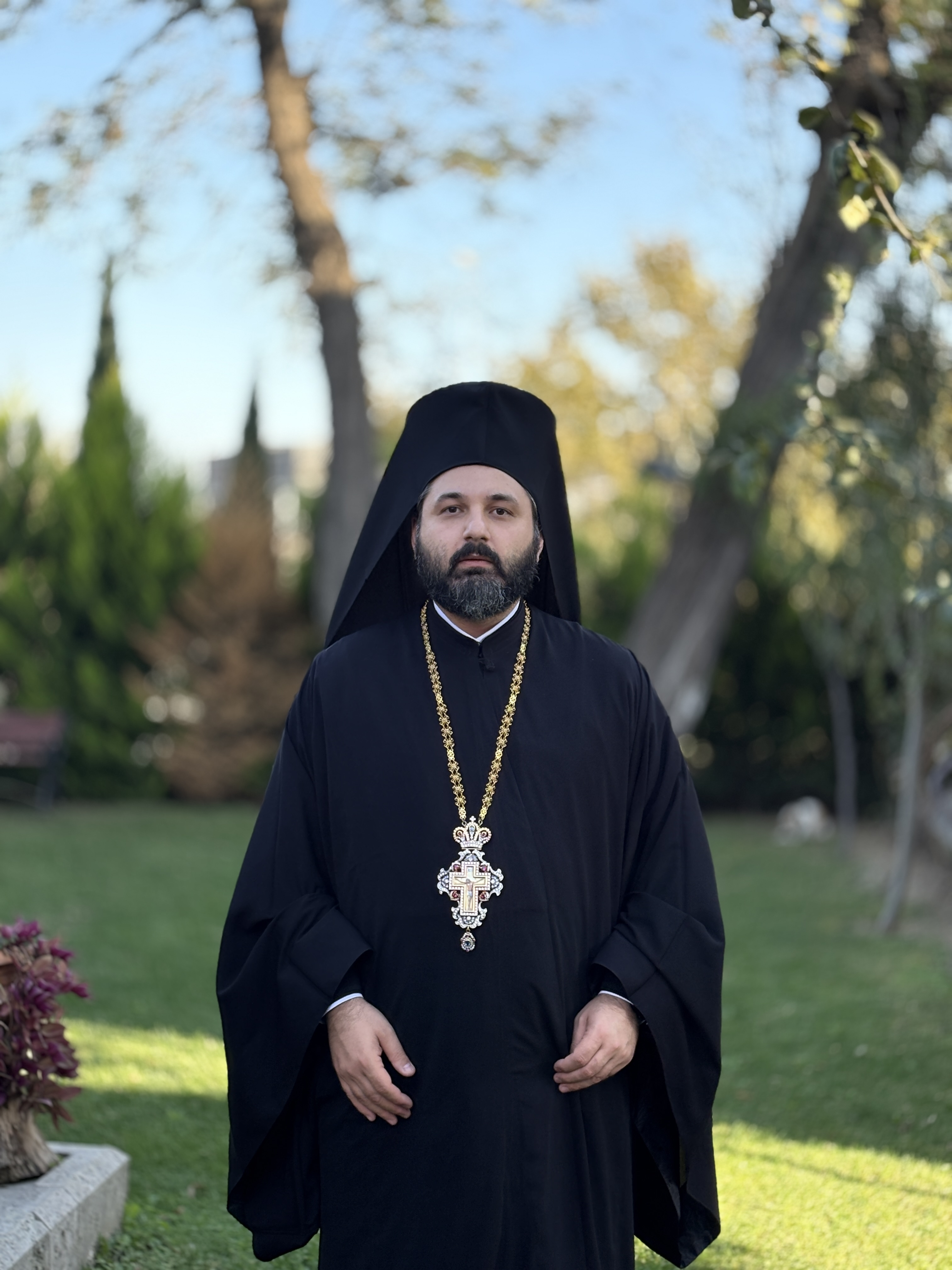
- Born: Irakli Jinjolava; Zugdidi, Georgia
- Education: LMU Munich, Aristotle University of Thessaloniki, University of Geneva
- Alma mater: Tbilisi Theological Seminry
- Occupations: Theologian, cleric, blogger
- Title: Doctor of Theology, Archimandrite of the Ecumenical Throne

Ilia Jinjolava (born as Irakli Jinjolava, Georgian: ირაკლი ჯინჯოლავა) is a Georgian theologian and Orthodox presbyter.

== Biography ==
llia Jinjolava completed his undergraduate studies in 2011 at Tbilisi Theological Seminary in Georgia. He continued studying theology in Germany at the Catholic University of Eichstätt-Ingolstadt and LMU Munich and later at the Aristotle University of Thessaloniki in Greece. He received his MAS in Ecumenical Studies from the Bossey Ecumenical Institute in 2016 and was tonsured a monk in 2017. He is currently a doctoral candidate at the Institute of Orthodox Theology at LMU Munich. Since 2017, he has been a research assistant at the Institute of Orthodox Theology and has served as a deacon in the Orthodox Church of Georgia since 2018. On July 12, 2020, he was ordained to the Holy Priesthood by His All-Holiness, Ecumenical Patriarch Bartholomew, given the name Ilia and has been appointed as a spiritual father of the Georgian Orthodox community living in Turkey. The Ecumenical Patriarch bestowed the offikion of Archimandrite of the Ecumenical Throne upon Fr. Jinjolava, who is in charge of the church and the Georgian community in Constantinople.

llia Jinjolava is a member of several international organizations, including Society of Biblical Literature, European Association on Biblical Studies, Orthodox Center for the Advancement of Biblical Studies Society for the Study of Scripture and others. Jinjolava has participated in many international conferences and symposia. In 2016, he actively participated in the preparation of Georgian-language articles and news of the Holy and Great Council of the Orthodox Church, and also established the website. He has published several academic articles, writes blogs and is engaged in translation activities.

In 2020, he spent several weeks in the United States to conduct research, visited two major orthodox theological institutions (St Vladimir's Orthodox Theological Seminary and Hellenic College Holy Cross Greek Orthodox School of Theology), and to develop his thesis and collected the required bibliography. He completed his doctoral studies in Biblical theology, specifically - New Testament at the Institute of Orthodox Theology of LMU Munich in 2022.

== Publications ==
=== Book ===
- Die Charismen in der paulinischen Ekklesiologie (1 Kor 12–14), Edition Logos, 2023 (ISBN 978-3-96321-155-3)

=== Articles ===
- Ilia Jinjolava, სამსჯავრო სიყვარულის ენით: ქრისტიანული განსჯის თეოლოგიური ანალიზი (Judging in the Language of Love: A Theological Analysis of Christian Judgment), in: ზღვარი / The theological journal Zghvari (Verge), N6(16)2025, pp.37-44. In the digital library "Iveriel" of the National Library of Georgia
- Ilia Jinjolava, მოქალაქეობა და ერთობა – მღვდელმოწამე გრიგოლ ფერაძე (Citizenship and Unity – Saint Hieromartyr Grigol Peradze), in: ზღვარი / The theological journal Zghvari (Verge), N2(12) 2024, pp.57-63. In the digital library "Iveriel" of the National Library of Georgia
- Irakli Jinjolava, მღვდელმოწამე გრიგოლ ფერაძე – მოქალაქეობა და ერთობა [Saint Hieromartyr Grigol Peradze the Citizenship and the Unity], in: Saint Grigol Peradze 120, 1st INternational Conference of Saint Grigol Peradze, Georgian and Christian Civilization (Publish House 'Universali', Tbilisi 2020), 11–15.
- Irakli Jinjolava, „Synodical Principle as the Key to Church Unity“, in: Stolen Churches or Bridges to Orthodoxy? Historical and Theological Impulses for the Dialogue Between Orthodox and Eastern Catholic Churches, edited by Vladimir Latinovic and Anastacia Wooden, Palgrave Macmillan, 2020, 301–315.
- Irakli Jinjolava, „წმინდა წერილის კითხვა და ქადაგება“ [The Reading and the Preaching of the Holy Gospel], სამღვდელო ერი: საკითხები სამრევლოს ლიტურგიული ცხოვრებისათვი [The Priestly Nation: The Issues in the Liturgical Life of a Parish], რედ. მღვდელ-მონაზონი ლეონიდე ბ. ებრალიძე ed. L.B. Ebralidze, EECh 1, Tbilisi 2020, 106–121.
- Irakli Jinjolava, „ზოგიერთი ფილოსოფიური და თეოლოგიური საკითხისთვის არეოპაგიტულ ნააზრევში“, ჟურნ. ფილოსოფიურ-თეოლოგიური მიმომხილველი (ივანე ჯავახიშვილის სახელობის თბილისის სახელმწიფო უნივერსიტეტი, ჰუმანიტარულ მევნიერებათა ფაკულტეტი), #9, თბ. 2019, გვ. 51–55. (["Certain Philosophical and Theological Issues Within the Areopagitian Thinking"], in: Philosophical-Theological Review, no. 9 (Ivane Javakhishvili Tbilisi State University, Faculty of Humanities, Educational-Scientific Institute of Philosophy, 2019), 51–55.
- Irakli Jinjolava, „A Portrait of Grigol Peradze Against the Background of the Ecumenical Vocation in the Orthodox Church“, in: Pro Georgia (Journal of Kartvelological Studies, University of Warsaw,), 2019, t. 29, 287–291.
- Irakli Jinjolava, "The Ecumenical Vocation of the Orthodox Church According to the Georgian Theologian and Saint Priest-Martyr Grigol Peradze", in: Ostkirchliche Studien (Ostkirchliches Institut an der Universität Würzburg), Bd. 65, Heft 2 (2016), 239–270.

=== Essays ===
- Ilia Jinjolava, Contemporary Challenges Facing the Orthodox Church or the Threat of a New Schism?, Public Orthodoxy
- Ilia Jinjolava, აღდგომის ესქატოლოგოური განზომილება (The Eschatological Dimension of Easter), in: The theological journal Zghvari (Verge), N5(15)2025, pp.5-6. In the digital library "Iveriel" of the National Library of Georgia
- Irakli Jinjolava, პანდემია და სოლიდარობის იდეა - რას ფიქრობენ სასულიერო პირები (The pandemic and the idea of solidarity - what the clergy think), Emc.org.ge
- Irakli Jinjolava, პანდემია და ეკლესია (Pandemic and Church), Emc.org.ge
- Irakli Jinjolava, Understanding True Citizenship: Lessons from a Georgian Saint, Public Orthodoxy
- Irakli Jinjolava, საქართველოს ეკლესიას აქვს შანსი გახდეს ერთობის შემამტკიცებელი (The Church of Georgia has a chance to become the unifier of the unity), Netgazeti.ge
- Irakli Jinjolava, რა მოხდა უკრაინის გამაერთიანებელ კრებაზე? (What happened at the Unification Council of the Orthodox Churches of Ukraine?), Tabula.ge
- Irakli Jinjolava, კრეტის კრებიდან უკრაინის ავტოკეფალიამდე: რა იქნება ხვალ? (From the Council of Crete to the Autocephaly of Ukraine: What will be tomorrow?), Netgazeti.ge
- Irakli Jinjolava, უკრაინის ავტოკეფალიის მაკურნებელი ხასიათი (The Curing Character of the Ukrainian Autocephaly), Tabula.ge
- Irakli Jinjolava, დაუჭერს მხარს საქართველოს ეკლესია უკრაინის ავტოკეფალიას? (Will Church of Georgia Support Ukrainian Autocephaly?), Tabula.ge

=== Translations ===
- იოანე ქრისავგისი, თეოლოგობა XXI საუკუნეში: მიტროპოლიტ იოანე ზიზიულასის მემკვიდრეობის შესახებ (John Chryssavgis, DOING THEOLOGY IN THE TWENTY-FIRST CENTURY: Reflections on the Legacy of John Zizioulas) (ავტორთან შეთანსმებით და მისი ნებართვით სტატია მცირედით შემოკლდა; ინგლისურიდან თარგმნა ილია ჯინჯოლავამ), in: ზღვარი (N5(15)2025), pp. 36–43.
- Konstitutionelle Vereinbarung zwischen dem Staat Georgien und der Apostolischen Autokephalen Orthodoxen Kirche von Georgien (from Georgian into German translated by Archimandrite Ilia (Irakli) Jinjolava, Constantinopl), in: Orthodoxes Forum 36 (2022/1-2), pp. 90–95.
- Verwaltungsbestimmung (Statut) der Autokephalen Orthodoxen Kirche Georgiens (from Georgian into German translated by Irakli Jinjolava), in: Orthodoxes Forum 33 (1-2/2019)
- კირილ გობორუნი, „რატომ არ არის ეს სქიზმა?“ / Archimandrite Cyrill Govorun, Why this is not a schism?
- მთავარეპისკოპოსი იობ გეჩა, „კრებისკენ“ / Archbishop Job Getcha, “Towards the Council”
- გიორგი ე. დემაკოპულოსი, „მართლმადიდებელი ფუნდამენტალიზმი“ / George E. Demacopoulos, „Orthodox Fundamentalism“
- პაულ ლადუსირი, „ეკუმენიზმმებრძოლეობის შესახებ: ანტიეკუმენიზმი მართლმადიდებლურთეოლოგიაში. ვინ არის ერეტიკოსი?“ / Paul Ladouceur, “On Ecumenoclasm: Anti-Ecumenism in Orthodox Theology. Who Is a Heretic?”

=== Interviews and speeches ===
- Rev. Hierodeacon Irakli Jinjolava on The Synodical Principle as the Key to Church Unity at the Inaugural Conference of the International Orthodox Theological Association (IOTA), with the theme Pan-Orthodox Unity and Conciliarity, held January 9 to 12, 2019, in Iasi, Romania. (Video and Audio)
- TV-Show at the TV-Georgian Channel: "Visit with Fr. Guram" Guest: Irakli Jinjolava, Theme: Dialogue with the doctoral student of theology (Video)
- Radio Interview on the RadioBeo: "Über Georgien bzw. über der Kirche Georgiens" (Audio)
- Radio Interview - BeO-Kirchenfenster: Orthodoxe Weihnacht (Audio)
- Patriarchate TV: "Kviriake - Georgians for Georgia: Irakli Jinjolava" (Video)

== Sources ==
- LMU Munich and Irakli Jinjolava
- Interview with Irakli Jinjolava
- Irakli Jinjolava - ipress.ge
- „New Education“ - Gast: Irakli Jinjolava
- „Gast by Fr Guram“ – Issue: Discussion with Theologian Irakli Jinjolava (06.02.2016)
- Archimandrit Ilia Jinjolava (05.07.2023)
