= Ochota =

District in Warsaw, Poland

- Warsaw District
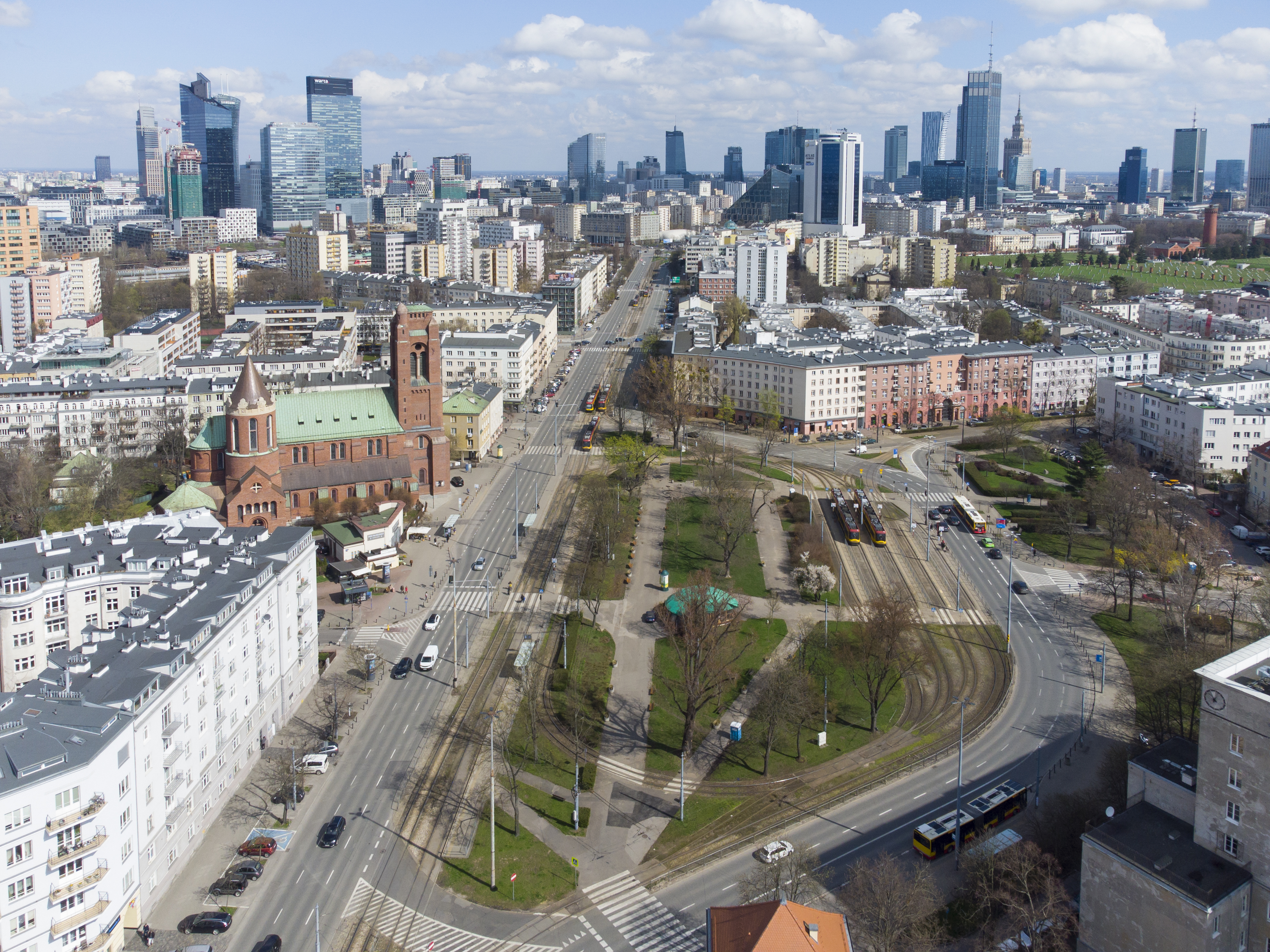
- Panorama of Ochota and Narutowicz Square

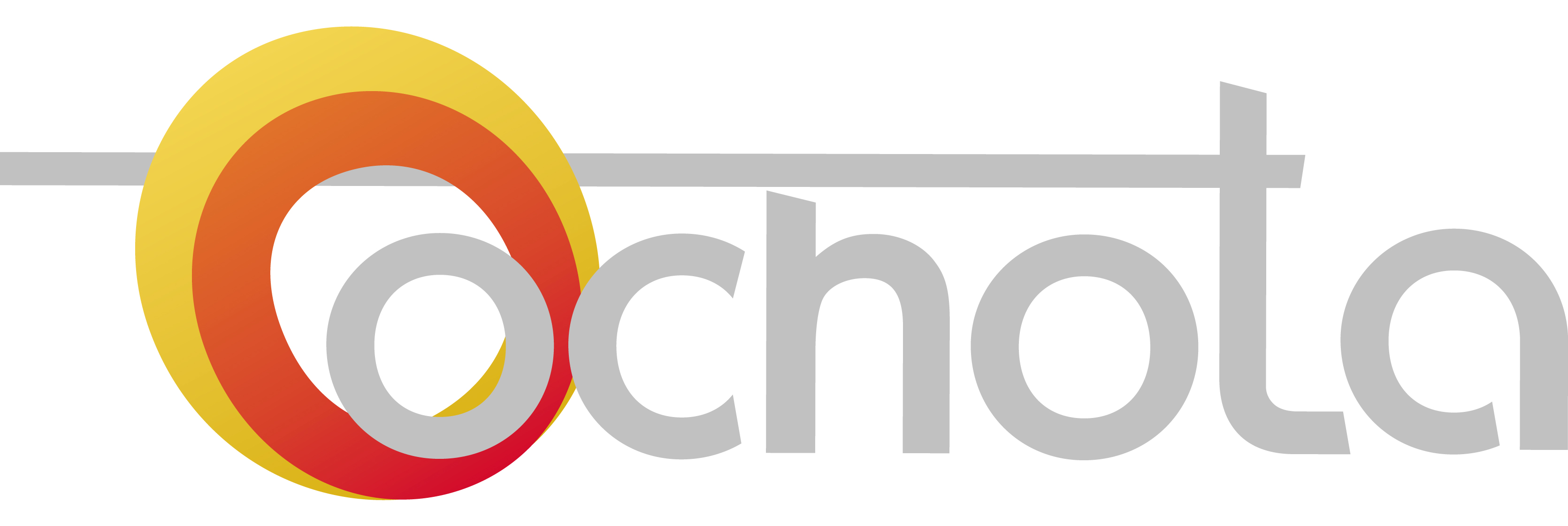
- Brandmark

- Location of Ochota within Warsaw
- Coordinates: 52°12′59″N 20°58′52″E
- Country: Poland
- Voivodeship: Masovian
- County/City: Warsaw

Government
  - Mayor: Piotr Krasnodębski

Area
  - Total: 9.72 km^{2} (3.75 sq mi)

Population (2019)
  - Total: 82,774
  - Density: 8,520/km^{2} (22,100/sq mi)
- Time zone: UTC+1 (CET)
  - Summer (DST): UTC+2 (CEST)
- Area code: +48 22
- Website: ochota.um.warszawa.pl

Ochota (Polish pronunciation: [ɔˈxɔta]) is a district of Warsaw, Poland, located in the central part of the city's urban agglomeration. It is Warsaw's most densely populated district and home to the scientific campus of the University of Warsaw.

The biggest housing estates of Ochota are:

- Kolonia Lubeckiego
- Kolonia Staszica
- Filtry
- Rakowiec
- Szosa Krakowska
- Szczęśliwice
- Osiedle Oaza

== Neighbourhoods within the district ==
- Stara Ochota
- Filtry
- Rakowiec
- Szczęśliwice

== See also ==
- Defense of Ochota and Wola (1939)
- Ochota massacre
- Warsaw Icon Museum
