= Warsaw Icon Museum =

Museum in Warsaw, Poland

Coordinates: 52°12′59.9″N 20°58′30.6″E

- Muzeum Ikon w Warszawie
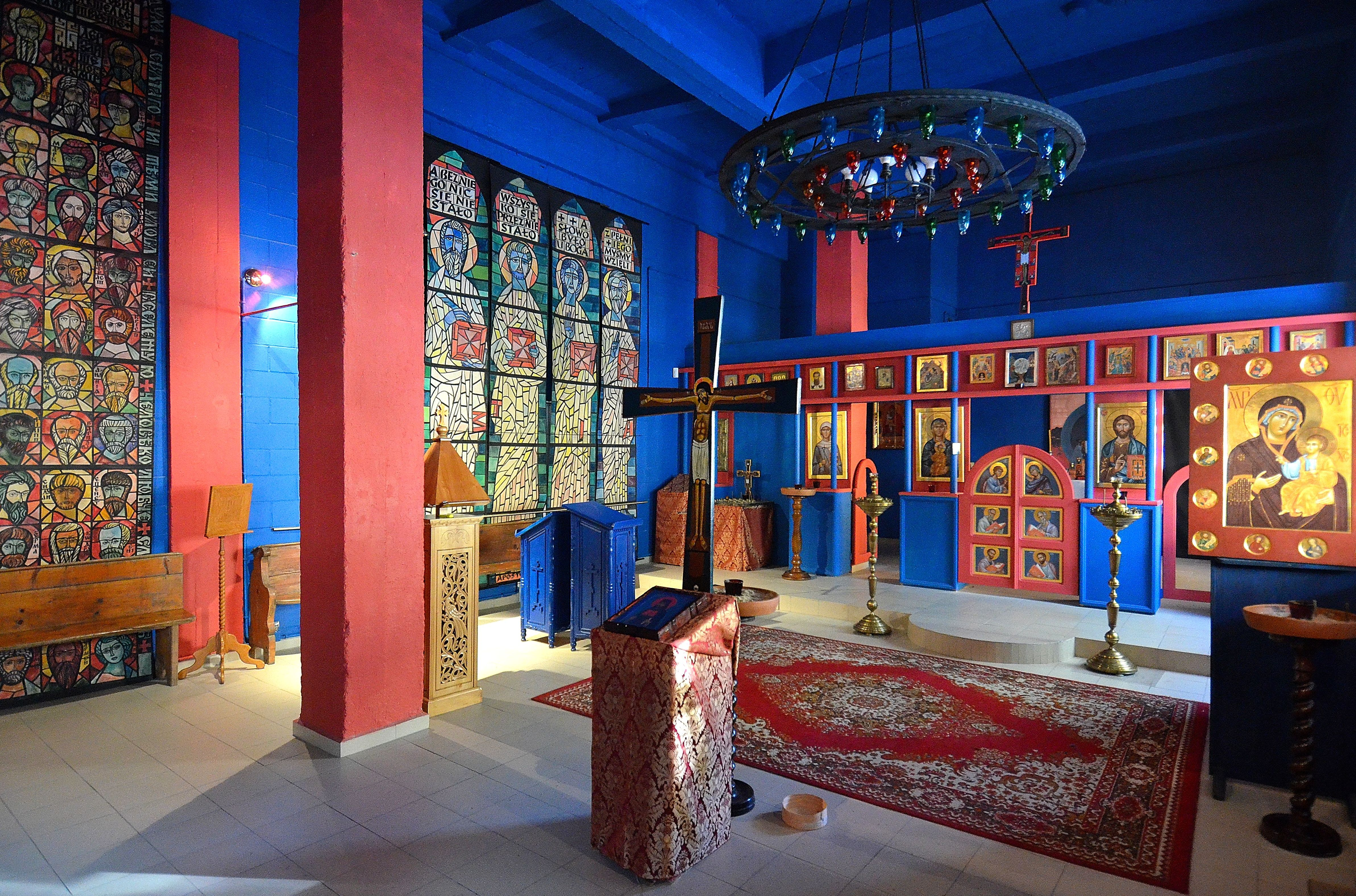
- Chapel of St. Gregory Peradze
- Established: November 29, 2011
- Location: Ochota, Warsaw, Poland
- Director: Michał Bogucki
- Website: Official website

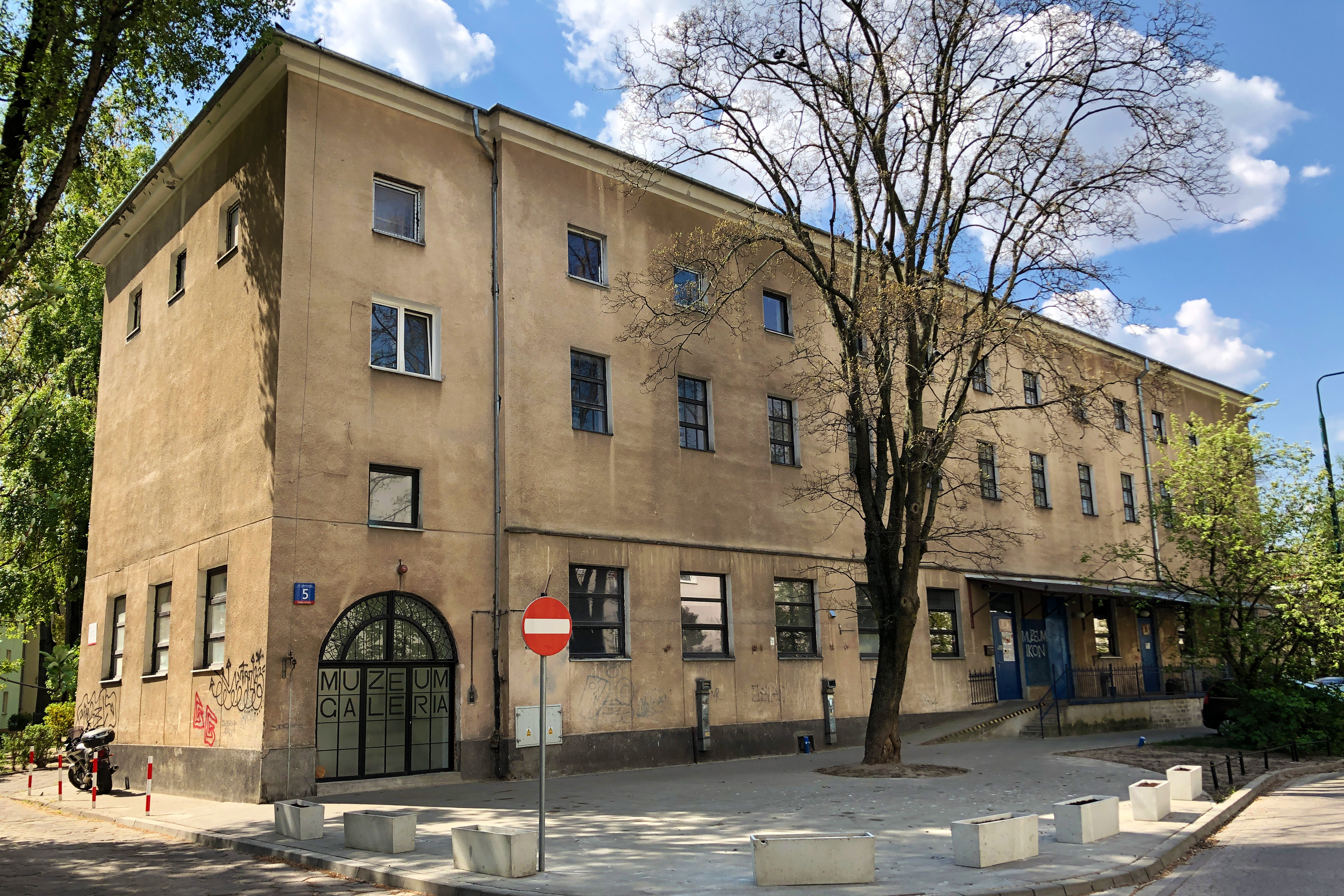
Warsaw Icon Museum, 2020

The Warsaw Icon Museum (Polish: Muzeum Ikon w Warszawie) is the first museum in Warsaw and the third in Poland dedicated to icons. Located in the Ochota district of Warsaw, Poland, the museum is housed in a former boilerhouse.

== See also ==
- Polish Orthodox Church
- Jerzy Nowosielski
- Byzantine art
- Religious image
