= Wanda Lurie =

Wanda Felicja Lurie née Podwysocka (May 23, 1911-May 21, 1989 in Warsaw) was a health care worker, teacher and charity activist. She was both a witness and victim of the Wola massacre in Warsaw, called the Polish Niobe.

== Biography ==
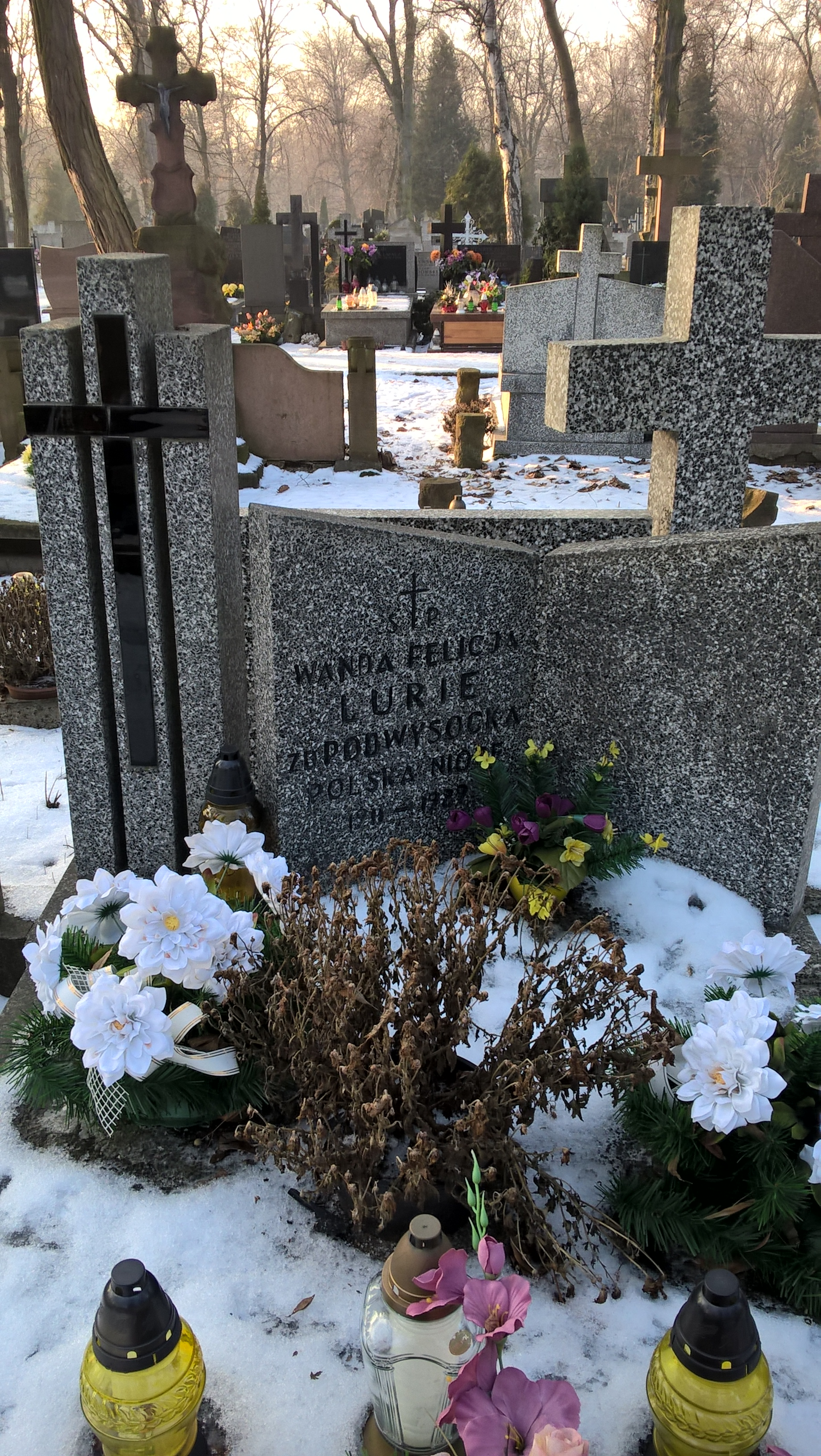
Tomb of Wanda Lurie at Bródnowski Cemetery in Warszaw (sq. 23A, row 3, grave 26)

She was the wife of industrialist Bolesław Lurie and lived with her family in Warsaw's Wola district, in the Wawelberg Colony. On August 5, 1944, being eight months pregnant, she was herded with her three children and hundreds of residents of nearby houses to the „Ursus” factory at 55 Wolska Street. There, the Germans and their eastern collaborators committed a mass crime of genocide, among the dead were also Wanda Lurie's three small children. She herself, severely wounded in the face and legs, lay for two days under a pile of dead people. After getting out onto the street, she was captured again and herded to the Church of St. Stanislaus the Bishop, where a transit camp was located. From there, she was transported to the camp in Pruszków. On August 20, 1944 she gave birth to her son Mścisław, who survived the war and died on June 22, 2018.

After the end of the war, she testified as a witness before the District Commission for the Investigation of German Crimes in Warsaw. She is buried at the Bródnowski Cemetery.

== Commemoration ==
- In April 2005, the square located in the area of Działdowska and Wawelberga streets in Wola was named after Wanda Lurie.
