= Monument to Victims of the Wola Massacre =

- Pomnik ofiar Rzezi Woli
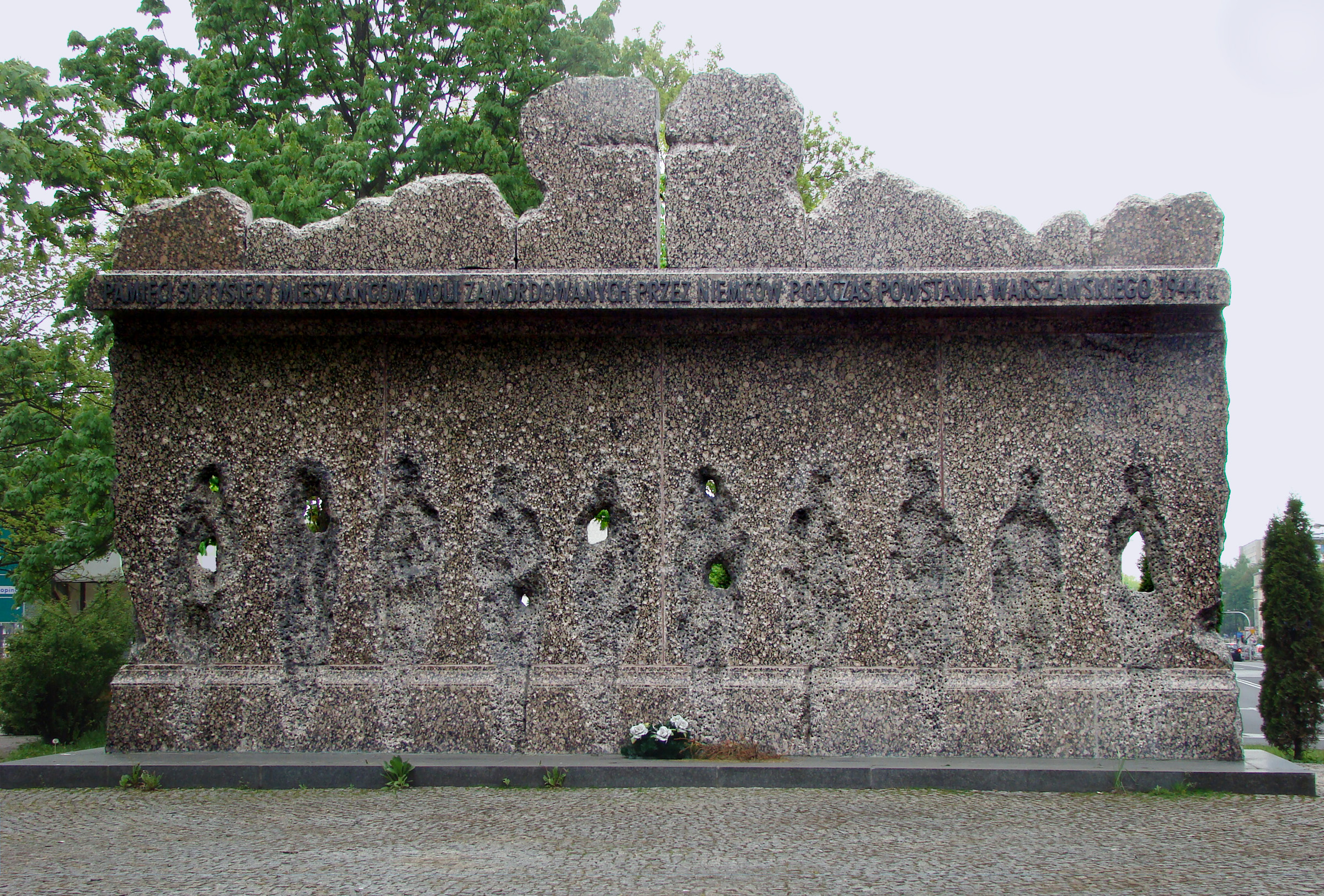
- The eastern side of the monument
- Interactive map of Monument to Victims of the Wola Massacre
- Location: Warsaw
- Coordinates: 52°14′19.30″N 20°59′00.65″E
- Designer: Ryszard Stryjecki (in collaboration with the architect Olaf Chmielewski and sculptor Mieczysław Syposz)
- Completion date: 27 November 2004

The Monument to Victims of the Wola Massacre (Pomnik ofiar Rzezi Woli) is a monument commemorating the Wola massacre, the brutal mass-murder of the civilian population of Warsaw's Wola district, carried out by the Germans in the early days of the Warsaw Uprising, from 5 to 12 August 1944. It is located in a small square ("Skwer Pamięci") at the intersection of Solidarity Avenue (Aleja Solidarności) and Leszno Street in Warsaw.

The monument was unveiled on 27 November 2004, in the year of the 60th anniversary of the Warsaw Uprising. It was designed by sculptor Richard Stryjecki (in collaboration with the architect Olaf Chmielewski and sculptor Mieczyslaw Syposz) and is made of Finnish granite. The monument was built on the initiative of a committee, headed by Lechosław Olejnick and Krzysztof Tadeusz Zwoliński.

Engraved at the top of the western side of the monument are the following words: "Mieszkańcy Woli zamordowani w 1944 roku podczas Powstania Warszawskiego" ("Residents of Wola murdered in 1944 during the Warsaw Uprising"). Underneath is an extensive list of addresses where the victims lived and the number of people murdered at each location.

Engraved at the top of the eastern side of the monument are the following words: "Pamięci 50 tysięcy mieszkańców Woli zamordowanych przez Niemców podczas Powstania Warszawskiego 1944 r" ("In memory of the 50,000 inhabitants of Wola murdered by the Germans during the Warsaw Uprising of 1944"). On the eastern side of the monument the surface of the granite has ten pits dug into it in irregular shapes which resemble the silhouettes of people lined up against a wall to be executed.

Monument was visited by Ambassador of Germany to the Poland on 1 August 2018. Ambassador Rolf Nikel laid a wreath at the memorial, paid respect and said: We are full of pain and shame a we pay respect to them. Let them rest in peace.

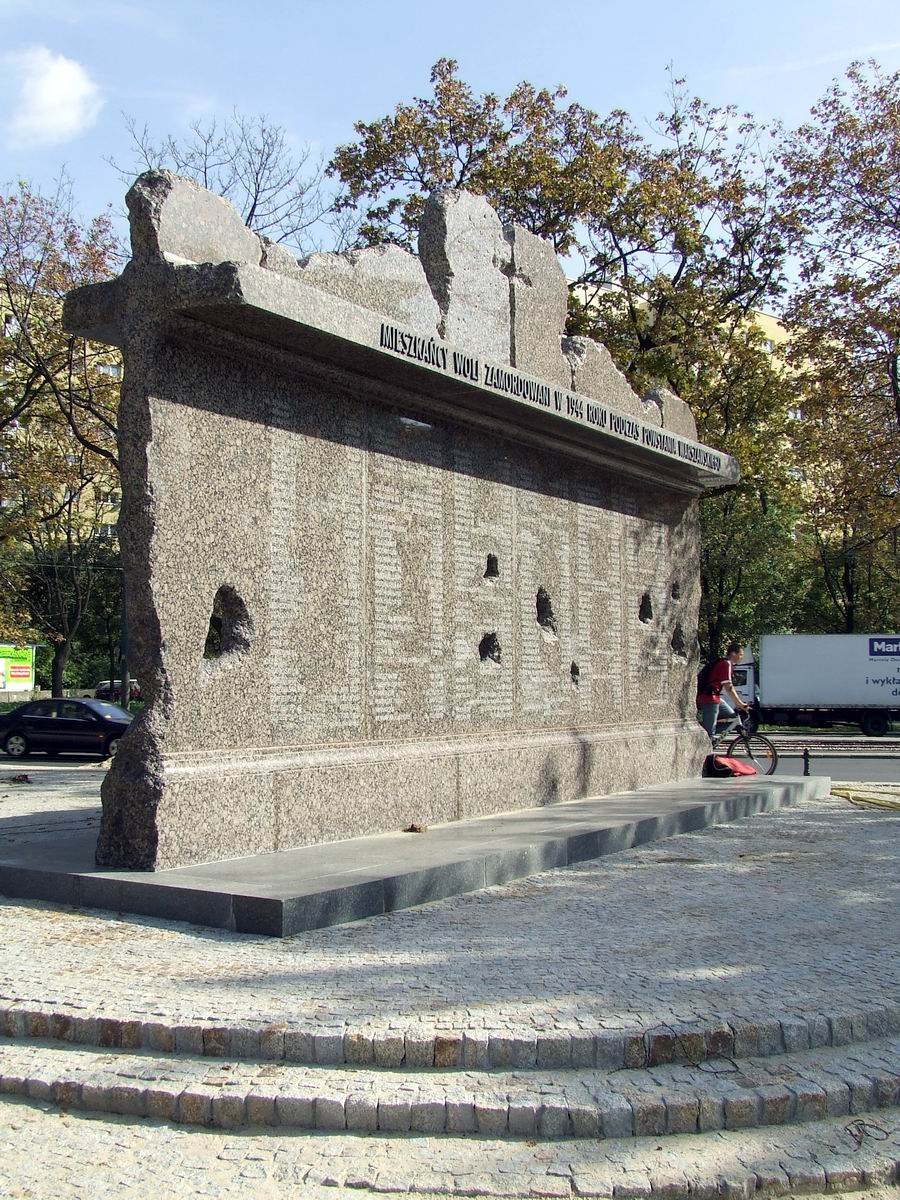

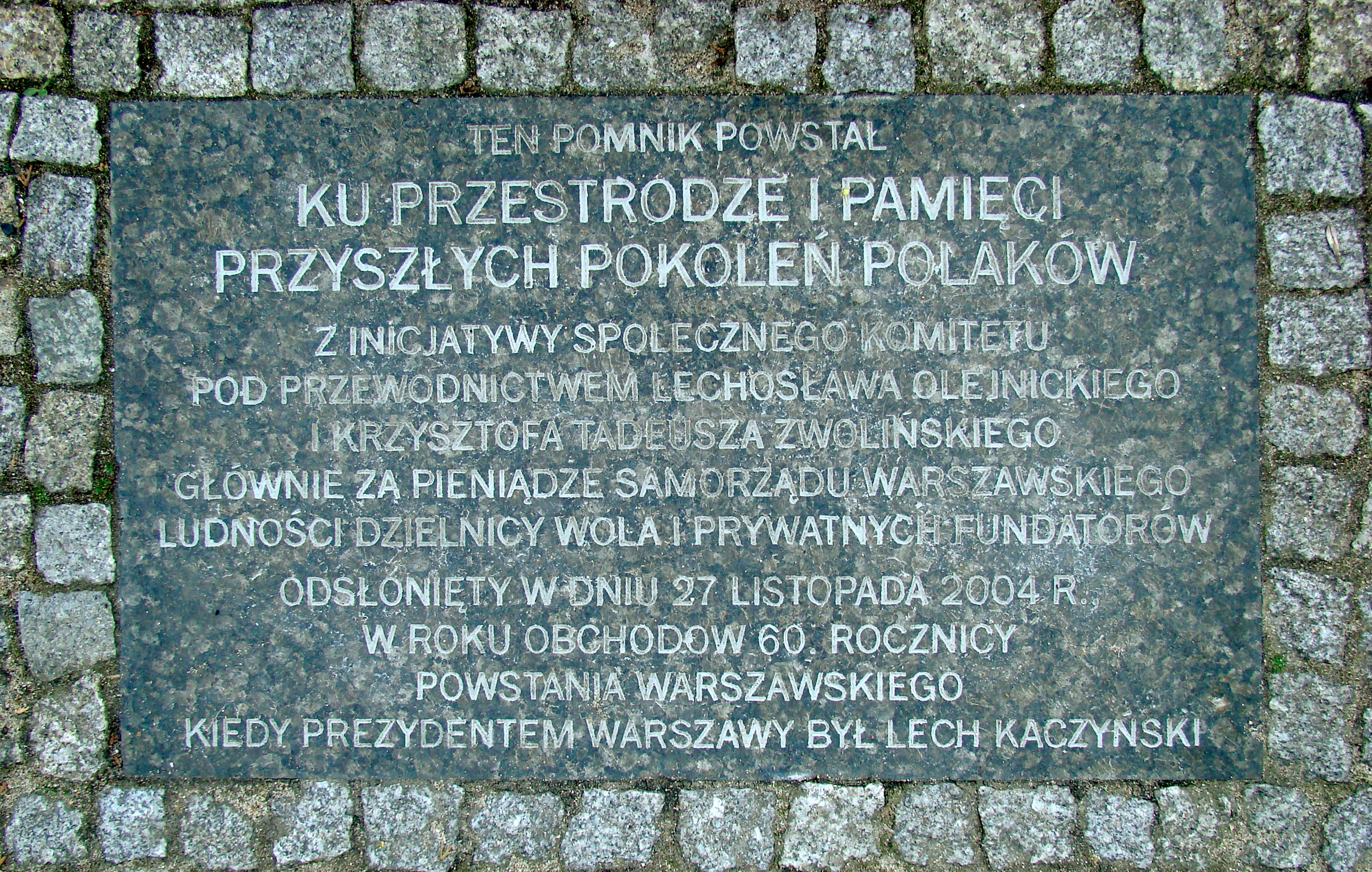

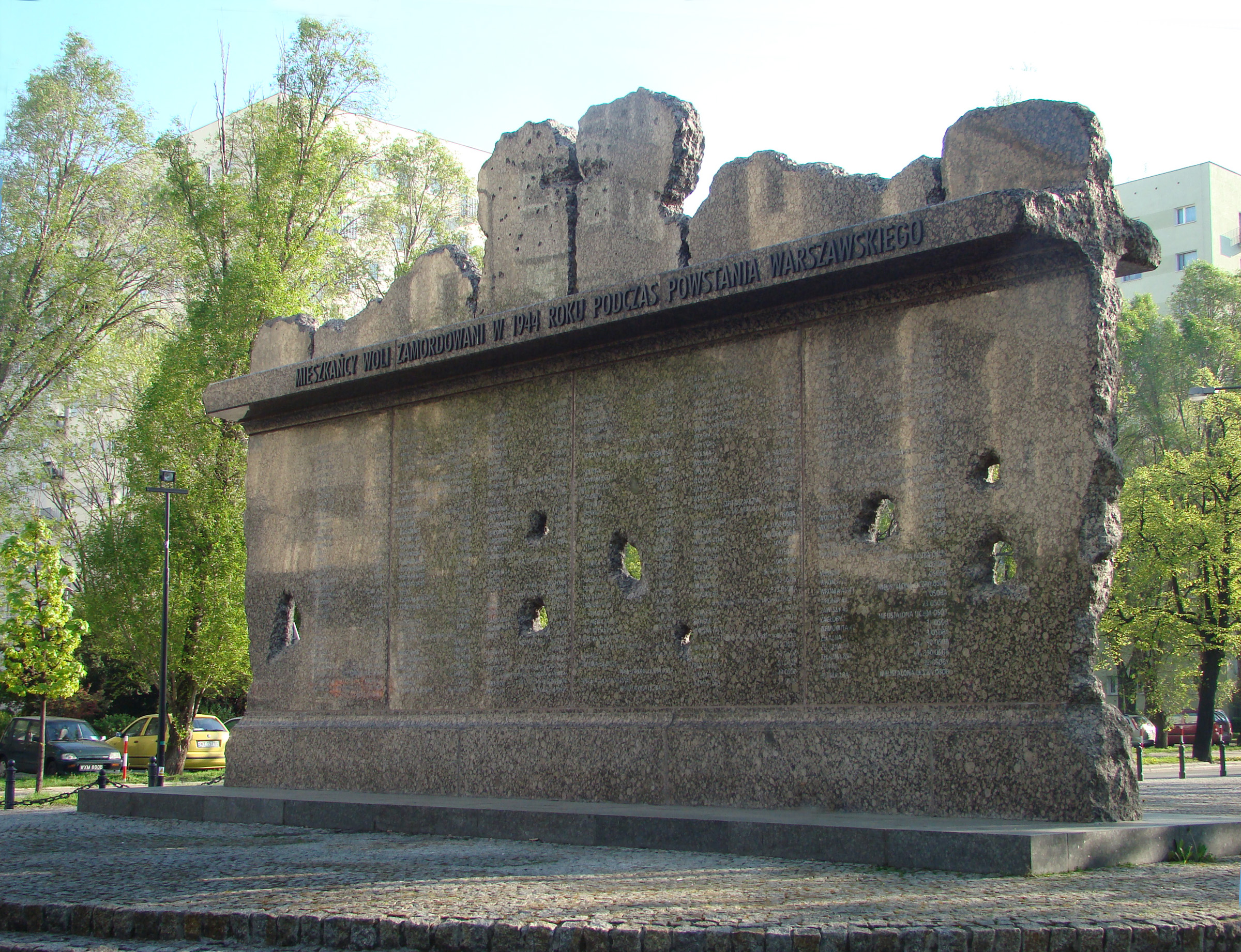

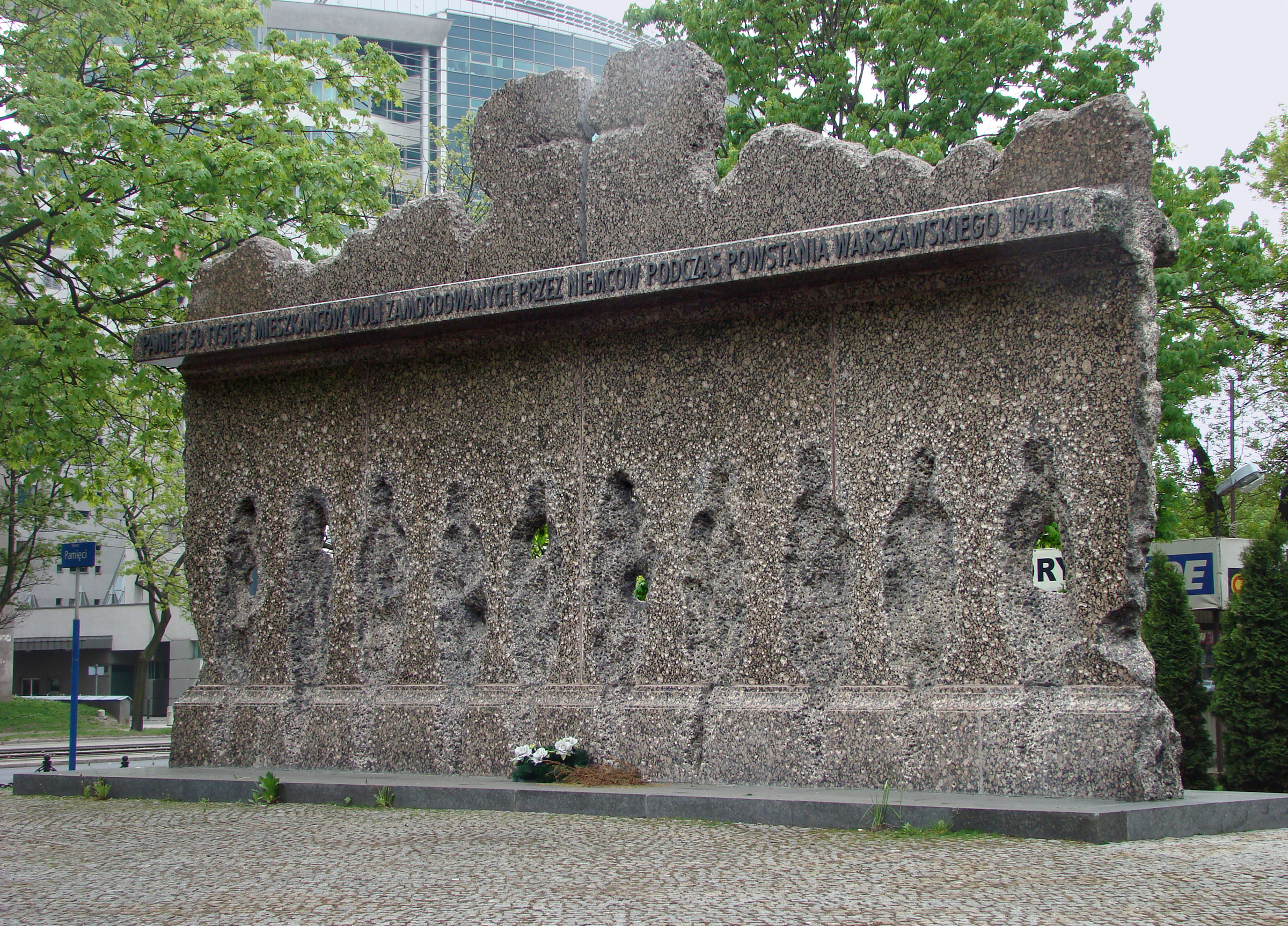

== See also ==
- Warsaw Uprising
- Wola massacre
- Wola Massacre Memorial on Górczewska Street
- Ochota massacre
- Warsaw Uprising Museum

== Bibliography ==
- Niedziela (Sunday) - information about the monument in Polish
