= Ochota massacre =

1944 Nazi massacre in Warsaw, Poland

- Part of Nazi war crimes during the Warsaw Uprising
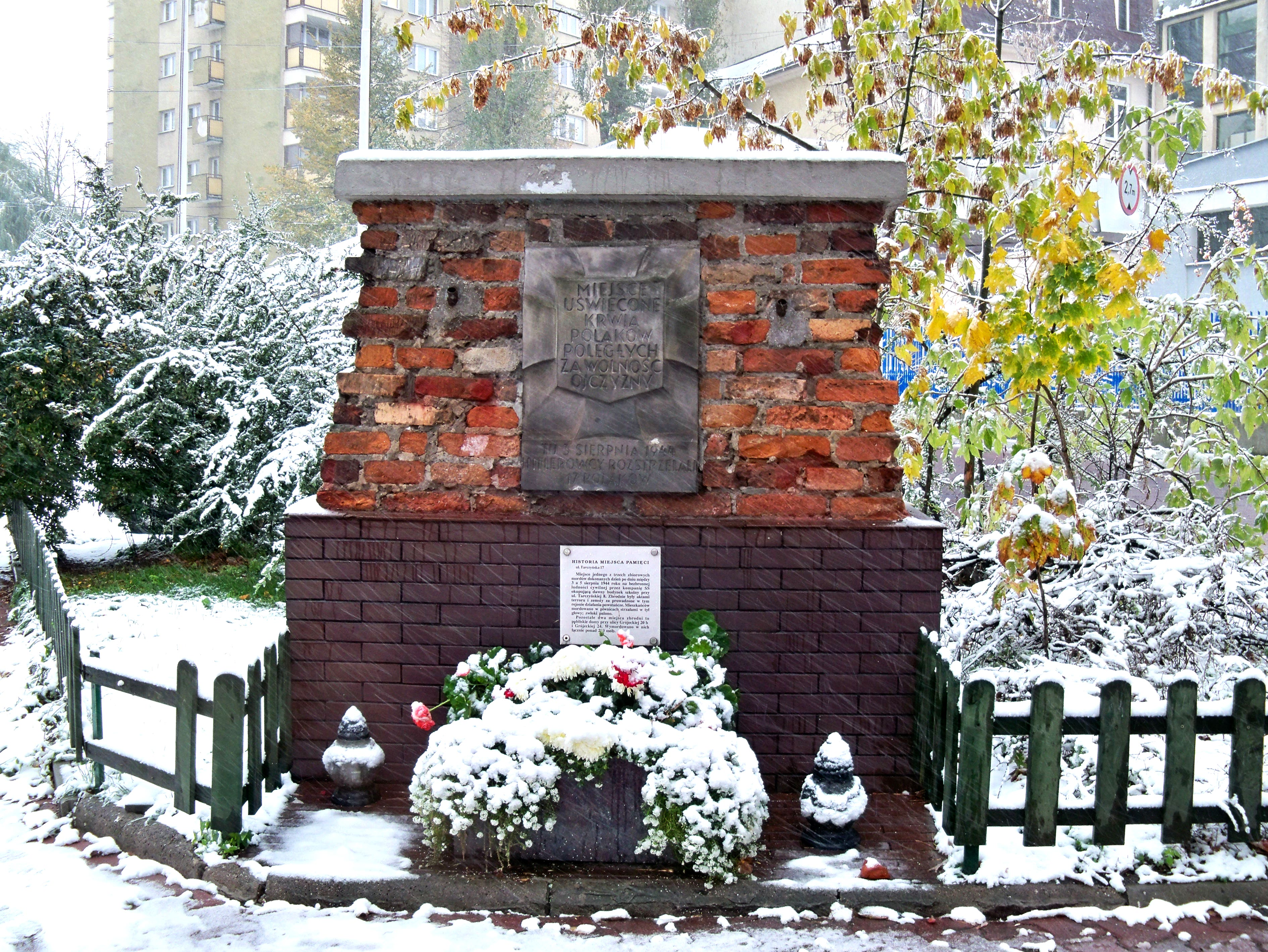
- One of many memorials commemorating massacre sites in Ochota, located at the corner of Tarczyńska and Daleka Streets (17 civilians were murdered here, after which their bodies were burnt)
- Location: 52.210°N 20.971°E; Ochota, Warsaw
- Date: 4–25 August 1944
- Target: Polish civilians
- Attack type: Mass murders, gang rapes, looting, arson
- Deaths: approx. 10,000
- Perpetrator: S.S. Sturmbrigade R.O.N.A. commanded by Bronislav Kaminski
- Motive: Anti-Polish sentiment, Germanisation, pan-Germanism

The Ochota massacre (in Polish: Rzeź Ochoty – "Ochota slaughter") was a wave of German-orchestrated mass murder, looting, arson, torture and rape, which swept through the Warsaw district of Ochota from 4–25 August 1944, during the Warsaw Uprising. The principal perpetrators of these war crimes were the Nazi collaborationist Waffen-Sturmbrigade RONA., the so-called "Russian National Liberation Army" (Russian: Русская Освободительная Народная Армия, RONA), commanded by Bronislav Kaminski.

The worst atrocities were committed in the local hospitals, in the Curie Institute, the Kolonia Staszica housing estate, and the Zieleniak concentration camp. In all, about 10,000 residents of Ochota were killed and had their property stolen, after which the district was systematically burnt down by German forces, as were the bodies of many of the victims.

== The arrival of RONA in Warsaw's Ochota district ==
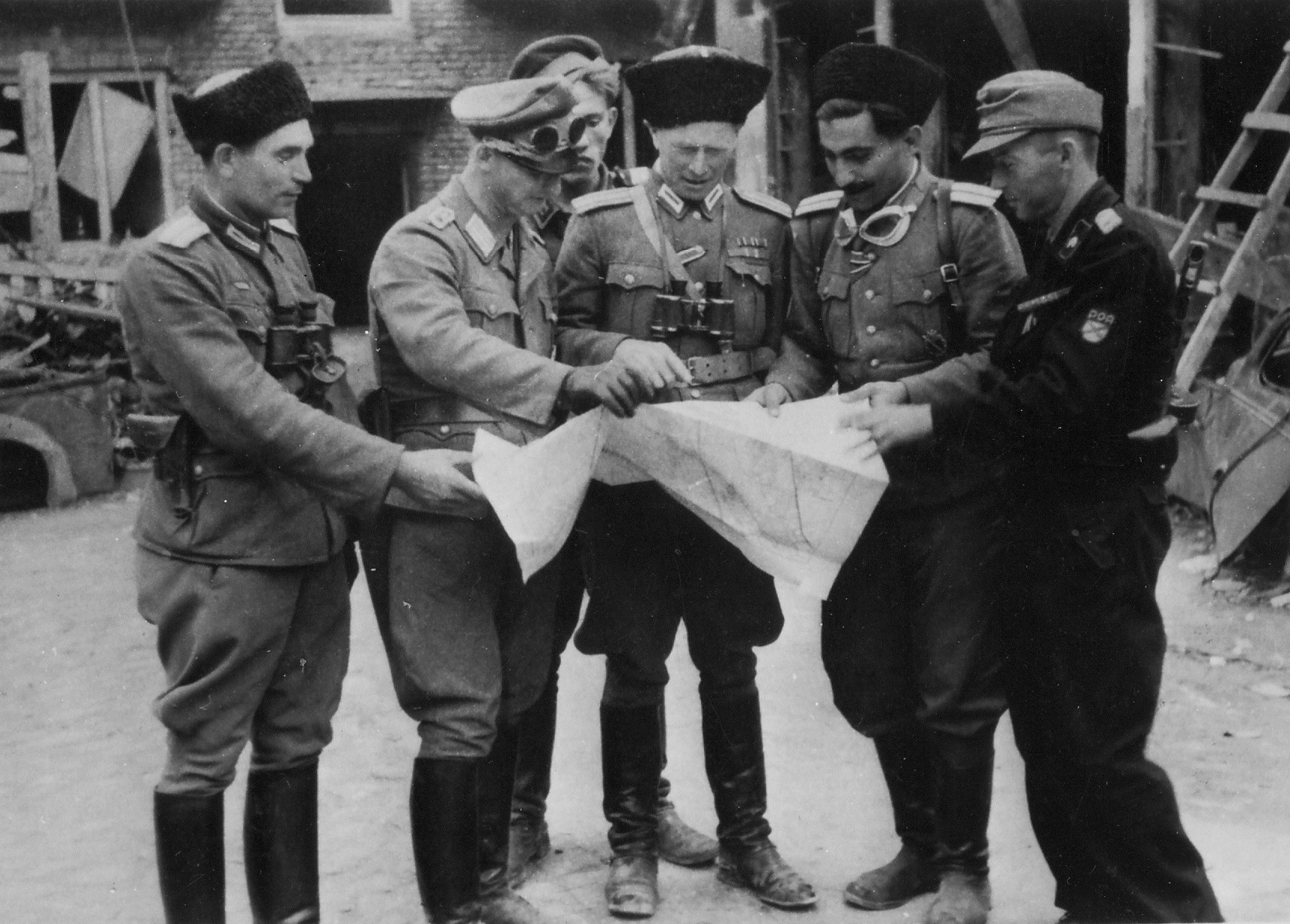
Senior officers from the Russian National Liberation Army (RONA) hold a briefing during the Warsaw Uprising

After the outbreak of the Warsaw Uprising on 1 August 1944, SS-Reichsführer Heinrich Himmler ordered the destruction of the city and the extermination of its civilian population. (Note: "[...] The Führer is not interested in the further existence of Warsaw [...] the whole population shall be executed and all buildings blown up. Madajczyk 1972, p. 390.) (Note: According to the testimony of SS-Obergruppenführer Erich von dem Bach submitted at the Nürnberg trial, Himmler's order (issued on the strength of an order from Adolf Hitler), read as follows: 1. Captured insurrectionists shall be killed whether or not they fight in accordance with the Hague Convention. 2. The non-fighting part of the population, women, children, shall also be killed. 3. The whole city shall be razed to the ground, i.e. its buildings, streets, facilities, and everything within its borders. Wroniszewski 1970, pp. 128–129.)

On 4 August 1944 at approximately 10:00, units of SS RONA commanded by Bronislav Kaminski entered Warsaw's Ochota district. The staff of RONA, having under its command 1,700 soldiers, set up their headquarters in a building of the Wolna Wszechnica Polska (Polish Free University) at 2A Opaczewska Street (today 2 Banacha Street), while the soldiers took over the building of the XXI Liceum Ogólnokształcące im. Hugona Kołłątaja (21st Hugo Kołłątaj Secondary School) at 93 Grójecka Street.

== The start of the massacre ==
RONA's first priority was to attack resistance positions at the so-called "Reduta Kaliska" (Kalisz Stronghold) further along Grójecka Street, but almost immediately, RONA units began the first of a series of robberies, rapes, and murders, initially targeting the civilian population of nearby Opaczewska Street. Groups of RONA soldiers stormed into people's homes and expelled the residents, some of whom were shot - especially if they were reluctant to leave their properties. Most of the buildings in Opaczewska Street were set on fire that day after being systematically looted. On 4–5 August 1944, people were also murdered in nearby allotments, and the residents of 104 Grójecka Street were killed with grenades while hiding in the cellar.

In the first hours of the massacre, RONA troops also entered the Radium Institute where they killed some of the patients. Many of the victims were gang raped, before they were killed – a pattern which was repeated elsewhere.

== Zieleniak camp ==
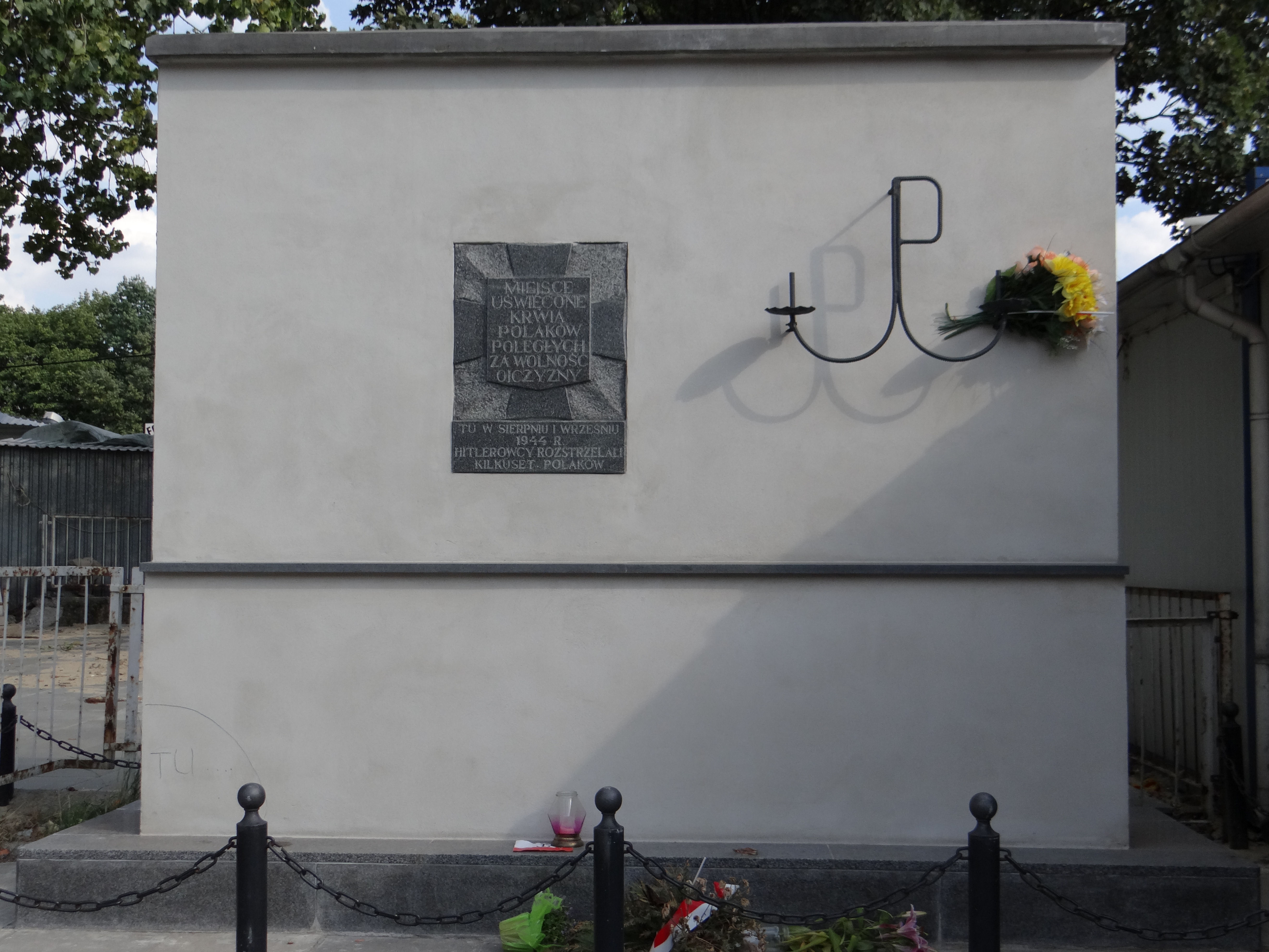
The Zieleniak camp memorial at the site where hundreds of prisoners were shot in August and September 1944

On 5 August, due to the ever-growing number of people being expelled from their homes, the Germans decided to create a transitional camp in Ochota where people could be gathered prior to being transported to the transit camp (Durchgangslager) in Pruszków, outside Warsaw. The transitional camp was located in the area of a former vegetable market called Zieleniak (today the area of Hale Banacha). Between 10 and 20,000 inhabitants of the Ochota district and its neighbouring areas were rounded up by the evening of 5 August.

RONA troops took over the former administration building of the marketplace, and used caretaker boxes as guard posts. The marketplace was enclosed by a brick wall which prevented the prisoners from being able to escape. Crimes against the local population continued during the round ups carried out by RONA troops, who often beat and shot their prisoners while herding them towards the camp, pulling women out of the crowd to rape them, frequently killing them afterwards. At the gate of the camp, the victims were searched for valuables, jewels and money, and then forced into the cobbled area of the marketplace. Once inside the camp, the prisoners were given no sanitary facilities and no medicine or medical aid was available. A small amount of mouldy bread was sometimes given out, but there was no drinking water. In addition, RONA soldiers sometimes shot at the imprisoned people for fun. Erich von dem Bach, commander of all German armed forces in Warsaw during the uprising, inspected the camp on the day of its inception and concluded that "there was nothing wrong there, everything was in order."

By 7 August 1944, the camp was overflowing with civilians. Those who had been killed were laid in piles along the camp wall or buried in a makeshift manner. On the same day, several hundred people of non-Polish descent were escorted away to a similar camp in Okęcie. On 9 August, the first batch of prisoners was marched out of the Zieleniak camp and transported to the Pruszków transit camp.

As German forces gradually pushed the insurrectionists out of Ochota in subsequent days, the camp was once again filled with people from other parts of the district, such as the Kolonia Lubeckiego (Lubecki Housing Estate) and blocks of the Social Insurance Office (ZUS) in Filtrowa Street. The capture of resistance positions along Wawelska Street (the so-called "Reduta Wawelska" - Wawelska Stronghold) on 11 August, was followed by the next wave of people expelled from their homes. As the number of murdered and deceased prisoners increased, their corpses were burned in the gymnasium of the neighbouring Hugo Kołłątaj Secondary School. They were transported to the gymnasium by conscripted civilians who were ordered to lay them in piles, after which RONA soldiers doused the bodies with alcohol and set them on fire. On 12 August, a German officer killed three captured boy scouts of the Gustaw Battalion of the Home Army, shooting them in the backs of their heads as they lowered corpses into an excavated pit. On 13 August, the final evacuation of civilians to the Pruszków transit camp began. Meanwhile, selected men were conscripted into the Verbrennungskommando and continued burning the bodies of the victims of the massacre.

The Zieleniak camp operated until 19 August. During its two weeks of existence, some 1,000 of its prisoners died of hunger, thirst, and extreme exhaustion, or were shot to death by RONA soldiers.

== Radium Institute ==
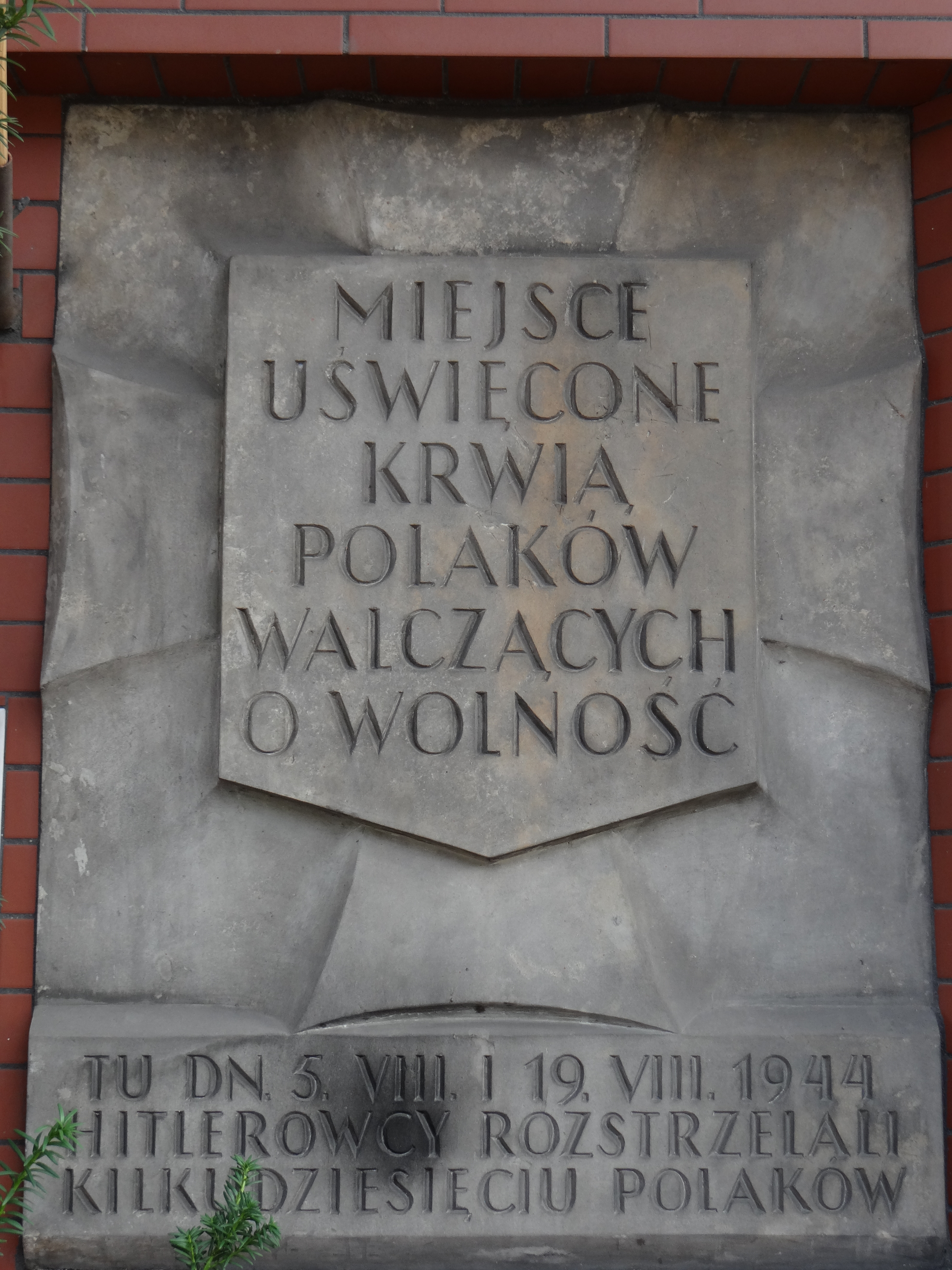
A Tchorek plaque commemorating the staff and patients murdered at the Radium Institute in August 1944

On 5 August, German RONA units broke into the Radium Institute (founded by Marie Curie) at 15 Wawelska Street. After looting the hospital and robbing the staff and patients, they set the library on fire and destroyed the food stock, pharmacy and much of the hospital equipment. After initially deciding to execute the patients and staff inside the institute, the RONA troops then changed their minds and decided that the patients and eight staff members would remain while the rest of the staff were marched off to the Zieleniak camp.

In the evening, nurses who had stayed behind were gang-raped. The next day the building was set on fire and some of the patients were burned alive. Approximately 60 people avoided death by seeking shelter in the building's cellar and chimneys.

On 9–10 August, some survivors were discovered, and RONA set the building on fire again. On 19 August, RONA troops pulled all the remaining survivors who could be found out of the building and killed the 50 critically ill patients on the spot. The remainder were sent to the Zieleniak camp, where they were also executed (according to eyewitness evidence, with a shot to the back of the head) and then burned at a pyre in the gymnasium. Prior to the execution, one female patient (of Ukrainian descent) was released. In total, about 170 people (patients and staff) were murdered.

== Other atrocities ==
Rapes, robberies, arson, executions by firing squad and murders of civilians hidden in cellars (usually by throwing hand-grenades into them) were committed by RONA throughout the Ochota district. They also killed the wounded in the resistance field hospital at 11/13 Langiewicza Street with grenades. Most of the atrocities in Ochota ended with the fall of the last resistance stronghold in the building of the Wojskowy Instytut Geograficzny (Military Geographic Institute) on 13 August 1944. However, on 25 August, patients and personnel of the Szpital Dzieciątka Jezus (Infant Jesus Hospital) in 4 Lindleya Street were beaten and murdered.

== Victims ==
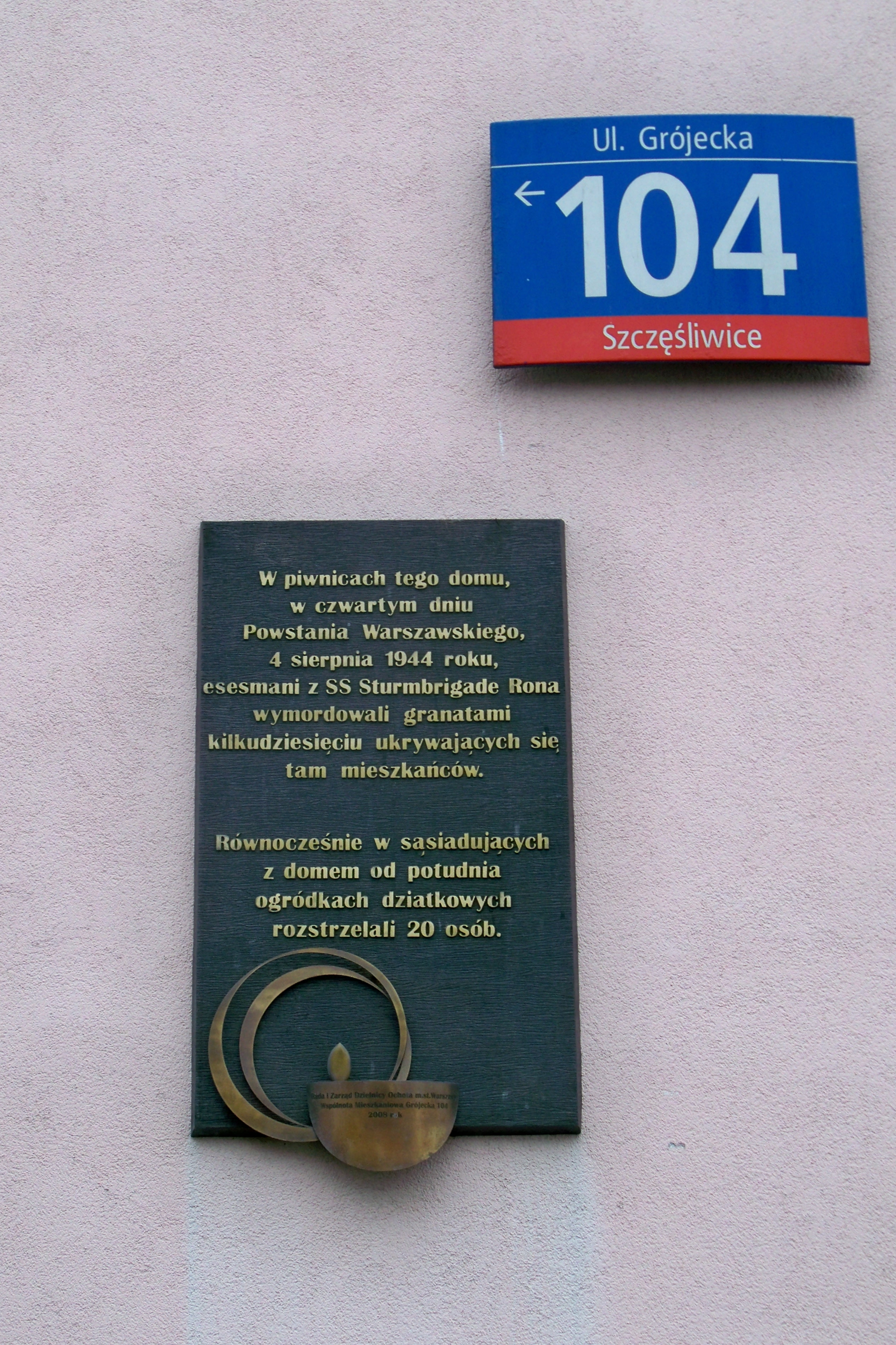
A memorial plaque on the wall of 104 Grójecka Street, where scores of people were killed with grenades in the basement and twenty people were shot in the back yard on 4 August 1944

Approximately 10,000 people were killed in the Ochota massacre, including 1,000 people who died in the Zieleniak camp. Many different sites were used for mass executions, some of which are now marked with memorial plaques to commemorate the victims. Among those killed were the 82-year-old painter Wiktor Mazurowski and his wife, who were murdered at 83 Filtrowa Street, the well-known dramatic actor Mariusz Maszyński and his family, as well as the architect Stefan Tomorowicz and his wife, who were killed in Pole Mokotowskie.

== Systematic looting and destruction of the Ochota district ==
RONA units withdrew from Ochota between 22 and 25 August 1944, but the looting of property in the district continued until the beginning of October. The German occupational administration organised a systematic campaign of pillaging; booty was loaded into goods trains in the Warszawa Zachodnia railway station and sent to Germany. Additionally, convoys of trucks loaded with stolen property were sent to Piotrków Trybunalski. In the end, units of the Vernichtungskommando systematically set street after street on fire, thus effecting the final destruction of the district.

== See also ==
- Defense of Ochota and Wola (1939)
- Warsaw Uprising
- 29th Waffen Grenadier Division of the SS RONA (1st Russian)
- Verbrennungskommando Warschau
- Tchorek plaques#Ochota
- Wola Massacre
- Monument to Victims of the Wola Massacre
- Wola Massacre Memorial on Górczewska Street
- Warsaw Uprising Museum
- Military history of the Warsaw Uprising
- Nazi crimes against ethnic Poles

== Notes ==
=== Sources ===
- Datner, Szymon; Leszczyński, Kazimierz (1962). Zbrodnie okupanta w czasie powstania warszawskiego (w dokumentach) (in Polish). Warszawa: Institute of National Remembrance, Wydawnictwo MON.
- Kazimierski, Józef; Kołodziejczyk, Ryszard (1973). Dzieje Ochoty (in Polish). Warszawa: Państwowe Wydawnictwo Naukowe.
- Madajczyk, Czesław (1972). Polityka III Rzeszy w okupowanej Polsce (in Polish). Warszawa: Państwowe Wydawnictwo Naukowe.
- Wroniszewski, Józef (1970). Ochota 1944 (in Polish). Warszawa: Wydawnictwo Ministerstwa Obrony Narodowej.
- Wroniszewski, Józef (1976). Ochota 1939–1945 (in Polish). Warszawa: Wydawnictwo Ministerstwa Obrony Narodowej.
- Ujazdowska, Lidia (2005). Zagłada Ochoty (in Polish). Warszawa: Wydawnictwo Fronda. ISBN 83-922344-1-3.
