= Tchorek plaques =

Memorial plaque design in Warsaw, Poland

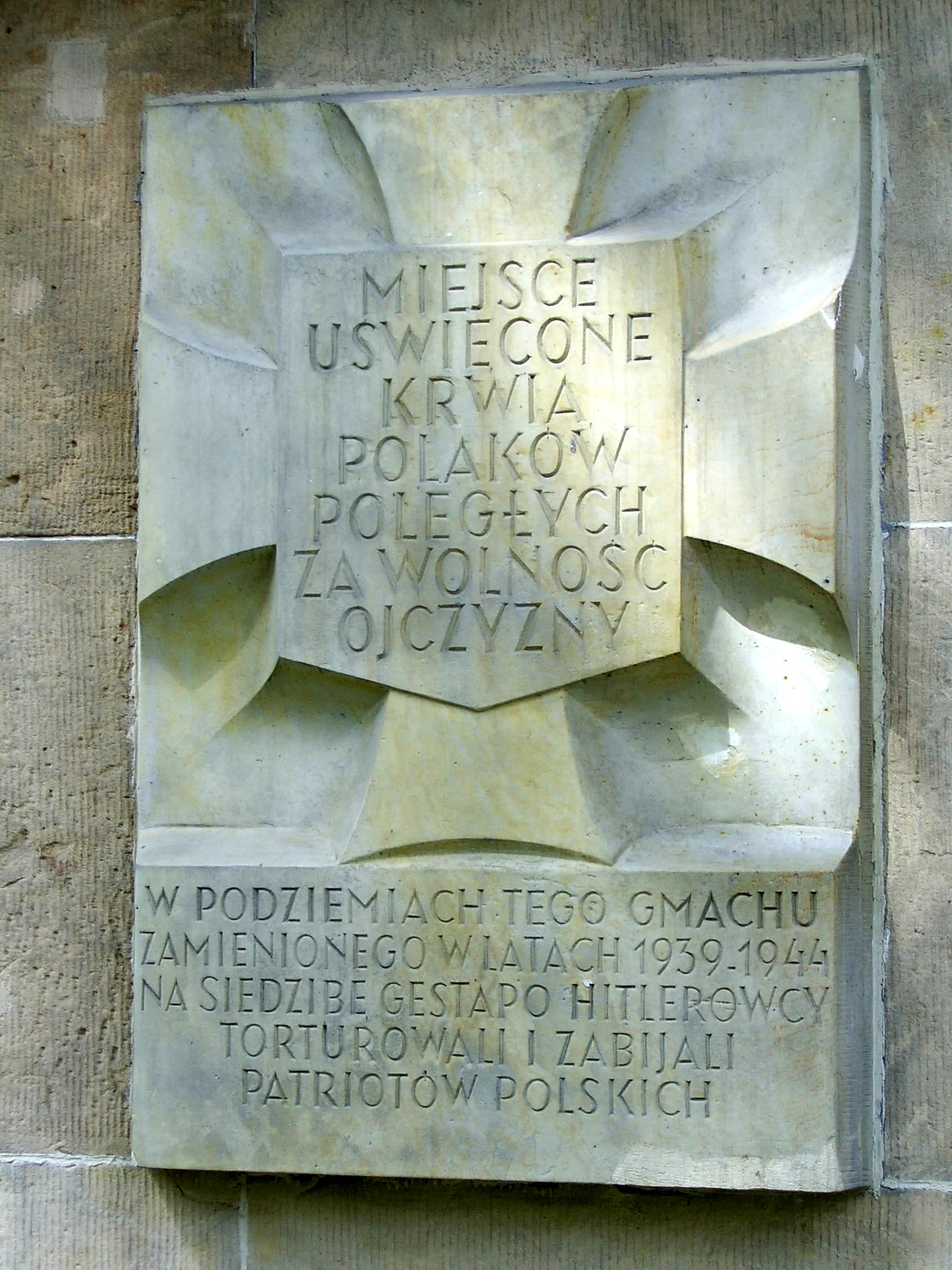
A Tchorek plaque outside the Ministry of Religious Affairs and Public Education (Gmach Ministerstwa Wyznań Religijnych i Oświecenia Publicznego)

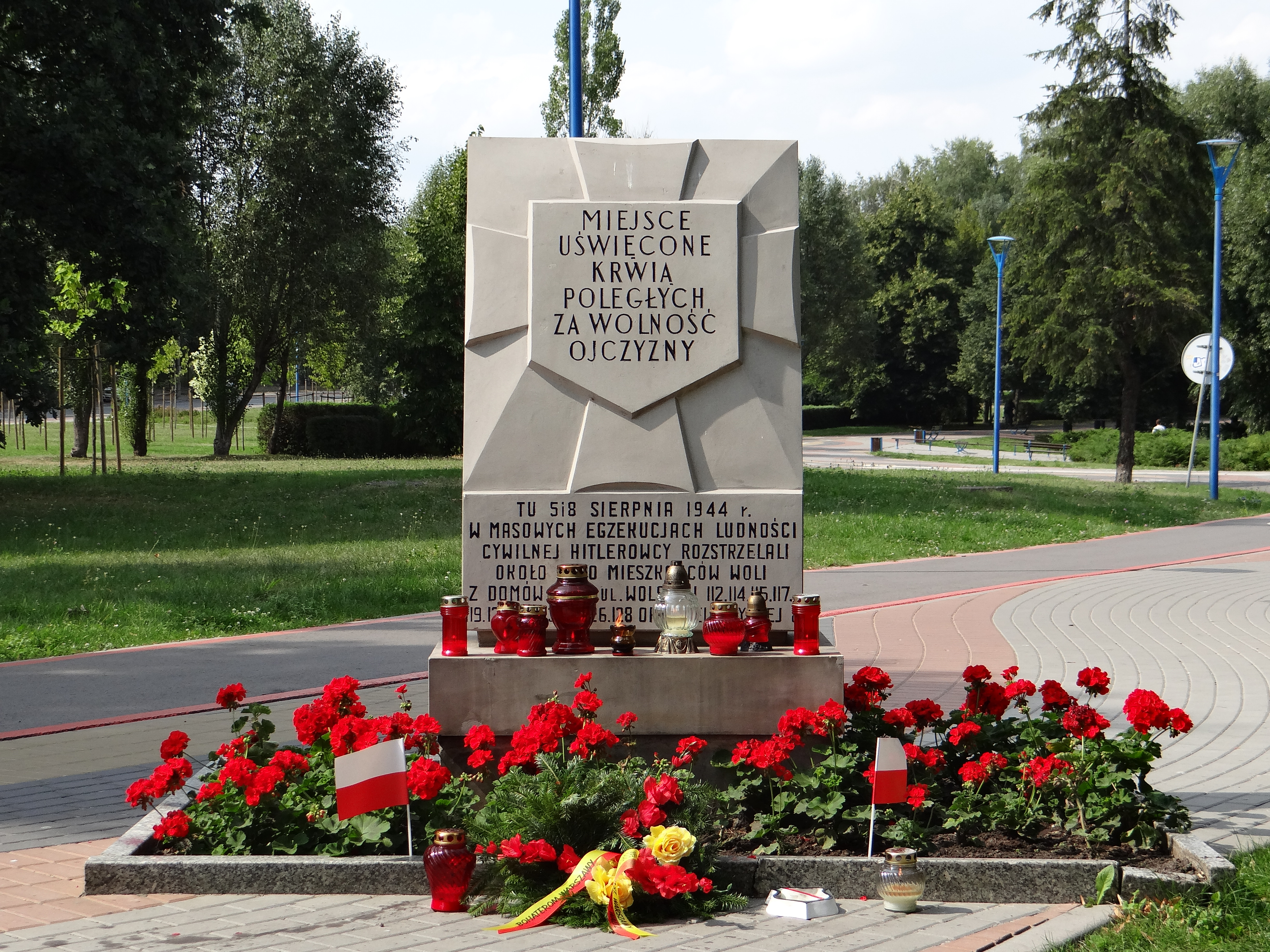
A Tchorek plaque at the entrance of Edward Szymanski Park (Park im. Edwarda Szymańskiego)

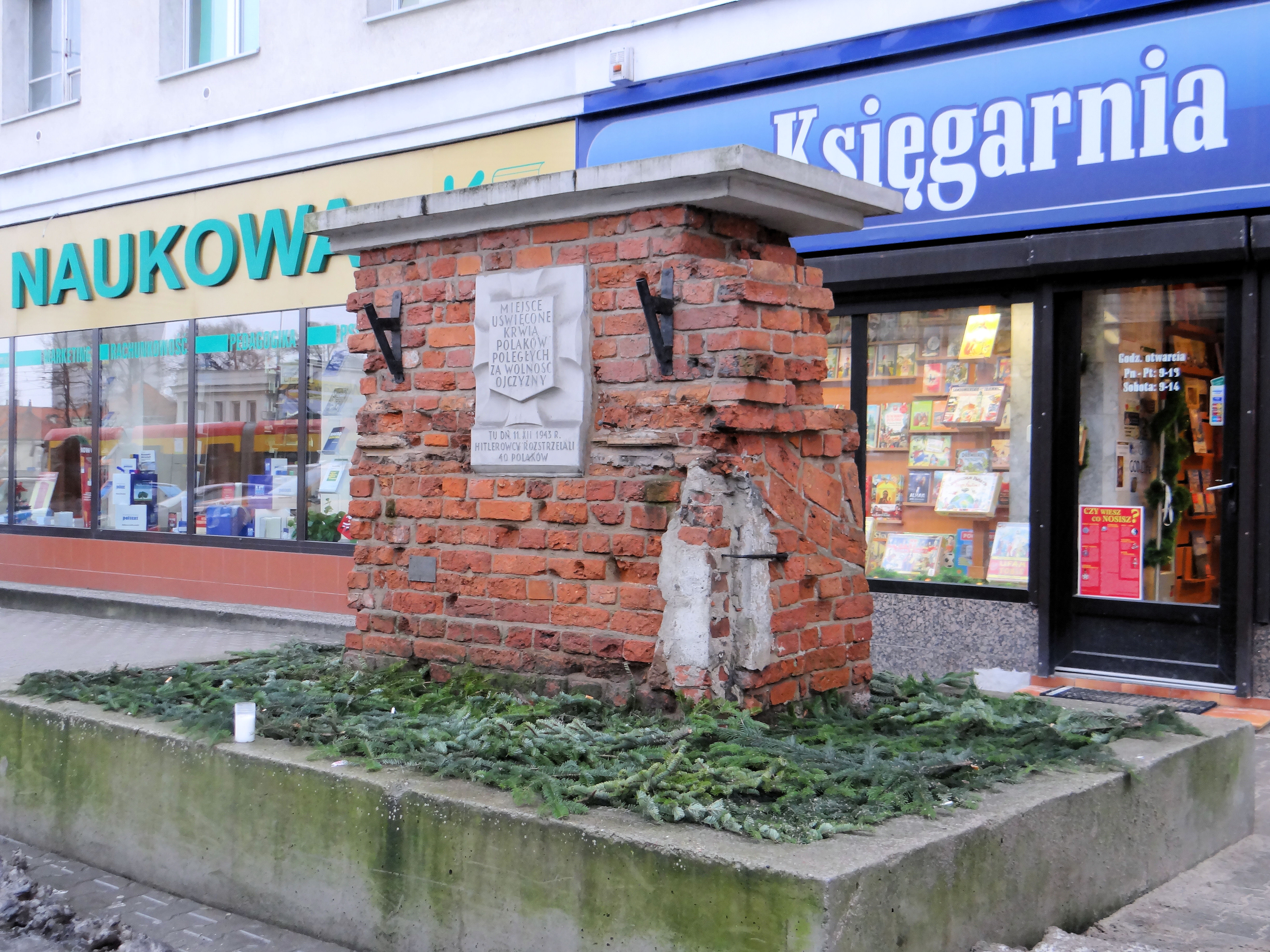
A Tchorek plaque mounted on the surviving fragment of a pre-war building

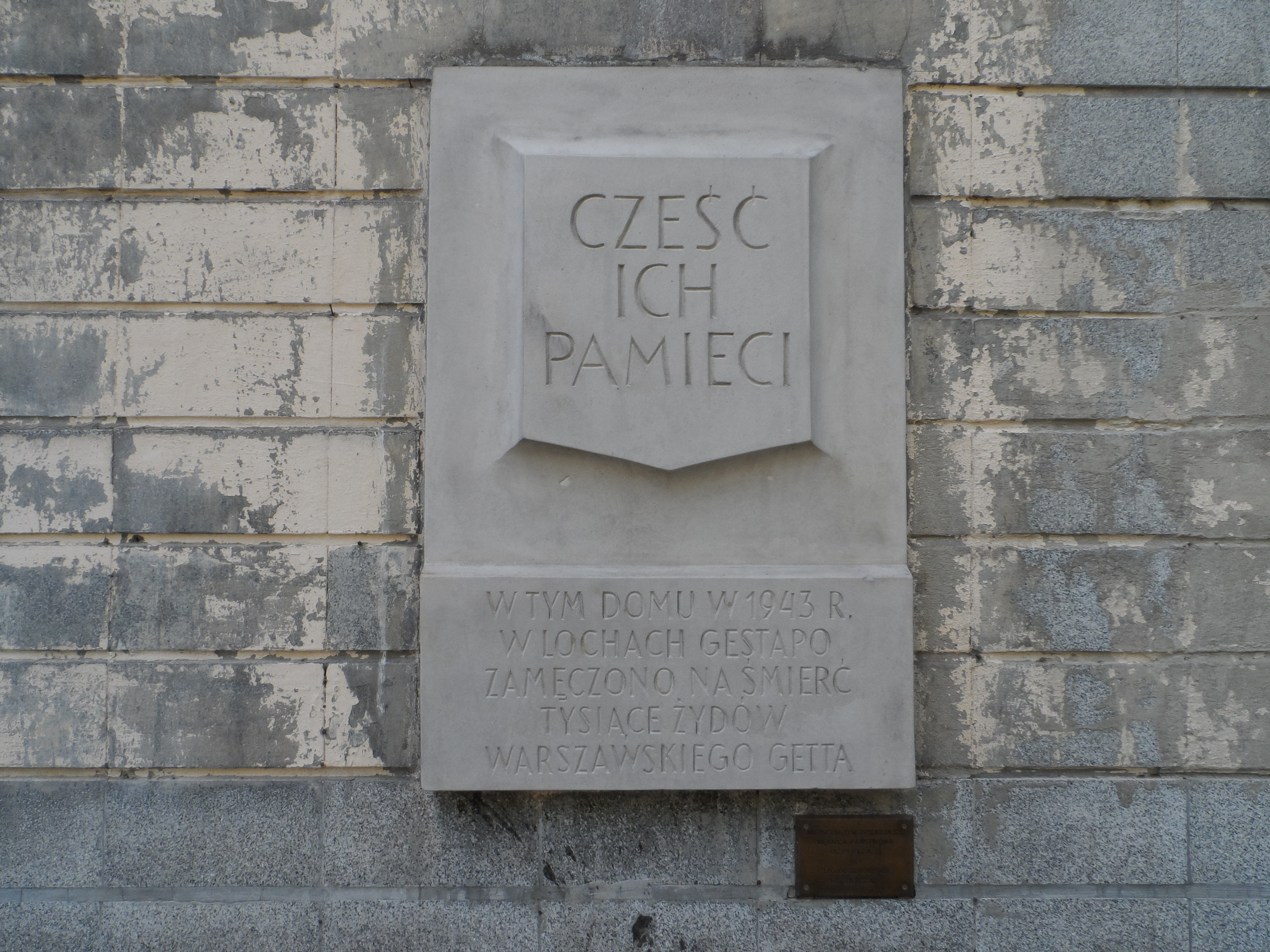
A Tchorek plaque commemorating the murder of the Jewish population

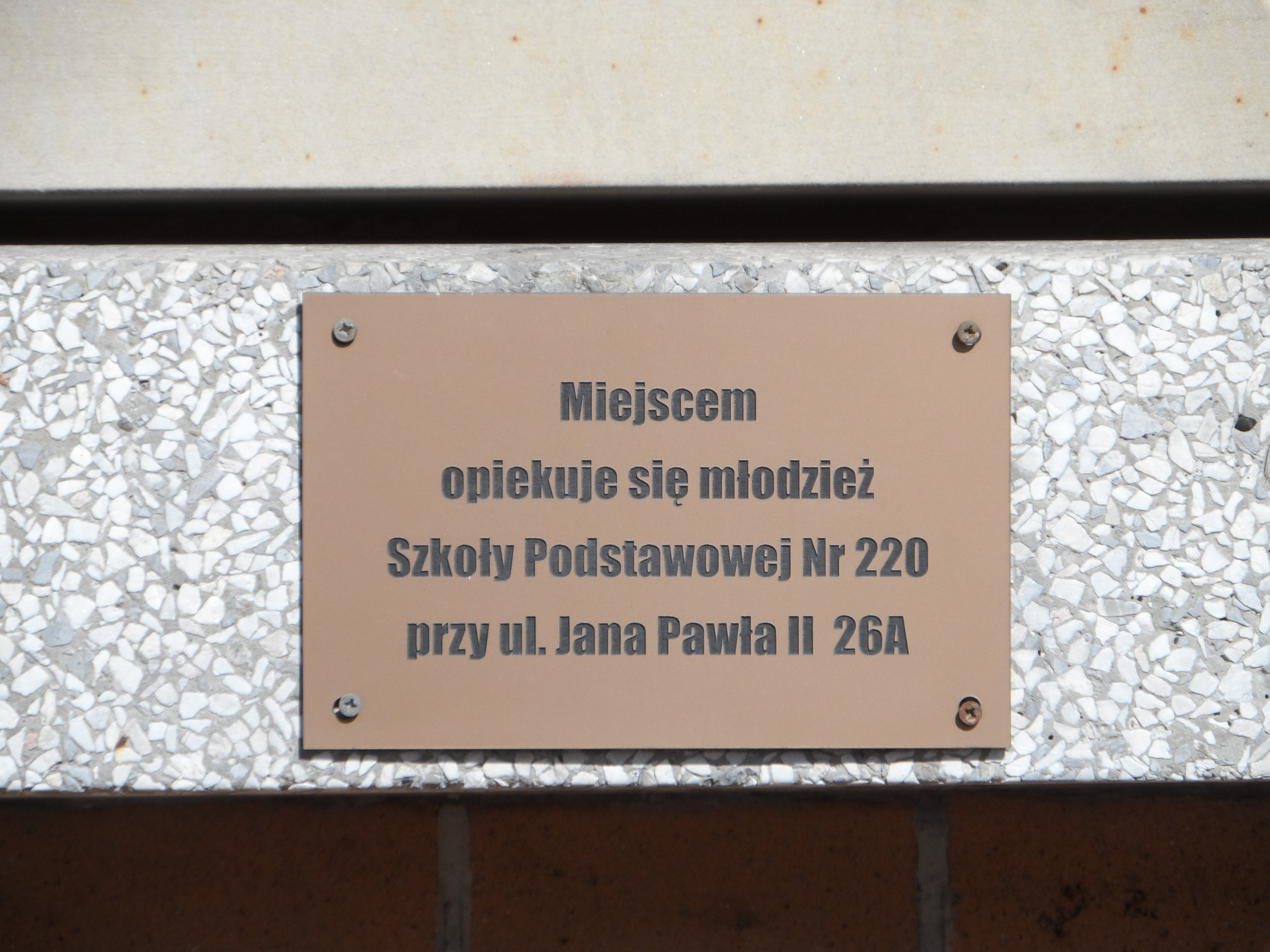
A metal sign indicating the patron of the Tchorek plaque on the wall of Hale Mirowskie

Tchorek plaques are a common design of memorial plaque in Warsaw, Poland, used to commemorate places where battles or executions took place during the German occupation of the city during World War II. They are based on an original design by sculptor Karol Tchorek from 1949.

These plaques were installed at various locations in Warsaw from the 1950s until the end of the communist era in Poland, and are one of the most characteristic elements of the landscape of the capital. Many of the original plaques no longer exist, having been removed or destroyed during the ongoing modernisation and expansion of the city and its transport network. However, in 2013 there were still more than 160 Tchorek plaques within the administrative borders of Warsaw.

== History ==
Warsaw was almost completely destroyed during World War II, and after the Warsaw Uprising of 1944 the entire population of the city was expelled by the Germans. After the Soviet army entered Warsaw in January 1945, following the departure of the Germans, inhabitants returning to the ruined city began to spontaneously commemorate places where battles or executions had taken place during the period of German occupation and the Warsaw Uprising, with crosses and makeshift memorials.

After some time, the authorities of the nascent People's Republic of Poland decided to give these memorials a more formal and organised character. This task was entrusted to the Council for the Protection of Struggle and Martyrdom Sites, established by the city of Warsaw. In the second half of the 1940s the committee decided to use memorial plaques made to a uniform design, which initially consisted of black metal plates adorned with white crosses and a brief description of the events that had taken place at the location.

In 1948, a nationwide competition was announced to create a formal design of memorial plaque to commemorate Polish struggle and martyrdom under German occupation. A year later the first prize was awarded to Warsaw sculptor Karol Tchorek who designed a type of array-relief, forged in grey sandstone, with a Maltese cross in the middle. Starting from the 1950s, "Tchorek plaques" were used to commemorate martyrdom sites in Warsaw and the surrounding suburban towns (including Marki and Opacz Kolonia). Tchorek's design continued to be used until the end of the communist era, and even as late as 1994. According to Ella Chmielewska, the plaques have merged into the landscape of the city to the extent that they are often treated not as works of art, but as a specific element of the urban information system.

In 1962, the Citizens Committee for the Protection of Monuments of Struggle and Martyrdom decided that young people would be entrusted with looking after individual plaques, and most still have their own patrons today. This function is generally performed by schools, public institutions, enterprises, community organisations and professional associations.

Tchorek originally intended the plaques to have a central inscription which read: "This place is sanctified by the blood of martyrdom of Poles fighting for freedom" but this was changed during the implementation of the project to: "This place is sanctified by the blood of Poles fighting for the freedom of their homeland." His proposals for the text describing the commemorated events on individual plaques were also repeatedly modified without his knowledge and consent. This state of affairs became a cause of persistent conflict between Tchorek and the communist bureaucracy. In 1968 a dispute with the Laboratory of Visual Arts over the copyright and remuneration for the lettering of 51 plaques and 35 monoliths was settled in his favour.

The wording of the text was always heavily influenced by political pressure. Most of the plaques commemorate German atrocities that took place during the Warsaw Uprising, an event that the communist authorities of the People's Republic of Poland found highly controversial, as it was organised by the Polish resistance movement which had fought for Poland's independence during World War 2 - principally the Home Army, the remnants of which were brutally suppressed by the post-war Stalinist regime. The significance of the uprising was downplayed for many years after the Second World War, while the Home Army and wartime Polish government were condemned by communist propaganda. These political factors made official memorialisation of the Warsaw Uprising impossible for decades after the war.

For this reason the inscriptions on Tchorek plaques had to be carefully worded to comply with official censorship, principally to avoid any direct reference to the Warsaw Uprising or the Home Army, although they sometimes contain indirect references - for example, in some cases the text mentions "insurgents" or that the commemorated event took place in an "insurgent hospital".

Another linguistic convention used in the inscriptions is that the Germans are always referred to as "Hitlerowcy" (Hitlerites).

The exact number of Tchorek plaques that were created is not known. At the end of 1983 there were still approximately 200 in existence. In his 1987 registry, Stanislaw Ciepłowski evaluated their number at about 180. In this article we describe 165 plaques located within the administrative boundaries of the city of Warsaw.

== Appearance ==
Tchorek plaques are made of sandstone and are either displayed on the walls of buildings or exist as free-standing monoliths. In some cases plaques were added to preserved fragments of buildings that were destroyed during the war. There is often a small metal sign next to the plaque which indicates who is the patron of the memorial.

The central motif of the original design is the Maltese Cross. The shield in the middle of the cross is usually adorned with the inscription: "MIEJSCE UŚWIĘCONE KRWIĄ POLAKÓW POLEGŁYCH ZA WOLNOŚĆ OJCZYZNY" ("a place sanctified by the blood of Poles fallen for the freedom of the fatherland"), although there are minor variations.

Under the Maltese cross symbol there is a short inscription containing basic information about the event that is being commemorated. These inscriptions sometimes contain grammatical, spelling and punctuation errors (a result of the rush accompanying their creation). There are also occasional factual errors - for example, an incorrect date or an inaccurate number of victims. In several cases, Tchorek plaques commemorate events about which there is no mention in historical sources. In 2009, the city of Warsaw appointed a team that made an inventory of the plaques still in existence - however, no attempt was made to correct errors in the inscriptions.

A slightly different form of plaque was used to commemorate Holocaust victims, or the martyrdom of Soviet prisoners of war. Such plaques are distinguished by the lack of the Maltese cross symbol and a shorter central inscription: "CZEŚĆ ICH PAMIĘCI" ("honour to their memory").

Some Tchorek plaques are now in poor condition. Since the end of communist rule in Poland many new memorials have been created in Warsaw (which have no uniform design) and in many cases they directly supersede the original Tchorek plaques.

== Locations ==
Below is a list of existing Tchorek plaques - sorted by district, then by street name. Note that the English translations of the inscriptions are not entirely accurate as they were created with the help of machine translation. The original Polish inscriptions are on the corresponding Polish Wikipedia page.

=== Bielany ===
Picture	Location	Type	Inscription	Commemorated event
Gdańska 12	12 Gdańska Street	On the wall of a building	"A place sanctified by the blood of Poles who died for the freedom of the fatherland. Here on September 14, 1944, the Hitlerites shot 10 civilians"	The plaque commemorates the victims of war crime committed by the German soldiers during the Warsaw Uprising. After the fall of Marymont, on 14 September 1944, around 5-10 Polish civilians were executed in this place.
Podczaszyńskiego	5 Podczaszyńskiego Street	On the wall of a building	"A place sanctified by the blood of Poles who died for the freedom of the fatherland. On May 27 and in the following days of 1944, the Hitlerites shot 9 Poles"	Contrary to what the inscription suggests, an execution of Polish hostages was not carried out in this place. On the night from 26 to 27 May 1944 Sergeant Jerzy Strzelczyk (nom de guerre "Spad"), a platoon commander in the regiment "Baszta” of AK, fought a single-handed battle with German police (attempting to take over an underground weapons store). After a nearly five-hour siege, "Spad" committed suicide.
Pułkowa	30 Pułkowa Street	On the wall of a building	"A place sanctified by the blood of Poles who died for the freedom of the fatherland. Here, on September 22, 1939, Wehrmacht soldiers shot six unarmed residents"	The plaque commemorates the war crime committed by soldiers of the Wehrmacht during the siege of Warsaw in September 1939. On September 22, after fierce fighting, German troops captured Młociny. The soldiers set fire to the brick house belonging to the Grzechociński family and shot six Polish men who were drawn out from its basement. Some of the wounded victims were probably buried alive in a mass grave.

=== Mokotów ===
Picture	Location	Type	Inscription	Commemorated event
Belgijska	11 Belgijska Street	On the wall of a building	"A place sanctified by the blood of Poles who died for the freedom of the fatherland. Here, on August 3, 1944, the Hitlerites shot 23 Poles"	The plaque commemorates the victims of the war crime committed by German troops during the Warsaw Uprising. On August 3, 1944, a unit of German Gendarmerie (state rural police), sent from nearby barracks at Dworkowa Street, murdered at least a few dozens of Poles who lived in houses on Belgijska Street. Among the victims were women and children.
Bokserska	32 Bokserska Street	Free-standing	"A place sanctified by the blood of Poles who died for the freedom of the fatherland. In this area in the first days of August 1944 150 insurgents gave their lives in a fight against the Hitlerites"	The plaque commemorates the soldiers of "Karpaty" battalion of "Baszta" regiment of AK who fallen or were executed after being taken prisoner in the early days of the Warsaw Uprising (1–2 August 1944), when a fierce fighting took place in the vicinity of the Służewiec horse racing track. Also, the plaque commemorates inhabitants of the village of Służew who were murdered by the German troops during the uprising.
Bukowińska	26A Bukowińska Street	On a pedestal near the block of flats	"The place sanctified by the blood of Poles who died for the freedom of their homeland. Here August 5, 1944, the Hitlerites shot 10 Poles"	The plaque commemorates the victims of the war crime committed by German troops during the Warsaw Uprising. On August 5, 1944, German soldiers executed around 10-15 Polish civilians, who were dragged from the shelter at 61 Bukowińska Street.
Chełmska	19/21 Chełmska Street	Free-standing	"The place sanctified by the blood of Poles who died for the freedom of their homeland. Here 25 and 26 August 1944 as a result of bombing by the Hitlerites hospital insurgent killed more than 300 wounded"	The plaque commemorates Ujazdów Hospital, which was moved to this location from Warsaw's downtown in early August 1944, in the first days of the Warsaw Uprising. Despite the Red Cross flags and other indications, that the building is protected by the International humanitarian law, it was bombed twice by the Luftwaffe. From 240 to 300 people were killed: patients, staff members, and the civilians who were seeking protection in the building. The date indicated in the inscription is incorrect. In fact, the air raids took place on August 30 and approximately between 11–15 September 1944.
Dąbrowskiego	3 Dąbrowskiego Street	On the wall of a building	"The place sanctified by the blood of Poles who died for the freedom of their homeland. Here, 3 August 1944, the Hitlerites shot 15 Poles"	The plaque commemorates the victims of the war crime committed by German troops during the Warsaw Uprising. On August 3, 1944, a unit of German Gendarmerie (state rural police), sent from nearby barracks at Dworkowa Street, murdered around 40 residents of the houses no. 1 and 3 at Dąbrowskiego Street.
Idzikowskiego	Idzikowskiego Street, near the corner with Czerniakowska Street	Free-standing	"The place sanctified by the blood of Poles who died for the freedom of their homeland. Here, on 18 September 1944, the Hitlerites shot 40 sick and wounded insurgents"	The plaque commemorates the victims of the war crime committed by German troops during the Warsaw Uprising. The inscription, however, does not accurately inform about the commemorated event. In fact, on September 18, 1944, a few dozens of Polish civilians were executed by German soldiers at 4 Idzikowskiego Street.
Kielecka	29A Kielecka Street	On the wall of a building	"The place sanctified by the blood of Poles who died for the freedom of their homeland. Here, August 22, 1944, the Hitlerites shot 7 Poles"	The plaque commemorates the victims of the war crime committed by German troops during the Warsaw Uprising. On August 22, 1944, German soldiers murdered two men and five women who lived in the house at 29A Kielecka Street.
Klarysewska	55 Klarysewska Street	Free-standing	"The place sanctified by the blood of Poles who died for the freedom of their homeland. Here on September 30, 1944, the Hitlerites shot 30 Poles"	The plaque commemorates the victims of the war crime committed by German troops during the Warsaw Uprising. After the fall of the Sadyba, soldiers of Luftwaffe murdered around 20 to 30 Poles (men, women and children). The date indicated in the inscription is incorrect. In fact, the execution took place on September 2, 1944.
Madalińskiego	39/43 Madalińskiego Street	On the wall of a building	"The place sanctified by the blood of Poles who died for the freedom of their homeland. On 2 August 1944, the Hitlerites shot at. Madalińskiego at no. 19/21 to 20 people at no. 27 to 10 people, and on August 21 at no. 39/43 to 30 people"	The plaque commemorates the victims of the war crime committed by German troops during the Warsaw Uprising. On August 2, 1944, soldiers of the Waffen-SS, who were sent from the nearby Stauferkaserne barracks at Rakowiecka Street, executed a few dozens of Polish civilians who lived in the houses no. 18, 20, 19/21, 22, 23 and 25 at Madalińskiego Street. In the house at 27 Madalińskiego Street, the SS men herd 10 Polish men into a small carpenter's workshop, and then burned them alive. On 21 August, SS men came again at Madalińskiego Street and executed around 30 civilians who lived in the house no. 39/43.
Nabielaka	18 Nabielaka Street	Free-standing	"Honor to their memory", and lying next to the panel: "The place sanctified by the blood of Poles who died for the freedom of their homeland. At this point, November 24, 1943 July 10, 1944 August 3, 1944, the Hitlerites shot 42 Poles"	The plaque commemorates the victims of the various executions conducted in this place during the German occupation of Poland. On November 24, 1943, while SS-Brigadeführer Franz Kutschera occupied a post of SS and Police Leader of the Warsaw District, 10 prisoners of Pawiak were executed in this place. Then, on 1–2 August 1944, in the first days of the Warsaw Uprising, on nearby Belwederska Street, German soldiers murdered a number of Polish civilians who were fleeing from their homes. Historical sources not mention, however, about any execution conducted in this place in July 1944.
Niepodległości 132	132/136 Niepodległości Avenue	On the wall of a building	"The place sanctified by the blood of Poles who died for the freedom of their homeland. Here, August 11, 1944, the Hitlerites shot several civilians"	The plaque commemorates the victims of crimes committed by Germans during the Warsaw Uprising. On August 11, 1944, during the eviction of inhabitants of the house, the Germans shot around 20 Poles (including several women). Among the victims were two popular teachers: Jadwiga Jawurkówna and Jadwiga Kowalczykówna.
Odyńca	55 Odyńca Street	On the wall of a building	"Place of the Polish fight for the freedom of their homeland. Here insurgents in Warsaw in 1944 put a long-term resistance to Hitler's occupants. The battle killed many defenders"	This plaque commemorates the fierce battles fought during the Warsaw Uprising in defense of the so-called "Alkazar" redoubt. Two unfinished houses at the intersection of Odyńca Street and Niepodległości Street ("Alkazar I" and "Alkazar II") were defended by soldiers of the AK "Baszta" regiment up to 25 September 1944.
Olesińska	5 Olesińska Street	On the wall of a building	"The place sanctified by the blood of Poles who died for the freedom of their homeland. At this place, 4 August 1944, the Hitlerites burned approx. 100 Poles"	The plaque commemorates the victims of one of the greatest crimes committed by the Germans in Mokotów during the Warsaw Uprising. On 4 August 1944, German police brought in from the barracks located in nearby Dworkowa Street sent several hundred Poles into the basements of houses on 5 and 7 Olesiński Street, and then killed them with grenades. 100 to 200 men, women and children were killed.
Orężna	23 Orężna Street	On the wall of a building	"The place sanctified by the blood of Poles who died for the freedom of their homeland. Here, August 2, 1944, the Hitlerites shot 83 people"	The plaque commemorates the victims of the crimes committed by Germans during the Warsaw Uprising. On August 2, 1944, at 25 Orężna Street, armed German soldiers murdered about 60 Poles. Among the victims were women, children and old men.
Puławska 15	15 Puławska Street	Free-standing	"The place sanctified by the blood of Poles who died for the freedom of their homeland. Here on. 3 XII 1943, the Hitlerites shot 100 Poles"	The plaque commemorates the victims of one of the largest street execution conducted in the period when SS-Brigadeführer Franz Kutschera occupied a post of SS and Police Leader of the Warsaw District. On December 3, 1943, in the courtyard of the burned house at 21/23 Puławska Street and next to the now-defunct tram depot at Puławska, Nazi-German occupants executed 112 prisoners of Pawiak prison. Among the victims were: Stefan Bryła (professor from Warsaw University of Technology and member of the Polish parliament), Stanisław Siezieniewski (actor and director in theaters in Vilnius and Łódź) and Henryk Trzonek (musician and head of the string quartet at Polish Radio). The hostages were executed in retaliation for the attack on the German Police cars, carried out a day earlier at this point by soldiers of AK Kedyw.
Puławska 71	71 Puławska Street	On the wall of a building	"The place sanctified by the blood of Poles who died for the freedom of their homeland. At this point, 3 August 1944, the Hitlerites shot 108 Poles"	The plaque commemorates the victims of crimes committed by the Germans during the Warsaw Uprising. On August 3, 1944 a branch of the German police sent from the barracks located on the nearby Dworkowa Street killed at least 108 Poles living in houses at 69, 71 and 73/75 Puławska Street (including men, women and children). Among the victims were three members of Magiera family.
Puławska W	Puławska Street, near the corner with Wilanowska Avenue	Free-standing	"The place sanctified by the blood of Poles who died for the freedom of their homeland. Here on August 2, 1944, the Hitlerites executed 27 civilians"	The plaque commemorates the victims of the German crimes from the period of the Warsaw Uprising. On August 2, 1944, the Germans conducted a raid on soldiers of the Armia Krajowa (who had moved their units from hiding near the Warszawa Południe train station), trapping 13 men (including six railroad workers, and two insurgents) and shot them near the intersection of Puławska Street and Wilanowska Avenue.
Rakowiecka 15	15/17 Rakowiecka Street	On the wall of a building	"The place sanctified by the blood of Poles who died for the freedom of their homeland. August 3, 1944, the Hitlerites shot at. Rakowiecka in house no. 4 of 15 people. August 4, 1944 in the house at no. 5 of 10 people and under no. 15/17 to 15 people"	The plaque commemorates the victims of crimes committed by the Germans during the Warsaw Uprising. On 3–4 August 1944 the soldiers from the Waffen-SS barracks Stauferkaserne, supported by dismounted soldiers from the Luftwaffe barracks at Puławska Street began to pacify homes on Rakowiecka Street and on adjacent streets including homes at 5, 9 and 15 Rakowiecka Street, then murdered at least 30 Poles.
Rakowiecka 61	61 Rakowiecka Street	On the wall of the Pontifical Faculty of Theology (near St. Andrzej Bobola Street)	"The place sanctified by the blood of Poles who died for the freedom of their homeland. Here on August 2, 1944, the Hitlerites shot and burned 40 Poles"	The plaque commemorates the victims of the massacre committed by the German troops during the Warsaw Uprising. On August 2, 1944, in the basement of the Jesuit monastery (Dom Pisarzy, literary „The House of Scribes”) SS soldiers murdered around 40 people - including eight priests and eight religious brothers of the Society of Jesus. The victims of this massacre are also commemorated by a memorial of another type, located near the church's fence at Rakowiecka Street.
Rodzynkowa	Rodzynkowa Street	Free-standing	"Place of the Polish fight for the freedom of their homeland. Here in September 1944 battled the heroic soldiers of the landing of the First Army rushing aid to the insurgents of Warsaw"	The plaque commemorates the landing of company 2 Berlin Infantry Regiment (or the Polish People's Army) conducted here on 19 September 1944. The landing had a subversive character, and its purpose was to distract the Germans and thus relieve AK soldiers and 1st Army Regiment fighting on the beachhead at Czerniaków.
Sandomierska 21	21 Sandomierska Street	On the wall of a building	"The place sanctified by the blood of Poles who died for the freedom of their homeland. Here, 4 August 1944, the Hitlerites shot 17 Poles"	The plaque commemorates the victims of crimes committed by the Germans during the Warsaw Uprising. On August 4, 1944, soldiers of the Waffen-SS barracks Stauferkaserne, supported by dismounted Luftwaffe soldiers from Pulawy Street began to pacify the houses facing Rakowiecka Street and on adjacent streets including the building at 19/21 Sandomierz Street where they shot a dozen Polish civilians.
Sandomierska 23	23 Sandomierska Street	On the wall of a building	"The place sanctified by the blood of Poles who died for the freedom of their homeland. Here, 4 August 1944, the Hitlerites shot 9 Poles"	The plaque commemorates the victims of crimes committed by the Germans during the Warsaw Uprising. On August 4, 1944, soldiers of the Waffen-SS barracks Stauferkaserne, supported by dismounted Luftwaffe soldiers from the barracks at Pulawy Street began to pacify homes on Rakowiecka Street and on adjacent streets. At the building at 23 Sandomierz Street, they shot 9 Polish civilians. Among the victims were two wounded girls who burned to death.
Skolimowska	5 Skolimowska Street	On the wall of a building	"The place sanctified by the blood of Poles who died for the freedom of their homeland. At this point, 5 August 1944, the Hitlerites shot 100 Poles"	The plaque commemorates the victims of crimes committed by the Germans during the Warsaw Uprising. On August 5, 1944, the SS and police were brought in from Gestapo headquarters in Szucha Avenue and killed about 100 Poles living in houses at 3 and 5 Skolimowska Street, and about 80 residents of a nearby house at 11 Puławska Street. Among the victims were Captain Leon Światopełk-Mirski aka "Leon" - commander of the Third Area of Armia Krajowa Sub-district V "Mokotów".
Smetany	Smetany Street	On a portion of the wall (at the back of the Dworkowa Street)	"The place sanctified by the blood of Poles who died for the freedom of their homeland. Here, in August 1944, Hitler's criminals shot dead a group of small children aged 5 to 10 years"	In 1965, a resident of Mokotow announced in weekly newspaper "Capital" that during the Warsaw Uprising he witnessed German police shoot a group of small children in the back of Dworkowa Street. That information is not confirmed by research by GKBZH (who investigated the crimes later) or in publications devoted to the Uprising in Mokotów. According to some researchers, the plaque should be treated as a general tribute to the children Mokotow, killed and murdered during the Warsaw Uprising.

=== Ochota ===
Picture	Location	Type	Inscription	Commemorated event
Barska	4 Barska Street	On the wall of a building	"The place sanctified by the blood of Poles who died for the freedom of their homeland. Here on February 10, 1944, the Hitlerites shot 140 Poles"	The plaque commemorates the victims of street executions carried out by the Nazi-German occupants in retaliation for the assassination of SS-Brigadeführer Franz Kutschera. It is not known exactly how many Poles were shot at this place, since 10 February 1944 summary executions also took place at 79/81 Wolska and in the ruins of the ghetto. The number of victims has been taken from the German announcement and is likely to be underestimated.
Grójecka 22	22/24 Grójecka Street	On the pedestal at the side of the building	"The place sanctified by the blood of Poles who died for the freedom of their homeland. Here on August 5, 1944, the Hitlerites executed 40 Poles"	The plaque commemorates Polish civilians murdered by the Germans during the Ochota massacre. On August 5, 1944, an SS barracks from Tarczyńska shot about 40 Poles in the basement of the house.
Grójecka 39	39 Grójecka Street	On the wall of the building (courtyard DS "Bratniak")	"The place sanctified by the blood of Poles who died for the freedom of their homeland. Here in the occupation of 1939-1944, the Hitlerites carried out mass executions"	During the occupation, an academic home at Plac Narutowicza (Narutowicza Square) was converted into a barracks for the German Order Police. In the basement there was a detention area, in which inhabitants of the capital (including persons detained during mass round-ups) were tortured and murdered. In turn, in the first days of the Warsaw Uprising the basement of the building was used to round up the inhabitants of the surrounding houses. At least 38 Polish men were then shot in the courtyard of the barracks.
Grójecka 47	47/51 Grójecka Street	On the wall of a building	"The place sanctified by the blood of Poles who died for the freedom of their homeland. Here 9 November 1943, the Hitlerites shot 40 Poles"	The plaque commemorates the victims of the street execution conducted in the period when SS-Brigadeführer Franz Kutschera occupied a post of SS and Police Leader of the Warsaw District. The number of victims, which informs the writing on the plaque, is erroneous, as it covers all the hostages executed on this day in different parts of the city. In fact, at the intersection of Wawel and Grójecka, about 20 Poles were shot.
Grójecka 95	95 Grójecka Street	On a portion of the wall	"The place sanctified by the blood of Poles who died for the freedom of their homeland. Here in August and September 1944, the Hitlerites executed hundreds of Poles"	The plaque is located in the prewar vegetable market "Zieleniak" (currently Targowisko Banacha). During the Warsaw Uprising it functioned as rallying point for the population of Ochoty (who were being expelled), in which troops of the Kaminski Brigade perpetrated mass murder and rape. The number of deaths is estimated at about 1,000.
Mianowskiego	15 Mianowskiego Street	On the wall of a building	"The place sanctified by the blood of Poles who died for the freedom of their homeland. Here, August 11, 1944, the Hitlerites shot many Poles"	The plaque commemorates the victims of mass executions of the period of the Warsaw Uprising. After the fall of the last insurgent stronghold in Ochota (called "Wawelska" Redoubt) RONA brigade soldiers killed more than 80 people in the area - the wounded insurgents and civilians suspected of being involved in the uprising. One of the victims was Father Jan Salamucha (chaplain of AK "Ochota").
Niepodległości 221	221 Niepodległości Avenue	On the façade of the building	"The place sanctified by the blood of Poles who died for the freedom of their homeland. In this house on 7 August 1944, the Hitlerites murdered about 50 people, residents of the block. Among the victims were many children"	The plaque commemorates Polish civilians murdered by the soldiers of Brigade RONA during Ochota massacre. On August 7, 1944 about 53 people were shot and killed in the house at 217/223 Niepodległości Avenue. Among the victims were many women and children.
Nowogrodzka 78	78 Nowogrodzka Street	On the façade of a building	"The place sanctified by the blood of Poles who died for the freedom of their homeland. Here on August 12, 1944 died at the hands of Hitler's henchmen 67 people"	The plaque commemorates Polish civilians murdered by the Germans during the Ochota massacre. On August 12, 1944, an SS barracks at Tarczyńska shot 67 Poles - residents of neighboring houses and the employees of the Municipal Institute of Health (including the director of the Institute, Aleksander Ławrynowicz).
Tarczyńska	17 Tarczyńska Street, near the corner with Daleka Street	On a portion of the wall	"The place sanctified by the blood of Poles who died for the freedom of their homeland. Here, 3 August 1944, the Hitlerites shot 17 Poles"	The plaque commemorates Polish civilians murdered by the Germans during the Ochota massacre. On August 3, 1944 soldiers from SS barracks at Tarczyńska executed about 17 Poles here.
Wawelska 15	15 Wawelska Street	On the wall of a building	"The place sanctified by the blood of Poles fighting for freedom. Here on 5.VIII. and 19.VIII.1944 Hitlerites shot dozens of Poles"	The plaque commemorates the victims of one of the greatest crimes committed during the Ochota massacre. On 5–6 August 1944, RONA brigade soldiers pacified the Radium Institute of Maria Skłodowska-Curie, while killing, looting and raping. On August 19 surviving patients and staff were driven to a transit camp for "Zieleniak", where 50 patients were shot. Liquidation of the Radium Institute brought together at least 80 of the victims.
Wawelska 66	66/74 Wawelska Street	On the wall of a building	"The place sanctified by the blood of Poles who died for the freedom of their homeland. Here August 5, 1944, the Hitlerites shot 20 Poles"	The plaque commemorates Polish civilians murdered by the soldiers of Brigade RONA during the Ochota massacre. On August 5, 1944 they moved 20 to 40 Polish civilians into the basement of 4 Korzeniowski, then murdered them with grenades and machine guns.

=== Praga Południe ===
PIcture	Location	Type	Inscription	Commemorated event
Wał Miedzeszyński	Wał Miedzeszyński Street	Free-standing (near the Poniatowski Bridge)	"The place sanctified by the blood of Poles who died for the freedom of their homeland. Here on 23 October 1943, the Hitlerites shot 20 Poles"	The plaque commemorates the victims of the street execution conducted in the period when SS-Brigadeführer Franz Kutschera occupied a post of SS and Police Leader of the Warsaw District. On October 23, 1943, in this place the Nazi-German occupants murdered 20 Polish hostages.

=== Praga Północ ===
Picture	Location	Type	Inscription	Commemorated event
Cyryla	4 Cyryla i Metodego Street	On the wall at the gate of the property	"The place sanctified by the blood of Poles who died for the freedom of their homeland. Here, on August 1, 1944, the Hitlerites executed 17 people"	The plaque commemorates 17 civilians murdered by the Germans in the first day of the Warsaw Uprising. Among the victims were Poles, Belarusians, Russians and Ukrainians, which were drag out from a nearby shelter, and then shot at the back of the St. Mary Magdalene Cathedral.
Jagiellońska	5a Jagiellońska Street	On a portion of the wall (facing Kępna street)	"The place sanctified by the blood of Poles who died for the freedom of their homeland. Here, November 12, 1943, the Hitlerites staged executions of 60 prisoners from Pawiak"	The plaque commemorates the victims of the street execution conducted in the period when SS-Brigadeführer Franz Kutschera occupied a post of SS and Police Leader of the Warsaw District. The number of victims on the plaque is erroneous, as it covers all the hostages executed on this day in different parts of the city. Here 30 prisoners of Pawiak prison were shot.
Witkiewicza	10 Witkiewicza Street	Free-standing	"The place sanctified by the blood of martyrdom of Poles who died for their country. On 1.VIII.1944, at this point, the Hitlerites shot and killed 13 guerrillas prepared for action"	The plaque commemorates the place of a battle, and then the execution of a group during the Warsaw Uprising (August 1, 1944).

=== Rembertów ===
Picture	Location	Type	Inscription	Commemorated event
Markietanki	Markietanki Street, near the corner with Cyrulików Street	Free-standing	"Honor to their memory. Here in 1943, the Hitlerites staged murder of 200 Jews"	The plaque commemorates the victims of the liquidation of the ghetto in Rembertów. On August 20, 1942 the Germans sent all the inhabitants of the ghetto to the intersection of Cyrulików and Markietanki streets to carry out an initial selection. Several hundred people unable to walk were taken to a nearby forest and shot there (the victims of this massacre are commemorated by another Tchorek plaque, set near the overpass at Okuniewskai Street in Wesoła). The remaining Jews were driven on foot to the train station in Falenica, and then deported to the Treblinka extermination camp. A group of several dozen people, who were shot on the way while trying to escape, are commemorated by a plaque on the corner of Kajka and VIII Poprzeczna in Wawer.

=== Śródmieście ===
Picture	Location	Type	Inscription	Commemorated event
Agrykola	Agrykola Street, near the corner with Ujazdowskie Avenue	Free-standing	"The place sanctified by the blood of Poles who died for the freedom of their homeland. Here on September 29, 1944, the Hitlerites shot 32 Poles"	Historical sources don't mention executions carried out at this place on 29 September 1944. Probably two days earlier in the area, at least 32 people drowned in the canals while trying to escape from Mokotów to downtown.
Bonifraterska	12 Bonifraterska Street	On the pediment of the Church of John of God	"The place sanctified by the blood of Poles who died for the freedom of their homeland. In this place, on 30 August 1944, the Hitlerites executed patients, doctors and nurses from the hospital of the Brothers Hospitallers, about 300 people"	As described on the plaque, the massacre is not confirmed by historical sources. The fact is that between 1 and 26 August 1944, the Hospital of John of God was heavily strafed and bombed by German artillery and aviation (despite visible signs of the Red Cross). As a result of air strikes and artillery fire, 300 people were killed (wounded, mentally ill, and staff members).
Bracka	16 Bracka Street	On the wall of the building up from Aleje Jerozolimskie	"The place sanctified by the blood of Poles who died for the freedom of their homeland. Here, in August 1944, the Hitlerites executed 90 civilians"	During the fights conducted in the region in the early days of the Warsaw Uprising (August 3–4, 1944), German troops routinely used Polish civilians as "human shields" and murdered the inhabitants of the surrounding houses. They may have killed up to 200 Poles.
Czerniakowska	141 Czerniakowska Street	On the side wall of the building	"The place sanctified by the blood of Poles who died for the freedom of their homeland. In this place on August 2, 1944, the Hitlerites executed 13 people"	The plaque commemorates the victims of the crimes committed by Germans during the Warsaw Uprising. On August 2, 1944, German soldiers set fire to this dwelling house and the adjoining barn, which was a dugout and serving as a makeshift shelter. The flames or German bullets killed 14 people. As originally forged, the plate showed 113 dead, and then, in order to cover the error, first digit was cemented.
Długa 7	7 Długa Street	On the wall of the Raczynski Palace (Pałac Raczyńskich)	"The place sanctified by the blood of Poles who died for the freedom of their homeland. On 1 September 1944 the insurgent hospital, the Hitlerites murdered about 430 people"	The plaque commemorates the patients and staff of the largest insurgent hospital in Old Town, murdered by the Germans after the fall of the district. 430 people were massacred. Please note that the date on the plaque is wrong - the massacre occurred on September 2, 1944.
Długa 13	13/15 Długa Street	On the wall of the Field Cathedral of the Polish Army	"The place sanctified by the blood of Poles who died for the freedom of their homeland. Here 20 VIII 1944 killed 120 wounded and hospital staff AK destroyed by the Hitler's air force, despite the special emblem of the Red Cross" and below: "At this point during the Warsaw Uprising Command's headquarters and hospital battalion "Gozdawa""	The plaque commemorates the Polish field hospital organized during the Warsaw Uprising in the Field Cathedral of the Polish Army. On August 20, 1944 the hospital was bombed by the German air force (even though it was clearly marked with flags of the Red Cross). From 100 to 200 wounded and around 60 members of staff (including 11 nurses) were killed.
Długa 46	46 Długa Street, near the corner with Bohaterów Getta Street	Free-standing	"Place of the Polish fight for the freedom of their homeland. At this point, August 31, 1944 Hitler's air force crashed heroic insurgent redoubt"	The plaque commemorates the breakdown by the German air force of the insurgent redoubt in the Pasaż Simonsa (Simon's Passage), defended by soldiers of the AK "Brave I" battalion (31 August 1944). The victims of this raid also have another Tchorek plaque built in the wall of a nearby block of flats at 66 Solidarności Avenue.
Dobra	96 Dobra Street, near the corner with Mariensztat	Free-standing	"The place sanctified by the blood of Poles who died for the freedom of their homeland. Here, on 3 August 1944, the Hitlerites executed about 20 people"	The plaque commemorates the victims of crimes committed by the Germans during the Warsaw Uprising. On 2 or 3 August 1944 under the fence at 96 Dobra Street a group of Polish civilians were shot. The number of victims of executions is calculated at approximately 24.
Drewniana	8 Drewniana Street	On the wall of School No. 69 (by Dobra Street)	"The place sanctified by the blood of Poles who died for the freedom of their homeland. Here, September 27, 1944 in insurgent hospital Hitlerites shot 22 Poles"	The plaque commemorates the patients and staff of the insurgent hospital, murdered by the Germans. On September 27 1944, soldiers from the SS-Sonderregiment Dirlewanger shot 22 wounded and three women taking care of them (two nurses and the mother of one of the patients). Among the victims were two senior officers of AK "Radoslaw" - Major Wacław Janaszek aka "Bolek" and Captain Mieczysław Kurkowski aka "Sawa".
Ogrody Sejmowe	Edward Rydz-Śmigły Park	Free-standing (at the foot of the Vistula embankment near the building of the Sejm (Polish parliament))	"The place sanctified by the blood of Poles who died for the freedom of their homeland. Here in the years 1939-1941, the Hitlerites made a series of secret executions of Polish patriots"	In the first years of the occupation, the Sejm's Gardens on the slopes of the Vistula embankment were the site of secret executions including representatives of the Polish intelligentsia and people suspected of having ties to the resistance movement. Between October 1939 and April 1940 German policemen killed from a few hundred to a thousand people. Dozens of people were also shot in the Sejm's garden during the Warsaw Uprising.
Elektoralna	5/7 Elektoralna Street	On the wall of the building of the XVII High School (Andrew's University College)	"The place sanctified by the blood of Poles who died for the freedom of their homeland. Here, in August 1944, the Hitlerites shot about 130 Poles"	The plaque commemorates Polish civilians murdered by Germans in the last phase of the Wola massacre. The street was invaded by German troops on August 7, 1944 accompanied by a series of murders of civilians.
Emilli Plater	15 Emilii Plater Street	On the wall in front of property	"The place sanctified by the blood of Poles who died for the freedom of their homeland. Here August 1, 1944, the Hitlerites shot 9 Poles"	On August 1, 1944, fifteen minutes before the Hour "W" (the start of the Warsaw Uprising), Germany made an unexpected intrusion on the depot of the AK "Collar". They found at least 8 men (army soldiers and civilians), which were shot on the spot.
Jasna	12 Jasna Street	On the wall of a building	"The place sanctified by the blood of Poles who died for the freedom of their homeland. In this place on August 18, 1944, the Hitlerites burned 46 insurgents"	The plaque was probably placed here as the result of a mistake. Jasna Street remained in Polish hands until the end of the Warsaw Uprising and there is no evidence in historical sources that massacre of civilians or prisoners of war was conducted in this place by German troops. Some publications suggest that plaque commemorates victims of German air raid however this information is also not supported by historical sources.
Jerozolimskie	37 Jerozolimskie Avenue	On a portion of the wall in front of the Novotel Centrum hotel	"The place sanctified by the blood of Poles who died for the freedom of their homeland. Here, January 28, 1944, the Hitlerites shot 102 Poles"	The plaque commemorates the victims of the street execution conducted in the period when SS-Brigadeführer Franz Kutschera occupied a post of SS and Police Leader of the Warsaw District. The number of victims mentioned on the plaque was taken from a German notice. In fact, probably only 20-30 prisoners of Pawiak prison were murdered in this place, while the other hostages were executed in the ruins of the ghetto.
Kilińskiego	Kilińskiego Street, near the corner with Długa Street	On the wall of the Raczynski Palace	"The place sanctified by the blood of Poles who died for the freedom of their homeland. Here, January 24, 1944 in street executions, the Hitlerites shot 50 Poles"	The plaque commemorates the victims of the street execution conducted in the period when SS-Brigadeführer Franz Kutschera occupied a post of SS and Police Leader of the Warsaw District. A politician, Tytus Czaki, may have been shot along with the hostages.
Kościelna	Kościelna Street, near the corner with Przyrynek Street	Free-standing	"The place sanctified by the blood of Poles who died for the freedom of their homeland. Here on August 29, 1944, the Hitlerites staged murder of civilians"	The plaque commemorates the nuns from the welfare establishment of the Daughters of Charity, murdered by the Germans during the Warsaw Uprising. Eighteen pensioners, mostly infirm, were murdered in the workhouse, a dozen others in the nearby Church of the Visitation of the Blessed Virgin Mary.
Kozia	3/5 Kozia Street	On the wall under the "Bridge of Sighs" (Most Westchnień)	"The place sanctified by the blood of Poles who died for the freedom of their homeland. Here on 10.VIII.1944 Hitlerites shot several hundred Poles"	The plaque commemorates the victims of the crimes committed by Germans during the Warsaw Uprising. On August 10, 1944, German soldiers killed between 100 and 300 Polish men (inhabitants of the surrounding houses).
Krakowskie 62	62 Krakowskie Przedmieście Street	On the wall of the building Caritas Archdiocese of Warsaw	"The place sanctified by the blood of Poles who died for the freedom of their homeland. Here, August 20, 1944, the Hitlerites shot 15 Poles"	The plaque commemorates the victims of German crimes from the period of the Warsaw Uprising. Around 20 August 1944, the Germans shot about 15 Polish civilians, and killed an unknown number of wounded lying in the chapel of the Sisters of Charity Charitable Society.
Krakowskie 66	66 Krakowskie Przedmieście Street	On the wall of the building (at the entrance to the Central Agricultural Library)	"The place sanctified by the blood of Poles who died for the freedom of their homeland. In this place on August 10, 1944, the Hitlerites shot 7 Poles"	The plaque commemorates the victims of crimes committed by Germans during the Warsaw Uprising. On 10 or 11 August 1944, during the displacement of the population of nearby houses, German soldiers shot 8 Polish men.
Kredytowa	1 Kredytowa Street	On the wall of the building of the National Museum of Ethnography	"The place sanctified by the blood of Poles who died for the freedom of their homeland. Here, in August 1944, died in a heroic fight against the Hitlerites 15 soldiers of the Warsaw Uprising"	The plaque commemorates the battle fought by soldiers of the AK Army in the early days of August 1944. During the assaults on the building of the Land Credit Society, which housed the headquarters of the German labor bureau, several insurgents were killed.
Marszałkowska 27	27/35 Marszałkowska Street	On the wall of a building	"The place sanctified by the blood of Poles who died for the freedom of their homeland. Here 3 4 5 August 1944, the Hitlerites executed about 200 Poles"	The plaque commemorates the victims of mass executions carried out by Germans in the area of the "Anca" pharmacy (at 21 Marszałkowska on the corner with Oleandrów). Historians estimate that in the first days of the Warsaw Uprising at least 100 Poles were executed here.
Marszałkowska 136	136 Marszałkowska Street, near the corner with Świętokrzyska Street	On the wall of a building	"The place sanctified by the blood of Poles who died for the freedom of their homeland. Here, on August 1, 1944, the Hitlerites executed 40 civilians"	According to some sources, on the first day of the Warsaw Uprising, the Germans shot about 40 Polish civilians at the corner of Marszałkowska and Swietokrzyska. Studies devoted to places of national remembrance in Warsaw and the crimes committed by the Germans during the Uprising, however, do not confirm this information.
Hale Mirowskie	1 Mirowski Square	On the western wall of the Hale Mirowskie	"The place sanctified by the blood of Poles who died for the freedom of their homeland. 7 and 8 August 1944 in the Hale Mirowskie Hitlerites shot 510 Poles"	The plaque commemorates the residents of Wola and Śródmieścia Północ (north downtown) executed en masse here in the last phase of the Wola massacre. On 7–8 August 1944 Germans killed around 580 Polish civilians at the Hale Mirowskie. Another 110 people were executed in the immediate vicinity of the hall.
Most	Poniatowski Bridge	On the pillar of the viaduct at Wybrzeże Kościuszkowskie Street	"The place sanctified by the blood of Poles who died for the freedom of their homeland. Here in 1944 during the uprising, the Hitlerites executed Polish patriots including 15 platoons of soldiers from 1138 to 1139 the company 3 Clusters III "Konrad" Army"	The plaque commemorates the victims of German crimes from the period of the Warsaw Uprising. On August 3, 1944 under the viaduct of Poniatowski Bridge, Wehrmacht soldiers shot dead 19 soldiers of the Home Army, AK III "Konrad", taken prisoner in the house at number 2, 3 Maja Street.
Niecała	8 Niecała Street	On the wall of a building	"The place sanctified by the blood of Poles who died for the freedom of their homeland. Here on August 8, 1944, the Hitlerites executed 20 civilians"	The plaque commemorates the victims of German crimes from the period of the Warsaw Uprising. On August 8, 1944, during the eviction of inhabitants of neighboring houses, German soldiers shot about 20 Polish civilians.
Niepodległości 208	208 Niepodległości Avenue	Free-standing (in front of the Central Statistical Office)	"The place sanctified by the blood of Poles who died for the freedom of their homeland. Here in July and August 1944, the Hitlerites executed about 30 civilians"	There is a lack of historical sources of information about the events commemorated on this plaque.
Niepodległości 210	210 Niepodległości Avenue	On the side wall of the building (facing al. Armii Ludowej)	"The place sanctified by the blood of Poles who died for the freedom of their homeland. Here, 7 August 1944, the Hitlerites shot 56 Poles"	There is a lack of historical sources of information about the events commemorated on this plaque.
Nowogrodzka 45	45 Nowogrodzka Street	On the wall of a building	"The place sanctified by the blood of Poles who died for the freedom of their homeland. Here, August 18, 1944, the Hitlerites shot 18 postal workers"	During the Warsaw Uprising, a few executions occurred here. One of them is commemorated with a plaque about the execution of 18 postmen on August 18, 1944.
NS49	49 Nowy Świat Street	On the wall of the Bentkowski's tenement house	"The place sanctified by the blood of Poles who died for the freedom of their homeland. Here on 12.XI.1943 Hitlerites shot 30 Poles "	The plaque commemorates the victims of the street execution conducted in the period when SS-Brigadeführer Franz Kutschera occupied a post of SS and Police Leader of the Warsaw District. On November 12, 1943, near this building (opposite the Savoy Hotel), Nazi-German occupants executed 20 prisoners of Pawiak prison.
NS64	64 Nowy Świat Street	On the wall of the Zrazowski's tenement house	"The place sanctified by the blood of Poles who died for the freedom of their homeland. Here on 2.XII.1943 Hitlerites shot 34 Poles"	The plaque commemorates the victims of the street execution conducted in the period when SS-Brigadeführer Franz Kutschera occupied a post of SS and Police Leader of the Warsaw District. A German announcement states the names of 34 people shot but from the information provided by the underground cell in Pawiak prison showed that on December 2, 1943, 50 prisoners were deported to their deaths. Among the victims were two painters - Janusz Zoller and Stanisław Haykowski.
Nowy Zjazd	1 Nowy Zjazd Street	Free-standing	"The place sanctified by the blood of Poles who died for the freedom of their homeland. Here, in August 1944, the Hitlerites executed 15 people"	The plaque commemorates the victims of crimes committed by Germans during the Warsaw Uprising. Between 3 and 5 August 1944, near the "SCHICHT House", German soldiers shot some 15 Polish men. Among the victims were professors from the University of Warsaw: Józef Rafacz, Wacław Roszkowski, Andrzej Tretiak and Eugeniusz Wajgiel.
Mury	Old Town's Defensive Walls	On the inner wall, near Wąski Dunaj Street	"The place sanctified by the blood of Poles who died for the freedom of their homeland. Here, on September 2, 1944, the Hitlerites shot 30 people"	The plaque commemorates the patients in hospitals during the uprising, taken prisoner and executed by the Germans after the fall of the Old City (2 September 1944). In the area at least 70 people were killed.
Defilad	Parade Square	Free-standing (near the intersection of Marszałkowska Street and Świętokrzyska Street)	"The place sanctified by the blood of Poles who died for the freedom of their homeland. Here on August 2, 1944, the Hitlerites executed 40 people"	The plaque commemorates the victims of the massacre carried out in the yard of the now demolished building at 111 Marszałkowska Street. During the first days of the Warsaw Uprising (2 or 3 August 1944) the crew of a German armored car, shot 30 to 44 residents of houses at 109, 111 and 113 Marszałkowska Street. The plaque is set at some distance from the actual place of execution (house No. 111 was on the stretch between the streets Marszałkowska, Chmielna and Złota).
Podwale 25	25 Podwale Street	On the wall of a building	"The place sanctified by the blood of Poles who died for the freedom of their homeland. Here September 2, 1944, the Hitlerites shot 30 Poles"	The plaque commemorates the insurgent hospital patients "under the curve Lantern", murdered by the Germans after the fall of the Old Town. On September 2, 1944 more than 70 wounded in the hospital were shot or burned alive.
Przechodnia	Przechodnia Street, near the corner with Ptasia Street	Free-standing	"The place sanctified by the blood of Poles who died for the freedom of their homeland. Here, on 6 August 1944, the Hitlerites killed more than 100 people"	The plaque commemorates the victims of the crimes committed by Germans during the Warsaw Uprising. On August 6, 1944, on the second day of the Wola massacre, about 100 Polish civilians were shot.
Saski	Saxon Garden	Free-standing (near the Pałac Błękitny ("Blue Palace"))	"The place sanctified by the blood of Poles who died for the freedom of their homeland. Land heroic defenders of Warsaw 1939 and mass executions in the years 1939-1944"	During the siege of Warsaw in September 1939, the Saxon Garden area was bombarded by German artillery and bombarded from the air (the Summer Theatre (Teatr Letni) was burned down). The garden was a location of Polish artillery. In turn, during the Warsaw Uprising, there were numerous executions in the park (including nearly 30 boys and educators from the youth detention center, and Michalitów priests from Struga). In addition, Germans were using "human shields" made up of Polish civilians in the gardens, which were then sent towards the insurgent barricades.
Senatorska 6	6 Senatorska Street	On the wall of the building	"The place sanctified by the blood of Poles who died for the freedom of their homeland. Here on 15.II.1944 Hitlerites shot dozens of Poles"	The plaque commemorates the victims of the last execution carried out by the Germans in the capital before the outbreak of the Warsaw Uprising. On February 15, 1944, near the intersection of Senatorska Street with Miodowa Street, 40 prisoners from Pawiak prison were executed here.
Senatorska 29	29/31 Senatorska Street	On the wall of a building	"The place sanctified by the blood of Poles who died for the freedom of their homeland. Here on August 8, 1944, the Hitlerites executed 15 people"	The plaque commemorates the victims of crimes committed by Germans during the Warsaw Uprising (7 or 8 August 1944). During the eviction of inhabitants of neighboring houses, German soldiers shot at least 10 Poles at the Galeria Luxenburga. One of the victims was probably Father Stanisław Trzeciak - the pastor of the parish of St. Anthony of Padua.
Senatorska 31	33 Senatorska Street	On the wall of St. Anthony of Padua church - on the Ogród Saski side	"The place sanctified by the blood of Poles who died for the freedom of their homeland. At this point, the Hitlerites executed on 3 August 1944, 80 people on 15 August 1944, 70 people"	The plaque commemorates the victims of executions carried out by Germans during the Warsaw Uprising. In the first part of August 1944 in the św. Antoniego z Padwy (St. Anthony of Padua church), Polish civilians were shot en masse. Between 8 and 10 August there at least three summary executions, which killed more than 110 Poles. Its inscription contains numerous errors.
Senatorska 38	38 Senatorska Street	On the side wall of the building	"The place sanctified by the blood of Poles who died for the freedom of their homeland. Here 7 and 14 August 1944, the Hitlerites shot 30 Poles"	The plaque commemorates the victims of the crimes committed by Germans during the Warsaw Uprising. On the grounds of the Hospital of Malta (Pałac Mniszchów), soldiers from the Dirlewanger Brigade killed of 30 Poles in two executions (7 and 14 August 1944).
Słonimskiego	Słomińskiego Street, near the corner with Dawidowskiego Street	Free-standing (under the viaduct)	"The place sanctified by the blood of Poles who died for the freedom of their homeland. Here on 20-X-1943, the Hitlerites executed 20 Poles"	The plaque commemorates the victims of the street execution conducted in the period when SS-Brigadeführer Franz Kutschera occupied a post of SS and Police Leader of the Warsaw District. On October 20, 1943 at the overpass near Gdansk Station, Nazi-German occupants executed 20 Polish hostages.
Solec 41	41 Solec Street	Free-standing (on the edge of the park, near the monument "Glory for Sappers" (Pomnik Chwała Saperom))	"The place sanctified by the blood of Poles who died for the freedom of their homeland. Here, on 18 September 1944 at the hospital insurgent Hitlerites shot 60 wounded Poles"	The plaque commemorates the victims of crimes committed by Germans during the Battle of Powiśle Czerniakowskie. On September 18, 1944 the Germans set fire to the insurgent hospital in the house at 41 Solec Street and flames or German bullets killed about 60 wounded and several nurses.
Solec 63	63 Solec Street	On a portion of the wall	"The place sanctified by the blood of Poles who died for the freedom of their homeland. Here, 30 September 1943, the Hitlerites executed 34 prisoners Pawiak"	The plaque commemorates the victims of the street execution conducted in the period when SS-Brigadeführer Franz Kutschera occupied a post of SS and Police Leader of the Warsaw District. The date of the execution mentioned on the plaque is incorrect. In fact several dozen of Pawiak prison inmates were executed in this place on November 30, 1943.
Solidarności 66	66 "Solidarności” Avenue	On the wall of a residential block (by ul. Długa)	"The place sanctified by the blood of Poles who died for the freedom of their homeland. Here on August 31, 1944 aerial bomb killed 200 insurgents"	The plaque commemorates the victims of the raid conducted by the German air force on the insurgent redoubt in the contemporary marketplace Simons Passage (31 August 1944). Under the rubble of a demolished building were 300 people - most of them soldiers of the AK "Chrobry I" battalion - including the wounded from the battalion aid station. The victims of this raid are commemorated by another Tchorek plaque, standing on a nearby junction of Druga Street and Bohaterów Getta Street.
Solidarności 83	83/89 "Solidarności” Avenue	On a portion of the wall	"The place sanctified by the blood of Poles who died for the freedom of their homeland. Here on 26.X.1943 the Hitlerites shot 30 Poles"	The plaque commemorates the victims of the street execution conducted in the period when SS-Brigadeführer Franz Kutschera occupied a post of SS and Police Leader of the Warsaw District. On October 26, 1943, at the intersection of Leszno Street (today "Solidarności" Avenue) and the now non-existent Rymarska Street, 30 Polish hostages were shot.
Solidarności 89	83/89 "Solidarności” Avenue	On a portion of the wall	"The place sanctified by the blood of Poles who died for the freedom of their homeland. Here on 11.XII 1943, the Hitlerites shot 40 Poles"	The plaque commemorates the victims of the street execution conducted in the period when SS-Brigadeführer Franz Kutschera occupied a post of SS and Police Leader of the Warsaw District. On December 11, 1943 under house No. 5 at Leszno Street (today "Solidarności" Avenue) 27 prisoners of Pawiak prison were executed.
Szucha	25 Szucha Avenue	On the wall of the building of the Ministry of Religious Affairs and Public Education	"The place sanctified by the blood of Poles who died for the freedom of their homeland. In the basement of this building turned into the years 1939-1944 the headquarters of the Gestapo, the Hitlerites tortured and killed Polish patriots"	The plaque commemorates victims of torture and murder carried out in the building of the pre-war Ministry of Religious Affairs and Public Education, which was the headquarters of the Gestapo during the occupation of Warsaw.
Tamka	3 Tamka Street	On the wall of the building (by Smulikowskiego Street)	"The place sanctified by the blood of Poles who died for the freedom of their homeland. Here in the hospital insurgent Home Army III "Konrad" 6 September 1944, the Hitlerites murdered seven seriously injured soldiers and their chaplain and the nearby barricade about 30 residents Vistula"	The plaque commemorates the victims of the crimes committed by Germans after the fall of the Vistula. On September 6, 1944 an insurgent hospital in the basement of the "Alfa-Laval" building, soldiers from the Dirlewanger Brigade killed at least seven patients and the monk caring for them. At the nearby barricade, 30 Polish men were also shot having been previously used as a "human shield". The murdered priest mentioned in the inscription on the plate, was Dominican Father Jan Franciszek Czartoryski - Home Army chaplain of AK "Konrad", who the Catholic Church blessed in 1999.
Opera	1 Theatre Square	On the wall of the building of the Grand Theatre	"The place sanctified by the blood of Poles who died for the freedom of their homeland. On 8 August 1944 in the ruins of the Grand Theatre, the Hitlerites shot 350 Poles"	The plaque commemorates the victims of mass executions carried out by Germans during the Warsaw Uprising. On 8–9 August 1944 in the ruins from the bombing in September 1939, at the National Opera soldiers from the Dirlewanger Brigade executed the inhabitants of the surrounding houses. Around 350 Polish men were killed.
Bagatela	Ujazdowskie Avenue, at the corner with Bagatela Street	Free-standing	"The place sanctified by the blood of Poles who died for the freedom of their homeland. Here 2 and 3 August 1944, in the garden, the Hitlerites executed hundreds of people"	The plaque commemorates the victims of mass executions carried out in the early days of the Warsaw Uprising in the Jordanowski Garden at Bagateli Street. In August and September 1944 in the Jordanowski Garden and the nearby ruins of the General Inspectorate of the Armed Forces, Germans killed at least 5,000 Poles.
Ujazdowskie	21 Ujazdowskie Avenue	On the wall of the building of the Embassy of Hungary	"The place sanctified by the blood of Poles who died for the freedom of their homeland. Here on 2 February 1944, the Hitlerites shot 300 Poles"	The plaque commemorates the victims of retaliatory street execution carried out by Germans, the day after the successful assassination of SS-Brigadeführer Franz Kutschera. The number of victims, mentioned on the plaque, is erroneous, as it covers all the hostages executed on this day in different parts of the city. In fact, about 100 prisoners from Pawiak prison were shot at Ujazdowskie Avenue, and the remaining 200 hostages were secretly murdered in the ruins of the ghetto.
Dunaj	7 Wąski Dunaj Street	On the wall of the building (facing the Rycerska Street)	"The place sanctified by the blood of Poles who died for the freedom of their homeland. Here September 2, 1944, the Hitlerites shot 70 Poles"	The plaque commemorates the patients of hospitals during the uprising, taken prisoner and executed by the Germans after the fall of the Old City (2 September 1944). In the area at least 70 people were killed.
Wierzbowa 9	9 Wierzbowa Street	On the wall of a building	"The place sanctified by the blood of Poles who died for the freedom of their homeland. Here, December 14, 1943, the Hitlerites shot 130 Poles"	The plaque commemorates the victims of the street execution conducted in the period when SS-Brigadeführer Franz Kutschera occupied a post of SS and Police Leader of the Warsaw District. On December 14, 1943 about 70 prisoners of Pawiak prison were executed in this place.
Wierzbowa 11	11 Wierzbowa Street	On the front wall of the building	"The place sanctified by the blood of Poles who died for freedom. Here, December 11, 1943, the Hitlerites executed Poles"	The historical events listed on the plaque lack information in historical sources. Probably the plaque found in this place is a result of a mistake, because the only overt execution of hostages in the region of Wierzbowa Street took place on December 14, 1943 and is commemorated with a separate plaque. Originally the inscription on the plaque told of the shooting of 100 Poles (currently the number 100 is cemented over).
Wierzbowa 11P	11 Wierzbowa Street	On the wall of the building (from the yard)	"The place sanctified by the blood of Poles who died for the freedom of their homeland. Here on November 12, 1942, the Hitlerites executed Polish"	The plaque commemorates the place where on November 12, 1942, the German police shot and killed three Polish men.
Wilanowska	6 Wilanowska Street	On the wall of a building	"The place sanctified by the blood of Poles who died for the freedom of their homeland. Here, August 2, 1944, the Hitlerites shot 14 Poles"	The historical events listed on the plaque lack information in historical sources. It is unlikely that any execution took place there on the second day of the Warsaw Uprising, because German troops did not reach this section of the street before 21 September 1944. Perhaps the house at 6 Wilanowska Street was mistaken for the house at 6 Wilanowska Avenue, where on 2 August 1944 Germans in fact executed about 13-14 Polish men.
Zamkowy	15/19 Castle Square	On the wall of the building	"The place sanctified by the blood of Poles who died for the freedom of their homeland. Here, on September 2, 1944, the Hitlerites executed 50 people"	The plaque commemorates the 50 patients at insurgent hospitals and four accompanying nurses, who the Germans captured after the fall of the Old Town, and then executed at Castle Square (2 September 1944).

=== Targówek ===
Picture	Location	Type	Inscription	Commemorated event
Ziemowita	42 Księcia Ziemowita Street	On a portion of the wall	"The place sanctified by the blood of Poles who died for the freedom of their homeland. Here August 1, 1944, the Hitlerites shot 31 insurgents"	The plaque commemorates the victims of the crimes committed by Germans during the Warsaw Uprising. In the evening of August 1, 1944, after repelling an insurgent attack on a nearby elementary school at Mieszko I, German soldiers began to pacify Targówka Factory. One of the biggest executions took place here where they shot 31 Polish men.
Odrowąża	Odrowąża Street	Free-standing (at the wall of the Jewish cemetery)	"The place sanctified by the blood of Poles who died for the freedom of their homeland. Here, from 23 to 27 August 1944, the Hitlerites executed 40 people"	The plaque commemorates the victims of executions carried out by Germans during the Warsaw Uprising. Between 23 and 27 August 1944, under the wall of the Jewish cemetery at Bródno they shot Poles suspected of involvement in the uprising. In several executions, Germans murdered about 40 Polish civilians (including women, children and a Roman Catholic priest).
Żaba	Żaba Roundabout	Free-standing (at the railway embankment)	"The place sanctified by the blood of Poles who died for the freedom of their homeland. Here on May 4, 1944, the Hitlerites executed 17 people"	The plaque commemorates Polish political prisoners secretly executed by the Germans in the final months of the occupation (according to one source, the victims were soldiers of the AK - and residents of Targówek).
Spytka	Spytka z Melsztyna Street	On the wall	"The place sanctified by the blood of Poles who died for the freedom of their homeland. Here, on August 1, 1944, the Hitlerites murdered 10 people"	The plaque commemorates the victims of the crimes committed by Germans during the Warsaw Uprising. On August 1, 1944 at 2 Kraśnicka Street (next to the railroad tracks), German soldiers shot 10-12 Polish men suspected of involvement in the Uprising.
Toruńska	Toruńska Street, near the corner with Wysockiego Street	Free-standing	"The place sanctified by the blood of Poles who died for the freedom of their homeland. Here 10 October 1942 the Hitlerites hanged 16 prisoners from Pawiak"	The plaque commemorates the victims of public executions carried out by the Germans in retaliation for AK diversionary action directed against the Warsaw railway junction. They then hanged 50 prisoners from Pawiak prison. Because of a mistake, the conversion of numbers on the plaque contains incorrect information. In fact, the executions took place from October 16, 1942, and at Pelcowizna 10 Poles were hanged.
Wysockiego	Wysockiego Street, near the corner with Toruńska Street	On a portion of the wall	"The place sanctified by the blood of Poles who died for the freedom of their homeland. Here, August 2, 1944, the Hitlerites shot 9 Poles"	The plaque commemorates the victims of the crimes committed by Germans during the Warsaw Uprising. On August 2, 1944 9 Polish women were executed - residents of the house at 3 Marywilska Street.
Zabraniecka	Zabraniecka Street	Free-standing (near Utrata Street)	"Honor to their memory. Here, in 1942-1943, the Hitlerites carried out the murder of 600 Jews"	The plaque commemorates the Jews forced into slave labor, and murdered in the German military and railway workshops in Bródno, Żerań and Pelcowiźnie. In 1942-1943, the Germans murdered around 600 Jewish people.

=== Ursynów ===
Picture	Location	Type	Inscription	Commemorated event
Moczydłowska	Kabacki forest, by Tukana Street and near Moczydłowska Street	Free-standing	"The place sanctified by the blood of Poles who died for the freedom of their homeland. Here, during the occupation, the Hitlerites shot 50 guardsmen and about 100 insurgents and civilians "	During the German occupation, Kabacki forest - in the vicinity of the forest road leading from Dąbrówka to Moczydło - was a place of secret executions of Polish political prisoners. Victims were sent from Warsaw or from other locations in Mazovia. During the exhumation conducted after the war in the forest, they found 112 corpses of people shot in mass executions from 1939 to 1944 and another 21 people were killed in individual executions (during the occupation or during the Warsaw Uprising). Because they have only managed to find a few graves, whose existence witnesses mentioned, the number of Poles that were shot in Kabacki forest could reach a few hundred.
Rybałtów	Kabacki forest, near Rybałtów Street	Free-standing	"The place sanctified by the blood of Poles who died for the freedom of their homeland. Here in the years 1939-1944, the Hitlerites executed hundreds of Poles"	The plaque near Rybałtów Street also commemorates the Polish political prisoners shot by the Germans in Kabacki forest. It was placed where one of the mass graves was found.

=== Wawer ===
Picture	Location	Type	Inscription	Commemorated event
Kajki	39 Kajki Street	Free-standing	"The place sanctified by the blood of Poles who died for the freedom of their homeland. Here, in April 1942, the Hitlerites executed 12 prisoners from Pawiak"	On February 26, 1942, several German officers carrying out arrests at VIII Poprzeczna Street in Anin were killed or wounded (according to some sources, the perpetrator of the act was 19-year-old Leszek Kopaliński, others point to unidentified Polish conspirators). In retaliation, on April 29, 1942, in the forest situated opposite the intersection of VIII Poprzeczna Street and Królewska Street (now Michała Kajki Street), the Germans shot 12 Poles. The information about the shooting of prisoners from Pawiak prison is wrong, because the victims of the executions were brought from the detention centre at Daniłowiczowska Street in Warsaw.
KajkiH	Kajki Street, near the corner with VIII Poprzeczna Street	Free-standing	"Honor to their memory. Here, in July 1942, the Hitlerites shot 45 Jews"	The plaque commemorates the victims of the liquidation of the ghetto in Rembertów. During the march to the railway station in Falenica (from where the inhabitants of the Rembertów ghetto were to be deported to the Treblinka extermination camp) dozens of Jews tried to escape. They were all shot by the German escort. The date on the plaque is wrong since the tragedy took place August 20, 1942. Two other Tchorek plaques commemorating the Jews from the ghetto in Rembertów are located at Markietanki Street on the corner with Cyrulików (Rembertów) and on Okuniewskiej Street, (Wesoła).

=== Wesoła ===
Picture	Location	Type	Inscription	Commemorated event
Okuniewska	Okuniewska Street	Free-standing (in the forest, near the viaduct/embankment of the railway line)	"Honor to their memory. In this area in August 1942, the Hitlerites staged murder of 300 Jews"	The plaque commemorates the hundreds of Jews murdered during the liquidation of the ghetto in Rembertów. On August 20, 1942, Germans sent more than a thousand inhabitants of the ghetto to the intersection of Cyrulików Street and Markietanki in Rembertów, from where they drove them on foot to the train station in Falenica, and then deported them to the Treblinka extermination camp. A few hundred Jews unable to walk (elderly, sick, disabled) were taken to the forest between Rembertów and Wesołą and shot. A group of several dozen people, on the way to Falenica tried to escape, which is commemorated by a plaque on the corner of Kajka and VIII Poprzeczna in Wawer.

=== Wilanów ===
Picture	Location	Type	Inscription	Commemorated event
Przyczółkowa	56C Biedronki Street	"Honor to their memory. In 1943, these areas Hitler's people killed by hunger around 400 Soviet prisoners of war, and many Jews and Poles"	Free-standing (on the left side of the property, on the path leading to the pond)	There was a German POW camp (Stalag 368) located here at Fort Beniaminów. From October to December 1941, Soviet prisoners of war were held and forced to work there. After two months with a group of about 400 prisoners, only 60 remained alive.
Przyczółkowa	10 Wiechy Street	Free-standing	"The place sanctified by the blood of Poles who died for the freedom of their homeland. Memory of the four members of the military conspiracy killed on 12 May 1943 in the fight against Hitler's gendarmerie"	The inscription on the plate very accurately describes the commemorated event but gives the wrong date. On 9 May 1943, local Germans tried to stop the soldiers of the AK "Baszta" (Tower) regiment returning from forest exercises. One of the trainees was shot and three others were captured and released into the hands of the German police, who murdered them on the spot. In retaliation, on September 26, 1943, AK soldiers carried out a militant-repressive action codenamed "Wilanów".
Przyczółkowa	Przyczółkowa Street, near the corner with Klimczaka Street	Free-standing	"Honor to their memory. Here, in May 1944, the Hitlerites shot 67 Jews"	In May 1944, on the Pola Wilanowskie (“Wilanowskie fields”), by a clump of bushes called "Kopciówka", Germans shot 67 Jews. The names of the victims and the exact date of execution are not known.
Kostki	25 Stanisława Kostki-Potockiego Street	Free-standing	"Place of the Polish fight for the freedom of their homeland. Thus, in January 1945, 14 people of the Polish People's Army made an attack on the Hitlerites and prevented them from blowing up the Belweder"	The plaque commemorates combat operations conducted by the 14 Kolobrzeski Infantry Regiment during the Vistula–Oder Offensive. In January 1945, the regiment breached the Vistula River at Wilanów and liberated the southern part of Warsaw.

=== Włochy ===
Picture	Location	Type	Inscription	Commemorated event
Okęcie	172 Krakowska Avenue	On a portion of the wall	"The place sanctified by the blood of Poles who died for the freedom of their homeland. Here on 9.XII.1943 the Hitlerites shot 10 Poles"	The plaque commemorates the victims of the street execution conducted in the period when SS-Brigadeführer Franz Kutschera occupied a post of SS and Police Leader of the Warsaw District. According to Regina Domańska, on that day, beneath the house at 172 Krakowska Avenue, the Nazi-German occupants executed 25 hostages. However, witnesses of the execution put the number of victims at about 10.

=== Wola ===
Picture	Location	Type	Inscription	Commemorated event
Bema	57A Bema Street	On a portion of the wall	"The place sanctified by the blood of Poles who died for the freedom of their homeland. Here on 9.VIII.1944 the Hitlerites murdered 70 Poles"	The plaque commemorates the victims of the massacre perpetrated by the Germans in the last phase of the Wola massacre. In the area, on 9–11 August 1944, German police pulled about 100 Poles from the crowd - the elderly, crippled people, children, and pregnant women. These people were locked in the house at 54 Bema Street (disguised with the flag of the Red Cross), which was then set on fire. All the people trapped there died in the flames or from German bullets.
Chłodna 35	35/37 Chłodna Street	On the wall of a building	"The place sanctified by the blood of Poles who died for the freedom of their homeland. Here, in the first days of August 1944, the Hitlerites shot 200 people and burned corpses brought from other places"	The plaque commemorates Polish civilians murdered and burnt at the site during the Wola massacre. On August 6, 1944 and in the following days, the Germans carried out several mass executions in the courtyard of what was then Roeslerów School. They murdered between 200 and 300 people (including some Jews).
Chłodna 52	52 Chłodna Street	On the wall of a building	"The place sanctified by the blood of Poles who died for the freedom of their homeland. Here, in August 1944, the Hitlerites executed more than a dozen Poles"	The plaque commemorates a dozen Polish civilians murdered here during the Wola massacre (between 6 and 18 August 1944).
Działdowska	8 Działdowska Street	On the wall of a building	"The place sanctified by the blood of Poles who died for the freedom of their homeland. In early August 1944, the street was the site of several Działdowska collective executions. The Hitlerites burned the corpses here of 600 Poles"	The plaque commemorates Polish civilians murdered and burnt at the site during the Wola massacre. On "Black Saturday," August 5, 1944, at homes at 3, 5, and 8 Działdowska, German soldiers killed an unknown number of residents (many of the victims were burned alive in the torched buildings). Members of the Verbrennungskommando later burned corpses of about 600 people who were brought from various streets of Wola.
Szymańskiego	Edward Szymański Park	Free-standing	"The place sanctified by the blood of those who died for the freedom of their homeland. Here, on 5 and 8 August 1944 in mass executions of civilians, the Hitlerites executed about 4,000 residents of Wola, inhabitants of the houses at 112, 114, 115, 117, 119, 120, 121, 123, 124, 126 and 128 Wolska Street and 8 Elekcyjna Street"	The plaque commemorates the victims of mass executions carried out by the Germans during the Wola massacre. On "Black Saturday," on August 5, 1944, in the yard in the front of the former forge at 122/124 Wolska Street, at least 720 Poles (men, women and children) were murdered.
Staszica	5/7/9 Górczewska Street, near the corner with Staszica Street	Free-standing	"The place sanctified by the blood of Poles who died for the freedom of their homeland. Here on August 5, 1944, the Hitlerites shot and burned about 2,000 Poles"	The plaque commemorates Polish civilians murdered and burnt at the site during the Wola massacre. On "Black Saturday," August 5, 1944, in the area of the "Domu Zakonnic" (House of the Nuns at 9 Górczewska Street), Germans killed at least 1,000 inhabitants of Wola.
Górczewska 14	14 Górczewska Street	On the wall of a building	"The place sanctified by the blood of Poles who died for the freedom of their homeland. Here on 18 and 21-XII-1943, the Hitlerites shot 43 Poles"	Inscription on the plaque contains many incorrect information. In the period when SS-Brigadeführer Franz Kutschera occupied a post of SS and Police Leader of the Warsaw District, two street executions were conducted at the intersection of Górczewska and Płocka streets. However, the executions took place on 23 December 1943 and on 13 January 1944 and their victims are commemorated with another plaque – located on the wall of a nearby house at 15 Górczewska Street.
Górczewska 15	15 Górczewska Street	On the wall of the building (Kolonia Wawelberga)	"The place sanctified by the blood of Poles who died for the freedom of their homeland. Here, December 23, 1943, the Hitlerites shot 57 Poles. On Jan. 13, 1944, the Hitlerites executed about 300 Poles"	The plaque commemorates the victims of the street execution conducted in the period when SS-Brigadeführer Franz Kutschera occupied a post of SS and Police Leader of the Warsaw District. The number of victims mentioned on the plaque is incorrect. In fact, on 23 December 1943 and 13 January 1944 at the corner of Górczewska and Płocka streets, about 40 Polish hostages were killed.
Górczewska 32	32 Górczewska Street	Free-standing (at the intersection with Prymasa Tysiąclecia Avenue, in front of the car dealership)	"The place sanctified by the blood of Poles who died for the freedom of their homeland. Here, from 5 to 12 August 1944 in mass executions of civilians, the Hitlerites shot 12 000 Poles, among them hospital patients and staff from the street Płocka"	The plaque commemorates the place of the greatest number of executions by Germans during the Wola massacre. Between 5 and 8 August 1944, in the backyard of the building at the intersection of Górczewska Street and Zagłoby Street (currently non-existent), near the railway embankment, Germans murdered between 4,500 and 10,000 inhabitants of Wola. Among the victims were approximately 360 patients of Wola Hospital, residents of Płocka Street and three priests officiating at the church of St. Wojciech on Wolska Street.
PSowińskiego	Józef Sowiński Park	Free-standing	"The place sanctified by the blood of Poles who died for the freedom of their homeland. In this park in August 1944, the Hitlerites executed 1,500 people and burned the bodies of about 6,000 residents of Wola"	The plaque commemorates the victims of mass executions carried out by Germans during the Wola massacre. On "Black Saturday," on August 5, 1944, at the Sowińskiego Park, around 1,500 Poles were shot. In the following days, Verbrennungskommando burned the bodies of 6,000 victims, which were brought in from different streets of Wola.
Karolkowa 49	49 Karolkowa Street	On the front of the St. Clemens Maria Hofbauer church	"The place sanctified by the blood of Poles who died for the freedom of their homeland. Here, on August 6, 1944, the Hitlerites executed about 30 Roman Catholic priests"	The plaque commemorates more than 30 priests and religious staff of the Order of Redemptorists who were murdered by the German troops during the Wola massacre. The information given on the board is inaccurate, because in reality all of the Redemptorists were murdered in the factory at Kirchmajera and Marczewskiego streets near 79/81 Wolska Street.
Karolkowa 53	56 Karolkowa Street	On the wall of the Special Education School Complex no. 101	"The place sanctified by the blood of Poles who died for the freedom of their homeland. Here on 5 and 10 August 1944 in a number of executions, the Hitlerites murdered and burned about 1,400 residents Wola including many schoolchildren"	The plaque commemorates the victims of a massacre perpetrated by the German troops during the Wola massacre. On "Black Saturday," August 5, 1944, in the Hospital of St. Lazarus about 1,200 people were killed (patients, staff members and residents seeking shelter there from Wola). Among the victims were a dozen Girl Scouts of the Emilia Plater squad. Until 2015 the plaque was located on the wall of the house at 53 Karolkowa Street.
KarolkowaS	Karolkowa Street, near the corner with "Solidarności” Avenue	Free-standing	"The place sanctified by the blood of Poles who died for the freedom of their homeland. Here, August 6, 1944 in a mass execution, the Hitlerites shot many Poles"	The plaque commemorates the victims of mass executions carried out by Germans on the second day of the Wola massacre. Near the hospital of St. Lazarus, policemen from Reinefarth's group shot an unknown number of residents of Wola.
Leszno	30 Leszno Street	On a portion of the wall	"The place sanctified by the blood of Poles who died for the freedom of their homeland. On August 6, 1944 in the Karola and Marii Hospital, the Hitlerites shot 100 Poles"	The plaque commemorates the victims of the massacre perpetrated by the German troops during the second day of the Wola massacre. At the Karola and Marii Hospital, 100 to 300 Poles (patients and staff members) were murdered.
Młynarska 2	2 Młynarska Street	Free-standing (in the Wola tram depot)	"The place sanctified by the blood of Poles who died for the freedom of their homeland. Here, the Hitlerites executed 22 October 1943 ten Warsaw tramway workers and 5 August 1944 over a thousand Warsaw tramway workers"	The plaque commemorates the victims of executions carried out in the vicinity of the tram depot during the occupation and the Warsaw Uprising. On October 22, 1943 at 2 Młynarska Street (at the corner with Wolska), Germans conducted a street execution, which executed 17 hostages brought from Pawiak prison. On "Black Saturday", August 5, 1944, about 1,000 residents of Wola (men, women and children) were killed in the depot.
Młynarska 68	68 Młynarska Street, near the corner with Sołtyka Street	On the wall of the Jewish cemetery	"The place of struggle and martyrdom of Poles who died for the freedom of their homeland. Here, in August 1944, the Hitlerites executed residents of neighboring houses"	The plaque commemorates Polish civilians killed during the Wola massacre. Around 7–8 August 1944, Germans shot at least a dozen residents of nearby houses here.
Mszczonowska	3/5 Mszczonowska Street	Free-standing	"The place sanctified by the blood of Poles who died for the freedom of their homeland. Here, on October 16, 1942, the Hitlerites hanged 10 Polish patriots "hostages" for the action to blow up railway tracks"	The plaque commemorates the victims of public executions carried out by the Germans in retaliation for the AK diversionary action directed against the Warsaw railway junction. On October 16, 1942, 50 prisoners from Pawiak prison were hanged at five sites in the city. A nearby plaque is an authentic gallows from the occupation period.
Płocka	25 Płocka Street	On the wall of a building	"The place sanctified by the blood of Poles who died for the freedom of their homeland. Here, in August 1944, the Hitlerites shot about 300 Poles"	The plaque commemorates the victims of mass executions carried out by the Germans during the Wola massacre. In the first days of August 1944, on the premises at 23 and 25 Płocka Street, at least 280 Poles (men, women and children) were executed.
Siedmiogrodzka	5 Siedmiogrodzka Street	On the wall of a building	"The place sanctified by the blood of Poles who died for the freedom of their homeland. Here, in August 1944, the Hitlerites executed more than 500 residents of Will and tram"	The plaque commemorates the site where German soldiers moved 500 Polish civilians (mostly women) from the area of the J. Franaszek factory to the nearby tram depot and then shot them on the "Black Saturday," August 5, 1944.
Solidarności 84	84 "Solidarności” Avenue	Free-standing	"The place sanctified by the blood of Poles who died for the freedom of their homeland. Memory 27 patriots executed by the Hitlerites on 11.II.1944 year"	The plaque commemorates 27 Pawiak prisoners executed in retaliation for the assassination of Franz Kutschera. All the victims were hung on the balconies of the ruined house in front of the court building at Leszno Street.
Solidarności 90	90 "Solidarności” Avenue	On the facade of the Wola District Office	"The place sanctified by the blood of Poles fought freedom. Here dated 16 September 1944, the Hitlerites shot dozens of Poles"	The then Leszno Street was on the route where the exiled population of Warsaw were moved to the rallying point by St. Wojciech's Church, and from there to the West Railway Station. The plaque commemorates the 30 residents of the Old Town, who left the crowd of refugees, and were then shot at this location on September 16, 1944.
Sowińskiego 28	28 Sowińskiego Street	On a portion of the wall	"The place sanctified by the blood of Poles who died for the freedom of their homeland. Here August 1, 1944, the Hitlerites shot 8 Poles"	The plaque commemorates the eight passers-by, arrested and executed by the Germans a few hours before the outbreak of the Warsaw Uprising. The crime was committed in retaliation for an earlier skirmish with a group of AK soldiers.
Towarowa 2	2 Towarowa Street	Free-standing (in front of the Golden Tulip hotel)	"The place sanctified by the blood of Poles who died for the freedom of their homeland. Here on December 31, 1943, the Hitlerites shot 43 Poles"	The plaque commemorates the victims of the street execution conducted in the period when SS-Brigadeführer Franz Kutschera occupied a post of SS and Police Leader of the Warsaw District. On December 31, 1943, several dozen of Pawiak prison inmates were executed in this place. One of the victims was probably Ludomir Marczak, a Polish composer and socialist activist who was arrested for hiding the Jews.
Towarowa 30	30 Towarowa Street, at the corner with Kotlarska Street	Free-standing	"The place sanctified by the blood of Poles who died for the freedom of their homeland. Between 5-6 VIII 1944, the Hitlerites executed here 120 people"	The plaque commemorates the victims of executions carried out by Germans during the Wola massacre. Around August 6, 1944, in the courtyard of a nearby house at 90 Krochmalna Street (now 4 Jaktorowska Street) at least 34 people were killed.
TowarowaŁ	Towarowa Street, near the corner with Łucka Street	Free-standing (on the green belt between tram tracks)	"The place sanctified by the blood of Poles who died for the freedom of their homeland. Here in 1943, the Hitlerites shot about 30 hostages"	The plaque commemorates the victims of the street execution conducted in the period when SS-Brigadeführer Franz Kutschera occupied a post of SS and Police Leader of the Warsaw District. On 30 October 1943 about 10 prisoners of Pawiak prison were executed in this place.
Wolska 2	2/4/6 Wolska Street	Free-standing	"The place sanctified by the blood of Poles who died for the freedom of their homeland. Here, on 7 August 1944, the Hitlerites shot 500 Polish patients from the hospital, doctors and residents of Wola"	The plaque commemorates the victims of mass executions carried out by Germans during the Wola massacre. On 5–10 August 1944, at Fundacji Staszica in front of 2, 4, and 6 Wolska Street about 600 Poles were killed.
Wolska 27	27/29 Wolska Street	On the wall of the Biernackich Palace	"The place sanctified by the blood of Poles who died for the freedom of their homeland. In August 1944, at 29 Wolska Street and at 4/6/8 Wolska Street Hitlerites murdered about 3200 people"	The plaque commemorates the victims of mass executions carried out by Germans during the Wola massacre. Near the Biernackich Palace at least 600 people were executed. Mass executions also took place in the neighboring estates.
Wolska 37	37 Wolska Street	On the wall of the Wojewódzkiego Szpitala Zakaźnego (Provincial Hospital for Infectious Diseases)	"The place sanctified by the blood of Poles who died for the freedom of their homeland. In the period from August 5 to September 1944, the Hitlerites in the hospital numerous murders"	The Wojewódzkiego Szpitala Zakaźnego was the only hospital in the district which escaped killings during the Wola massacre. However, on its premises Germans killed about 20 people. The hospital also served for a time as Oskar Dirlewanger's headquarters. In the courtyard there is a non-Tchorek plaque commemorating the two young rebels hanged by the Germans a few days after the occupation of the hospital.
Wolska 43	43 Wolska Street	On a portion of the wall	"The place sanctified by the blood of Poles who died for the freedom of their homeland. Here August 5, 1944, the Hitlerites executed about 1,000 Poles"	The plaque commemorates the victims of mass executions carried out by Germans during the Wola massacre. Between 5 and 8 August 1944, in the J. Franaszek factory at least 4,000 men, women and children were killed. The plaque is placed on a preserved portion of the factory wall.
Wolska 45	43/45 Wolska Street	On the gable wall of one of the buildings of the former "Foton" factory	"The place sanctified by the blood of Poles who died for the freedom of their homeland. In this place from August 4 to October 15, 1944, the Hitlerites shot and burned about 6,000 residents of Wola"	The plaque on one of the buildings of the former Warszawskich Zakładów Fotochemicznych FOTON factory (in the depths of the property) also commemorates the victims of mass executions carried out during the Wola massacre in the J. Franaszek factory.
Wolska 55	55 Wolska Street	Free-standing (at the intersection with Płocka Street)	"The place sanctified by the blood of Poles who died for the freedom of their homeland. Here on August 5, 1944 in the Ursus factory in place of mass execution, the Hitlerites executed about 7,000 Poles"	The plaque commemorates the victims of mass executions carried out by Germans during the Wola massacre. On "Black Saturday," August 5, 1944, at the "Ursus" factory at least 6,000 Poles were killed. Among the victims were three children of Wanda Lurie.
Wolska 58	58 Wolska Street	On the wall of a building	"The place sanctified by the blood of Poles who died for the freedom of their homeland. Here, August 10, 1944, the Hitlerites shot about 20 Poles"	The plaque commemorates approximately 20 men and women, who the Germans pulled out of a crowd, and then shot them under the wall of a pasta and artificial coffee factory "Bramenco". Five days earlier, on "Black Saturday" August 5, 1944, about 500 residents of Wola were murdered here.
Wolska 68	68/72 Wolska Street	On the wall of the building (facing Syreny Street)	"The place sanctified by the blood of Poles who died for the freedom of their homeland. Here, on 21 and 23 December 1943 in mass executions, the Hitlerites shot many Poles"	The plaque commemorates the victims of the street execution conducted in the period when SS-Brigadeführer Franz Kutschera occupied a post of SS and Police Leader of the Warsaw District. Its inscription contains incorrect information. In fact, the execution of Pawiak prison inmates took place on 18 December 1943 and the exact number of victims is not known.
Wolska 76	74/76 Wolska Street	On the pediment of the St. Adalbert of Prague Church (St. Wojciech's Church)	"The place sanctified by the blood of Poles who died for the freedom of their homeland. In this church during the Warsaw Uprising, Hitlerites camp for evacuated people making mass executions"	Starting from August 6, 1944, the church functioned as Warsaw's main rallying point for the expulsion of the city's population. Near the church, Germans killed about 400 people.
Wolska 77	77/81 Wolska Street	Free-standing	"The place sanctified by the blood of Poles who died for the freedom of their homeland. Here 6 and 8 August 1944, the Hitlerites executed about 4,000 Poles - the insurgents and residents of neighboring houses"	The plaque commemorates the victims of mass executions carried out by Germans during the Wola massacre. On August 6, 1944 in the nearby Kirchmajera and Marczewskiego factory at least 2,000 Poles were executed. Among the victims were 30 Redemptorists from the monastery at 49 Karolkowej.
Wolska 102	102/104 Wolska Street	Free-standing	"The place sanctified by the blood of Poles who died for the freedom of their homeland. Place a martyr's death in 2500 the inhabitants of the surrounding houses, killed in the first days of August 1944"	The plaque commemorates the victims of the massacre perpetrated by the German troops during the Wola massacre. On "Black Saturday," August 5, 1944 in the "Domów Hankiewicza" at 105/109 Wolska Street, 2,000 men, women and children were killed. Across the street, Germans murdered another few hundred people (residents of houses at 100 and 102/104 Wolska Street).
Wolska 138	138/140 Wolska Street	Free-standing (on the side of the Orthodox church of St. Jan Klimak)	"The place sanctified by the blood of Poles who died for the freedom of their homeland. Here August 5, 1944, the Hitlerites executed 60 people, and the cemetery burned about 1,500 corpses of murdered inhabitants of Wola "	The plaque commemorates the victims of mass executions carried out by Germans during the Wola massacre. On "Black Saturday," August 5, 1944, at the side of the Orthodox cemetery dozens of people were shot, including Archimandrite Teofan Protasiewicz and other clergy and residents of the parish house. Germans also committed mass crimes at the cemetery and the Orthodox orphanage at 149 Wolska Street.
Wolska 140	138/140 Wolska Street	Free-standing (in the Orthodox cemetery)	"The place sanctified by the martyrdom of Poles who died for the freedom of their homeland. Here August 5, 1944, the Hitlerites burned the corpses of murdered about 1,500 residents of Wola"	The plaque commemorates the place of the mass cremation of the victims of the Wola massacre.
Wolska 140A	140A Wolska Street	On the wall at the gate of the St. Lawrence's Church	"The place sanctified by the blood of Poles who died for the freedom of their homeland. At the beginning of August 1944, the Hitlerites staged several mass executions here for insurgents and civilians"	The plaque commemorates the victims of mass executions carried out by Germans during the Wola massacre. Between 5 and 8 August 1944, in the area of St. Lawrence's Church, several hundred Poles (men, women and children) were murdered. Among the victims was Father Mieczysław Krygier and the wounded from the hospital in the basement of the church.
Wronia	45 Wronia Street	On a portion of the wall	"The place sanctified by the blood of Poles who died for the freedom of their homeland. In the days of the Warsaw Uprising, the Hitlerites made in this place numerous executions of civilians"	The historical sources lack information on the events on the plaque.
Żelazna 87	87/89 Żelazna Street	On the wall of a building	"The place sanctified by the blood of Poles who died for the freedom of their homeland. Here in September 1944 in mass executions, the Hitlerites shot about 350 Poles"	The plaque commemorates the victims of executions carried out by Germans during the Warsaw Uprising. Żelazna Street was part of the route through which people exiled from the Old Town and Powiśle were sent to the rallying point at St. Wojciech's Church, and from there to the West Railway Station. In September 1944, there were summary executions of refugees, which could have killed more than 500 Poles.
Żelazna 103	103 Żelazna Street	On the wall of a building	"Honor to their memory. In this house in 1943, the Gestapo tortured in the dungeons to death thousands of Jews of the Warsaw Ghetto"	The plaque commemorates the place which in the summer of 1942 was the headquarters of the Befehlstelle, directing the deportation of inhabitants of the Warsaw ghetto to the Treblinka extermination camp. Germans also used this building as a detention centre and a place of executions.

=== Żoliborz ===
Picture	Location	Type	Inscription	Commemorated event
Duchnicka	3 Duchnicka Street	Free-standing in the courtyard of the Instytut Mechaniki Precyzyjnej (Institute of Precision Mechanics)	"Place of the Polish fight for the freedom of their homeland. Commemoration activities in the factory gauges Polish Workers' Party and the freedom fighters who were murdered by the Hitlerites in the years 1943-1944"	Before and during the Second World War, this building housed an Arms industry factory (Państwowa Fabryka Sprawdzianów Wytwórni Uzbrojenia w Warszawie). The plaque commemorates the members of the communist Polish Workers' Party (PPR), who conducted underground activities in this factory during the German occupation of Poland. In April 1943, the Gestapo arrested 20 Polish workers on charges of sabotage. Among the detainees was the secretary of the local PPR's cell, Puchała (who was later executed).
Gdańska	4A Gdańska Street	On the wall of the building (by J.Ch. Paska Street)	"The place sanctified by the blood of Poles who died for the freedom of their homeland. In the yard of the house on Sept. 15, 1944, the Hitlerites shot 100 residents of nearby houses brutally murdering children"	The plaque commemorates the victims of the war crime committed by the German troops during the Warsaw Uprising. On September 15, 1944, in the house at 4A Gdańska Street, German soldiers murdered at least 30 Poles. Among the victims were women and children.
Krasińskiego	Krasińskiego Street, at the corner with Popiełuszki Street	Free-standing	"Place where Poles fight for the freedom of their homeland. In this region branches Żoliborz AL and AK bloody battles fought together against the Hitler's invader in August and September 1944, during the Warsaw Uprising"	The plaque commemorates the place, where fierce fighting took place during the Warsaw Uprising. Neighbouring monastery and school of the Sisters of the Resurrection, so-called "Fortress of the Sisters of the Resurrection" (Twierdza Zmartwychwstanek) was then one of the most important insurgent's strongholds at Żoliborz. Soldiers of the AK and AL defended the monastery and school till September 29, 1944.
Lutosławskiego 9	9 Lutosławskiego Street	On the wall of a building	"The place sanctified by the blood of Poles who died for the freedom of their homeland. On this street, from 15 to 30 September 1944, the Hitlerites executed more than 100 civilians"	The plaque commemorates the victims of the war crime committed by German troops during the Warsaw Uprising. On September 14, 1944, after the fall of Marymont, German soldiers executed at least 40 Polish civilians who tried to find the shelter in the basement of the house at 2/4 Dembińskiego Street (nowadays Lutosławskiego Street).
Kaskada	Kaskada park	On a portion of the wall (near the intersection of Kolektorska Street and Trószyńskiego Street)	"The place sanctified by the blood of Poles who died for the freedom of their homeland. At this point, September 14, 1944, the Hitlerites executed 40 civilians"	The plaque commemorates the victims of mass executions conducted by German troops during the Warsaw Uprising. On September 14, 1944, after the fall of Marymont, near the building which was inhabited by the employees of the Municipal Water Supply and Sewerage Company, German soldiers executed around 40 Poles. Among the victims was Olga Przyłęcka who is mentioned by the inscription painted on the wall, near the Tchorek plaque.
Barszczewska	4A Potocka Street	On a portion of the wall	"The place sanctified by the blood of Poles who died for the freedom of their homeland. In this place on September 15, 1944, the Hitlerites executed 50 civilians"	The plaque commemorates the victims of the war crime committed by German soldiers during the Warsaw Uprising. On September 14, 1944, after the fall of Marymont, at least 10 Polish men were executed at the intersection of Barszczewska Street and Morawska Street (the latter is currently non-existent). The plaque was previously located at 19 Barszczewska Street, at the wall of Małkowskich tenement house. This building, however, was demolished in 2016. The plaque is currently installed on a fragment of the wall, which is integrated into the fence of the Potocka 4A housing building.

== Examples of lost Tchorek plaques ==
- 137 Czerniakowska Street (monastery of the Sisters of Nazareth) – the plaque commemorated the fierce battles fought in the area during the Warsaw Uprising. On 27–28 August 1944, soldiers of the AK "Baszta” (Tower) regiment mastered the strong point of resistance in the monastery complex of the Sisters of Nazareth, which was one of the elements of the German barrier separating downtown from the insurgent Mokotów. In 1996 the plaque was replaced by a new type of Tchorek plaque which described more specifically the commemorated events and the role played in them by the AK "Baszta”.
- Kopińska Street (next to the tunnel by the West Railway Station (Warszawa Zachodnia)) – the plaque commemorated the victims of the street execution conducted in the period when SS-Brigadeführer Franz Kutschera occupied a post of SS and Police Leader of the Warsaw District. On 17 November 1943, several dozen of Pawiak prison inmates were executed in this place. The plaque was accidentally destroyed during the reconstruction of the track. Currently, victims of execution are commemorated by a new type of plaque, set on Jerozolimskie Avenue near the West Railway Station.
- Krakowska Avenue, at the corner with Materii Street – a plaque commemorated the AK soldiers killed in the second day of the Warsaw Uprising. On August 2, 1944, the Germans surrounded, and then set fire to the house at 175 Krakowska Avenue. In the flames or by German bullets, 50 soldiers and several nurses were killed. In 1992 the plaque was replaced with a cross.
