= Karol Tchorek =

Polish sculptor

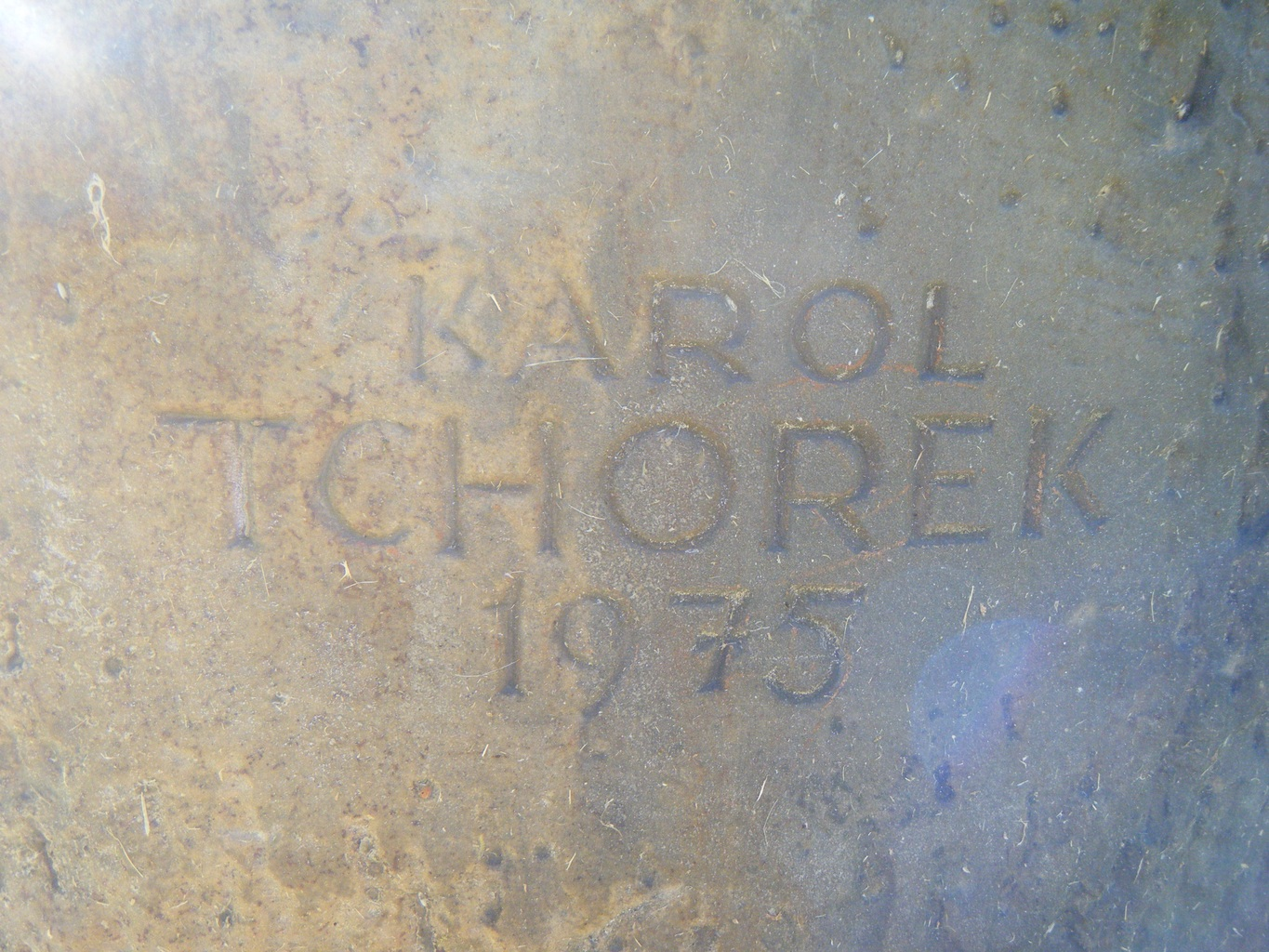
- The artist's signature on the sculpture, Warsaw Autumn
- Born: 30 October 1904; Serock
- Died: 10 April 1985 (aged 80); Warsaw
- Known for: Sculptor

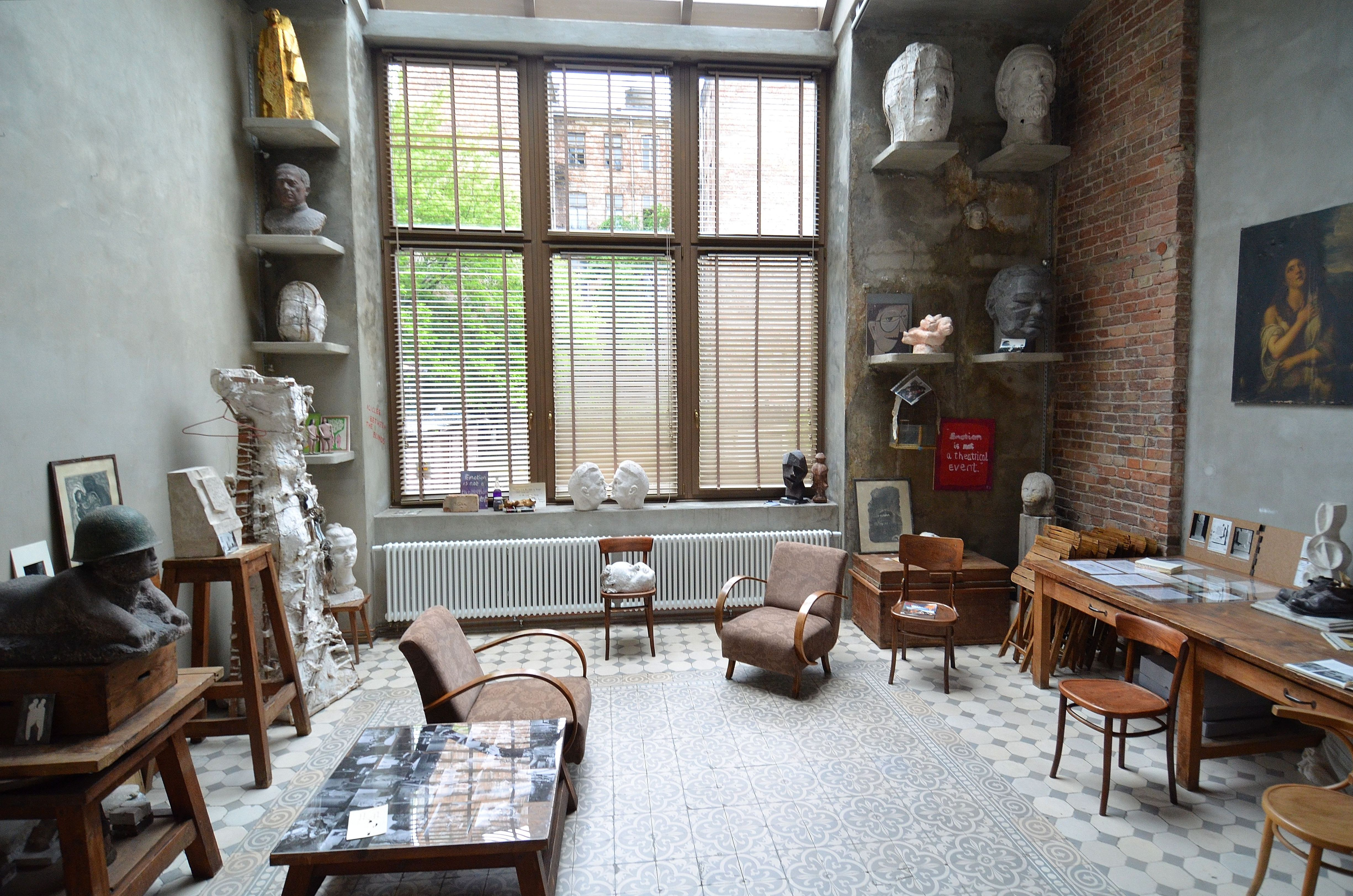
Karol Tchorek's studio on Smolna Street in Warsaw

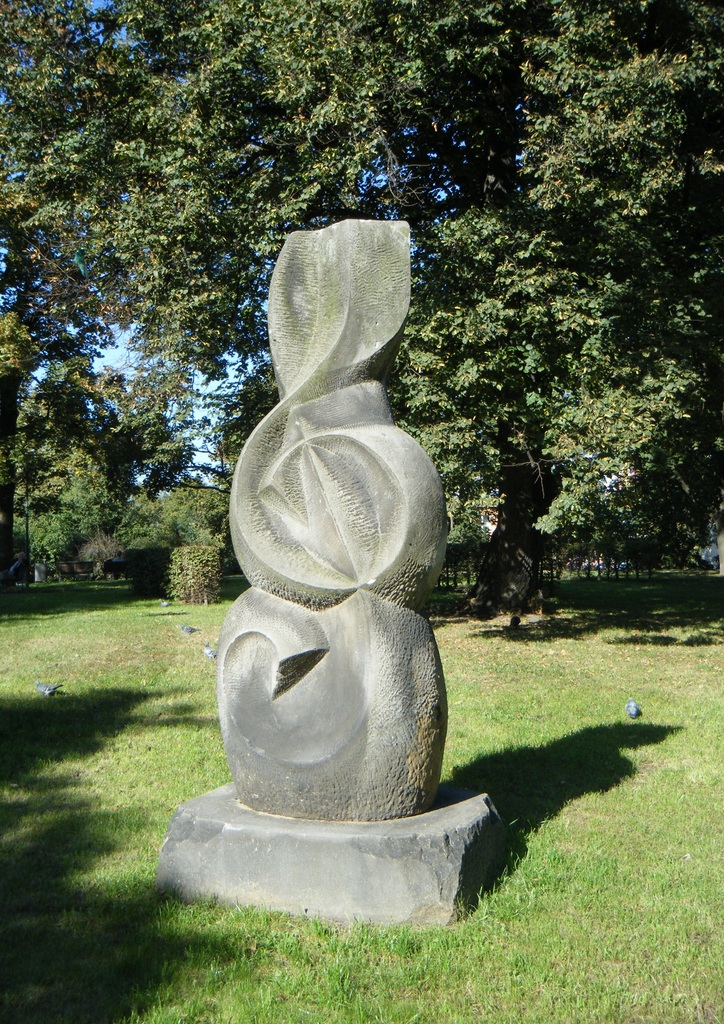
Warszawska jesień (Warsaw Autumn) (1975)

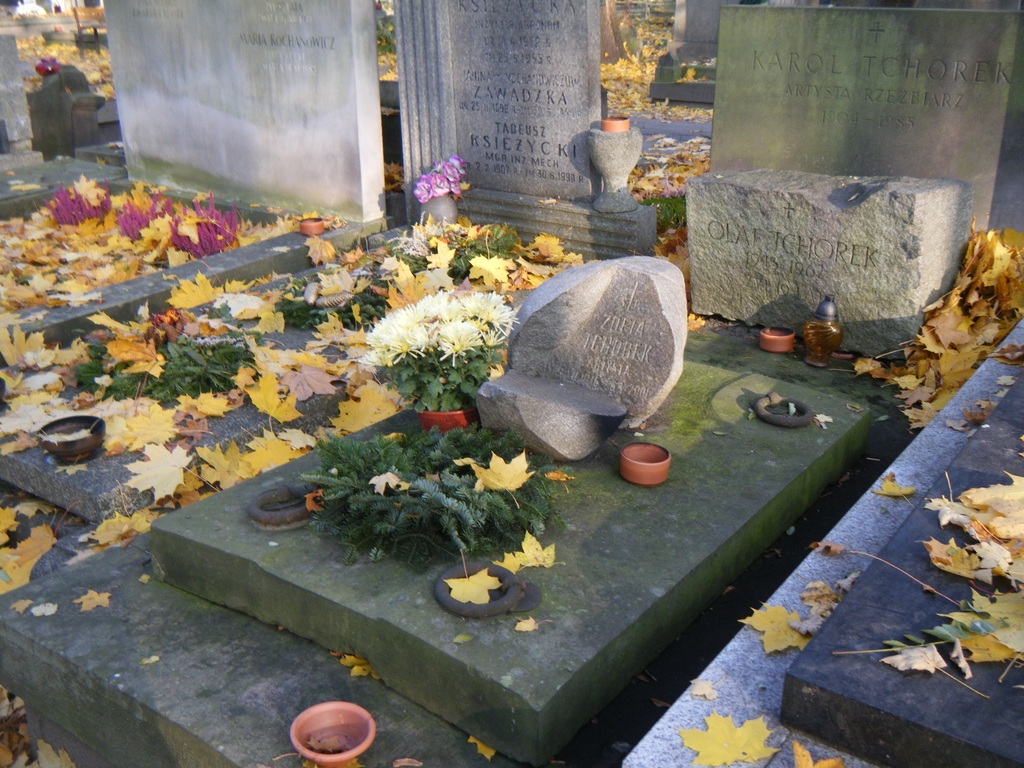
Karol Tchorek's tomb in the Powązki Cemetery

Karol Tchorek (born 30 October 1904, in Serock, died 10 April 1985, in Warsaw) was a Polish sculptor, art dealer and art collector. The designer of monuments, an activist in the ZPAP, and winner, among other awards, of the Polish Order of Polonia Restituta.

== Biography ==
Tchorek was born on October 30, 1904, in Serock, Poland. He came from a poor peasant family and his general education ended quickly. At the age of 15, as a volunteer, he took part in the Polish–Soviet War.

In his youth, he worked as a sandblaster on the Vistula River. His artistic education began at the Municipal School of Decorative Arts and Painting in Warsaw, and continued at the capital's School of Fine Arts (Szkoła Sztuk Pięknych). His teachers included sculptors Jan Szczepkowski and Tadeusz Breyer. From 1929, he was a member of the Cooperative Sculptural Form (Spółdzielni Rzeźbiarskiej Forma). He collaborated with the Society for the Promotion of Industry People (Towarzystwem Popierania Przemysłu Ludowego), and also began collecting Kurpian cutouts. In 1932 he was given a grant from the National Culture Fund (Funduszu Kultury Narodowej). His work was also part of the sculpture event in the art competition at the 1932 Summer Olympics. In 1937 he designed the sarcophagus for former Polish leader Józef Piłsudski.

During World War II, two of his studios were destroyed - one in the Warsaw suburb of Powiśle and the other in the town of Brok. He lost his home and also the gallery he ran from 1943 to 1944: the Art Salon Nike. His work continued from 1945 to 1951. Nike was a de facto merger of a private art gallery with an informal antique shop. In 1945 he took part in the General Assembly of Delegates of ZPAP in Kraków, and he became the secretary of the Presidium of its board. He held this position from 1945 to 1946. During this time, he also helped folk sculptor Leon Kudła, whose works he collected. In later years he held senior positions in the Sculpture Section of ZPAP's Warsaw district.

In 1949, Tchorek won a competition for the design of plaques commemorating public executions in Warsaw during World War II. To this day, in Warsaw, there are over 160 plaques designed by the artist still remaining. In 1952, he took part in work on the Marszałkowska Residential District, which resulted in the creation of relief Macierzyństwo (Motherhood) at Marszałkowska Street in Warsaw. From 1959 he made a monument for soldiers and guerrillas in Ostrów Mazowiecka. In 1970, he made a monument to Polish soldiers in the Scottish city Perth, and in 1975, he designed the sculpture Warszawska jesień (Warsaw Autumn), which is located on the Bohdan Wodiczko square behind the Fryderyk Chopin University of Music in Warsaw.

Tchorek married Zofia Kochanowiczów. They had two children - Mariusz and Olaf. After World War II, the family lived at ul. Miedzeszyński in Saska Kępa, Warsaw.

== Selected works ==
- 1937 - Design of Polish leader Józef Piłsudski's sarcophagus
- 1949 - Tchorek plaques, commemorating struggle and martyrdom in WWII
- 1952 - Macierzyństwo (Motherhood)
- 1959 - A monument to the soldiers and guerrillas in Ostrów Mazowiecka
- 1962 - The tombstone of the avant-garde painter Władysław Strzemiński
- 1965 - The tombstone of the sculptor Jan Szczepkowski
- 1970 - A monument to Polish soldiers in Perth (United Kingdom)
- 1975 - Warszawska jesień (The Warsaw Autumn)

== Tchorek plaques ==
As the winner of a nationwide contest in 1948, Tchorek became the designer of plaques commemorating the places of execution during World War II in Warsaw. The city placed around 200 plaques made according to his designs from 1949 onwards in places where executions and fighting had taken place. Some of them contain incorrect details so the Council for the Protection of Memory of Combat and Martyrdom had to intervene, although some are still incorrect.

== Selected exhibitions ==
- X Salon. Malarstwo, grafika, rzeźba, 1938
- I Ogólnopolska Wystawa Plastyki (1st National Exhibition of Fine Arts)
- II Ogólnopolska Wystawa Plastyki (2nd National Exhibition of Fine Arts)
- III Ogólnopolska Wystawa Plastyki (3rd National Exhibition of Fine Arts)
- Plastycy w walce o pokój (Plastic surgery in the struggle for peace), 1950
- Rzeźba warszawska (Statue of Warsaw), 1945-1958
- Rzeźba polska (Polish Sculpture), 1945-1960
- Rzeźba w XV-lecie PRL (Sculpture in the 15th anniversary of the Polish People's Republic)
- XX lat Ludowego Wojska Polskiego w twórczości plastycznej (20 years of the Polish Army in his art)
- Rzeźbiarze Saskiej Kępy wczoraj i dziś (Sculptors Saska Kepa yesterday and today), 2011
- Sztuka wszędzie. Akademia Sztuk Pięknych w Warszawie 1904-1944 (Art everywhere. Academy of Fine Arts in Warsaw, 1904-1944), 2012

== Honours ==
- Medal of the 10th Anniversary of People's Poland (1955)
- Silver Cross of Merit (1955)
- Bronze Medal "Medal of Merit for National Defence" (1966)
- Order of Polonia Restituta (1980)

== Commemoration ==
In Serock, the hometown of the sculptor, there is a street named after him (Karola Tchorka Street).

In 1990, his studio at Smolna Street was entered in the register of monuments and his legacy is looked after by the Fundacja Tchorek-Bentall whose founder is the artist Katy Bentall, widow of Mariusz Tchorek, the son of the sculptor.

== Gallery ==
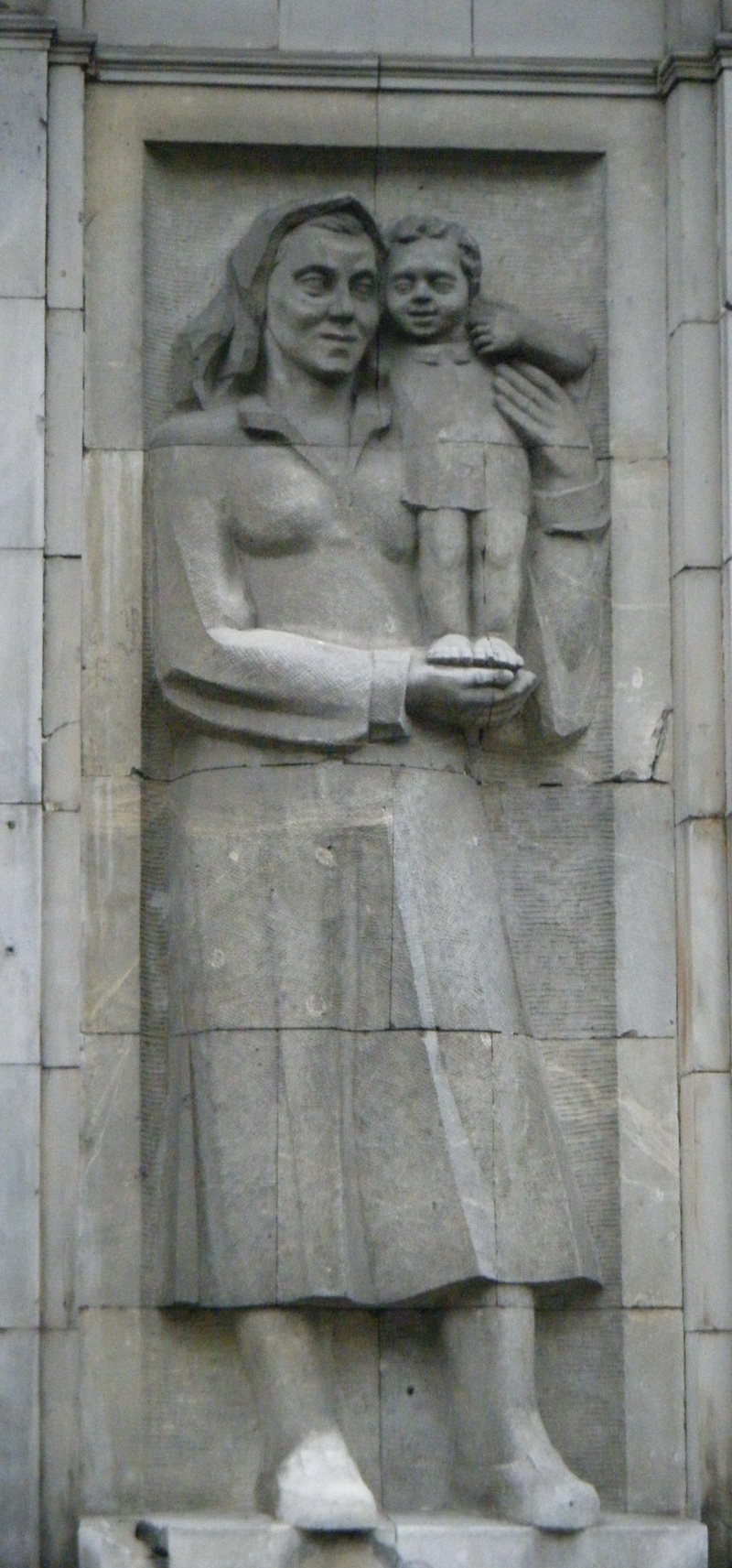
Macierzyństwo (Motherhood) in Warsaw (1952)

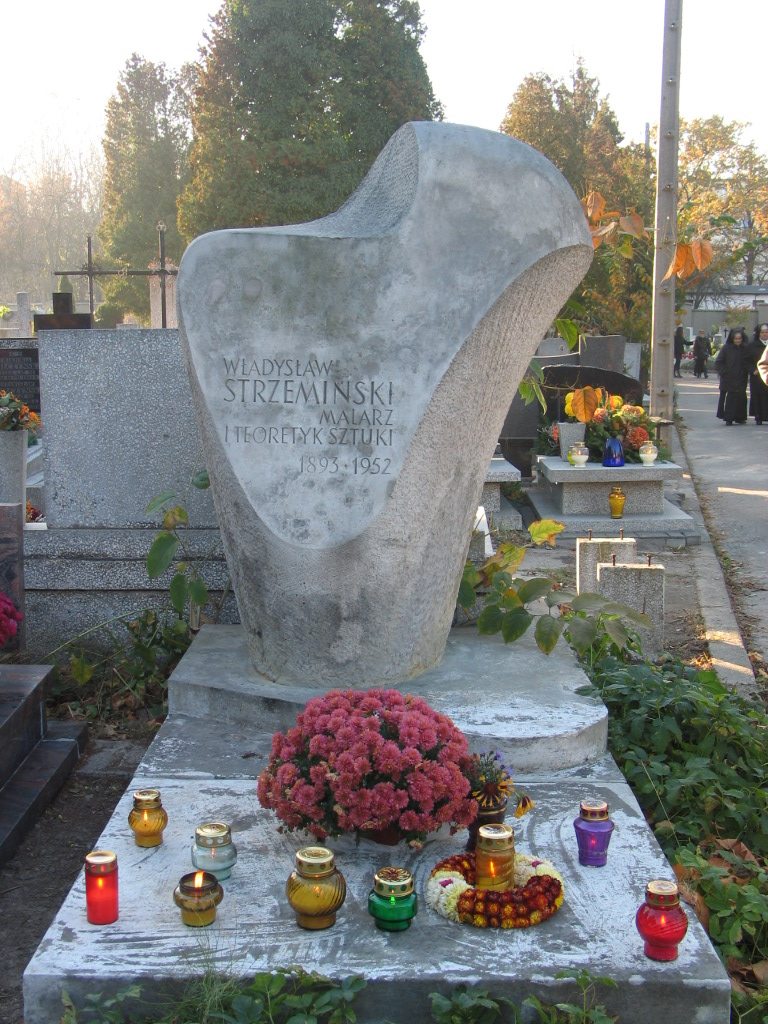
The tombstone of painter Władysław Strzemiński in Łódź (1962)

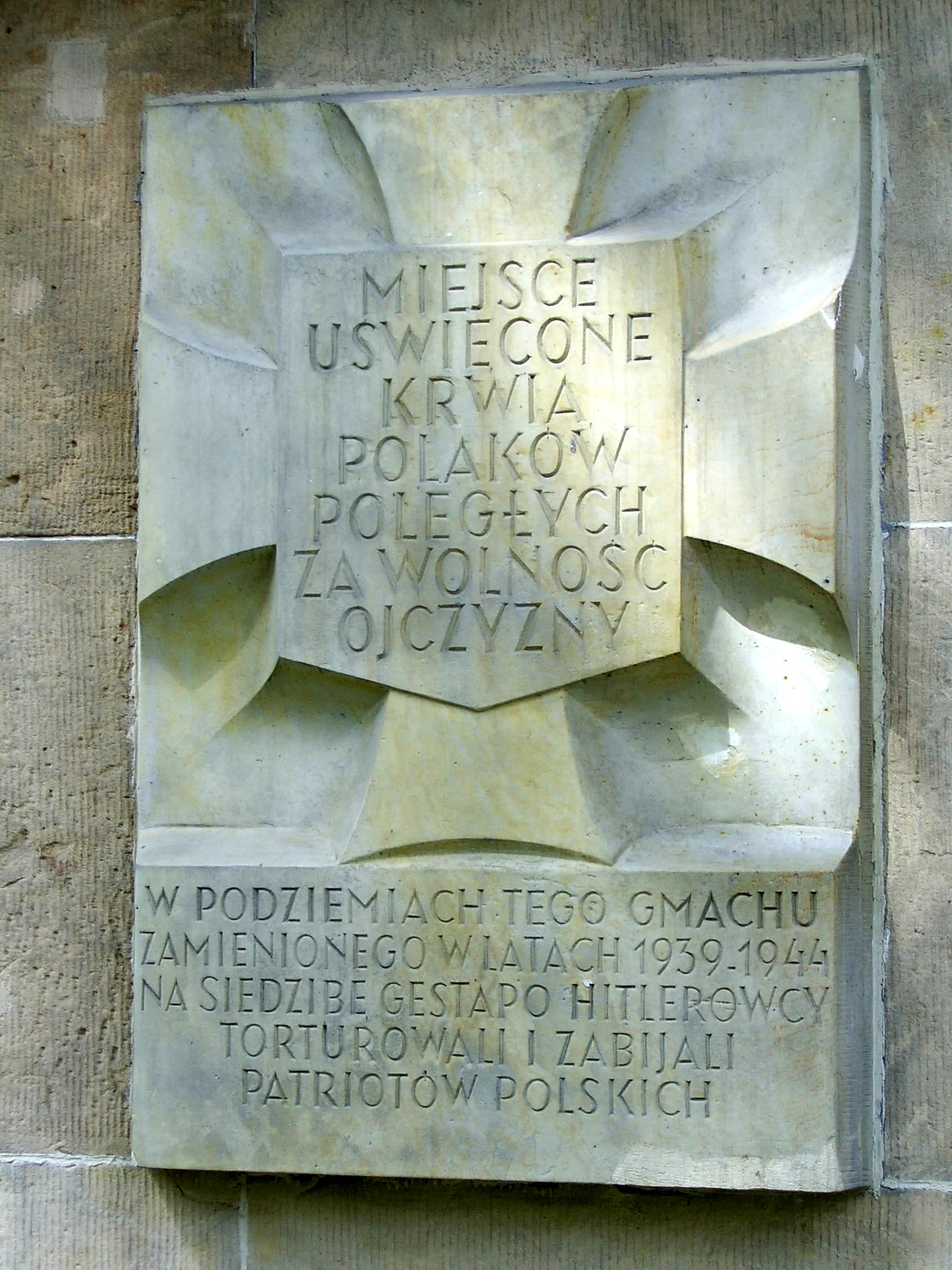
Plaque outside the former Gestapo headquarters at al. Jana Chrystiana Szucha 25 in Warsaw

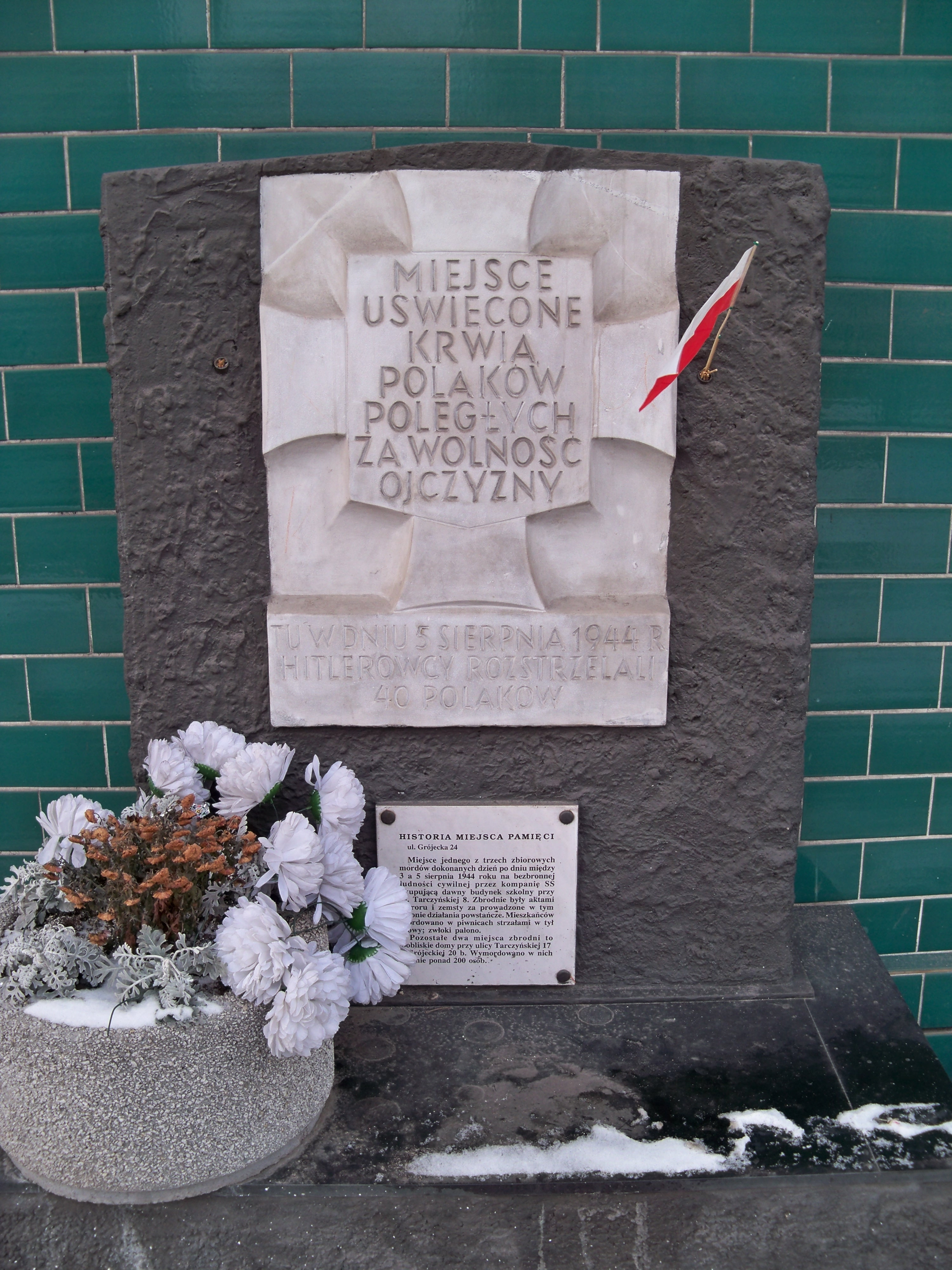
Plaque at ul. Grójecka in Warsaw

== Bibliography ==
- Agnieszka Chmielewska: Karol Tchorek, czyli o pożytkach płynących z uprawiania biografistyki. W: Katarzyna Chrudzimska-Uhera, Bartłomiej Gutowski: Rzeźba w Polsce (1945-2008). T. XIII. Orońsko: Centrum Rzeźby Polskiej, 2008, seria: Rocznik "Rzeźba polska". ISBN 978-83-85901-71-6.
- Ella Chmielewska: Niepamięć w upamiętnianiu: szczególność miejsc traumy a typowość pamięci w ikonosferze Warszawy. W: Katarzyna Chrudzimska-Uhera, Bartłomiej Gutowski: Rzeźba w Polsce (1945-2008). T. XIII. Orońsko: Centrum Rzeźby Polskiej, 2008, seria: Rocznik "Rzeźba polska". ISBN 978-83-85901-71-6.
- Ella Chmielewska, Agnieszka Chmielewska, Mariusz Tchorek, Paul Carter. A Warsaw address: a dossier on 36 Smolna Street. "The Journal of Architecture." 15, pp. 7–38, 2010. London: Routledge.
