= Good Maharaja Square =

Garden square in Warsaw, Poland

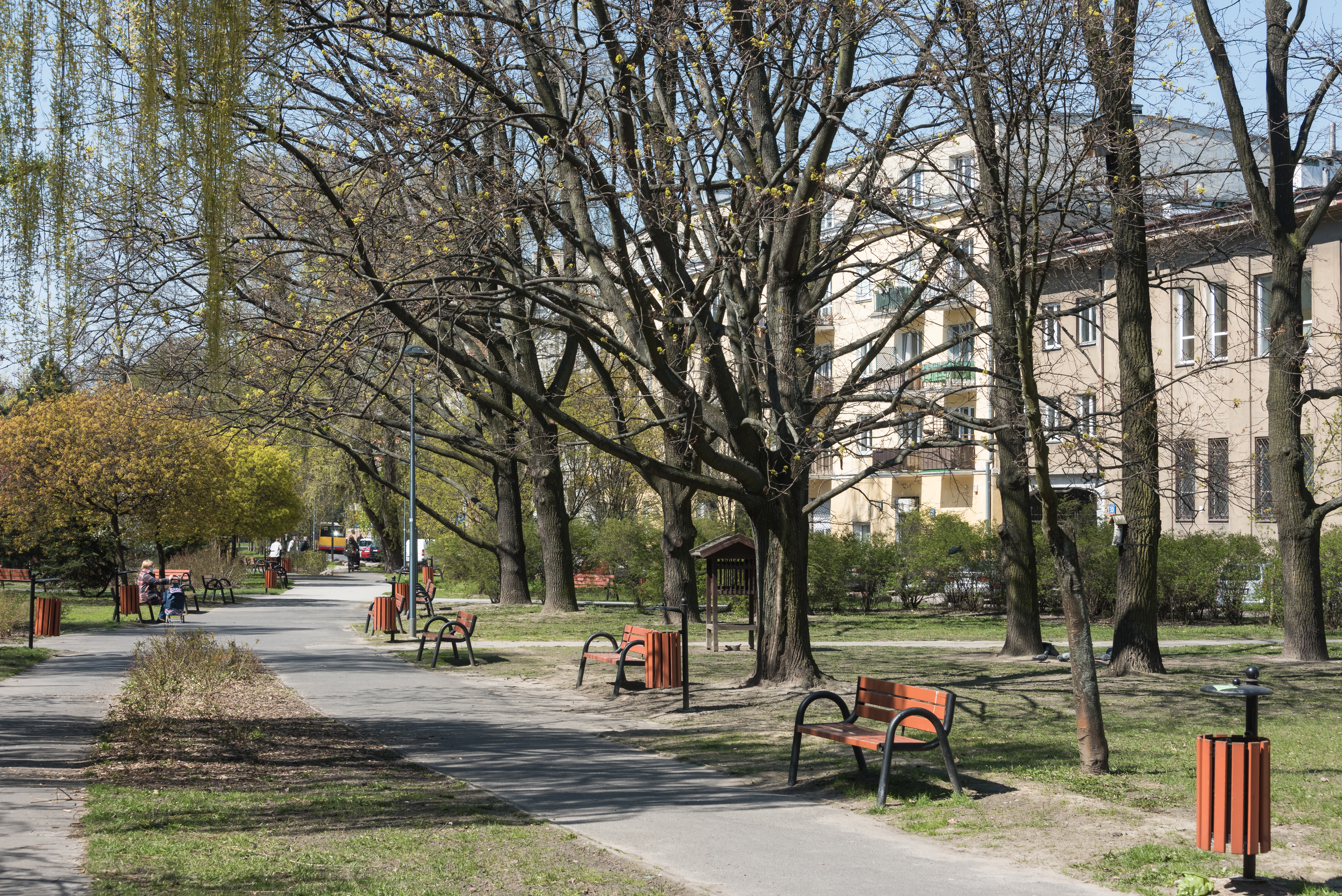
- The garden square in 2021.
- Interactive map of Good Maharaja Square
- Type: Garden square
- Location: Ochota, Warsaw, Poland
- Coordinates: 52.210432°N 20.970909°E
- Area: c. 3 ha
- Created: 31 May 2012

The Good Maharaja Square (Polish: Skwer Dobrego Maharadży), also known as the Opacz Park (Polish pronunciation: [ˈɔpat͡ʂ]; Polish: Park Opaczewski), is a garden square in Warsaw, Poland, located in the district of Ochota, between Grójecka, Opaczewska, and Szczęśliwicka Streets.

== Name ==
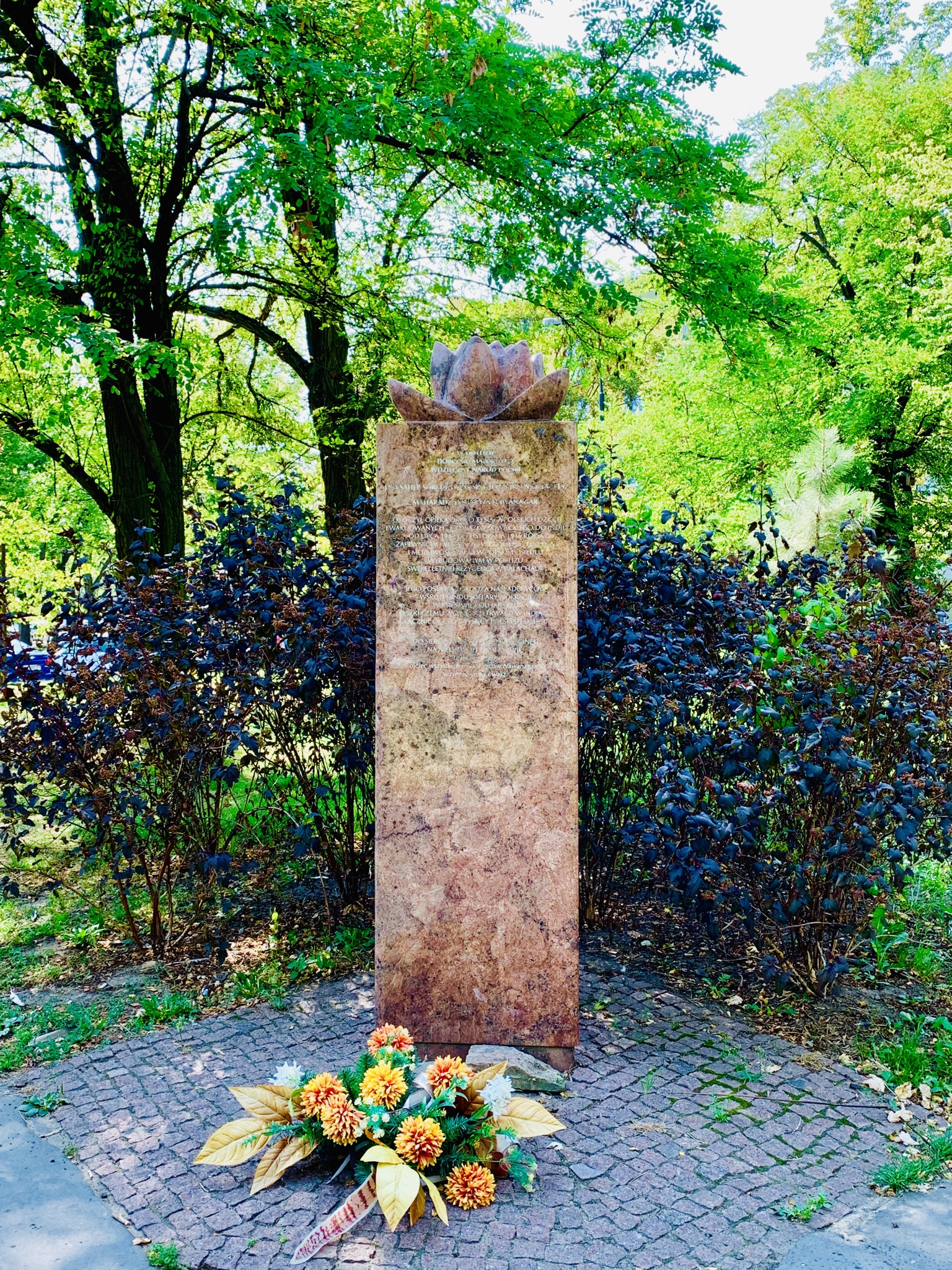
The monument dedicated to Digvijaysinhji Ranjitsinhji Jadeja.

The Good Maharaja Square (Polish: Skwer Dobrego Maharadży) was named after Digvijaysinhji Ranjitsinhji Jadeja, the Maharaja Jam Sahib of Nawanagar State in modern-day India. Jadeja is personally credited for saving around a thousand Polish orphans between 1942 and 1946, following the Invasion of Poland. He also convinced several other Indian rulers to contribute to the efforts. As such, he is referred to in Poland as the Good Maharaja (Polish: Dobry Maharadża).

The name was officially given on 31 May 2012. It was chosen, due to the square's proximity to the nearby school, which in 1991 housed the first reunion of the Polish children refugees from India. The name was proposed to honour the request made by Digvijaysinhji Ranjitsinhji Jadeja, to have one of streets in Warsaw named after himself.

It is also alternatively referred to as the Opacz Park (Polish: Park Opaczewski), after the nearby Opaczewska Street (Polish: Ulica Opaczewska; lit. Opacz Street). It in turn was named after Opacz Wielka, a neighbourhood located to the south.

In 2021, a neighbouring garden square at the intersection of Opaczewska and Białobrzeska Streets, was named the Angel Land Square (Polish: Skwer Ziemi Aniołów). The name came from Angyalföld, a neighbourhood in the 13th district of Budapest, Hungary, which has a cooperation partnership with Ochota since 1993. It was also done in gratitude to one of garden squares in the 13th district of Budapest, being named Ochota Park in 2019.

== History ==
On 8 September 1939, during the siege of Warsaw, Polish Armed Forces constructed a barricade at the intersection of Opaczewska and Grójecka Streets, next to the current park. It was used as defensive position in the fight against the German Wehrmacht. It was commemorated with a monument, designed by Julian Pałka, and unveiled at the location on 12 September 1979.

The garden square was renovated in the 1990s. It received its name on 31 May 2012. On 31 October 2014, near the intersection of Białobrzeska and Opaczewska Streets, was unveiled a marble monument dedicated to the square namesake, Digvijaysinhji Ranjitsinhji Jadeja, nicknamed the Good Maharaja. It was designed by Marek Moderau.

On 21 August 2024, the square was visited by Narendra Modi, the Prime Minister of India, who laid flowers in front of the monument of Good Maharaja.

== Characteristics ==
Opacz Park is placed between both sides of Opaczewska Street, and has a form of a thin and long strach of land, between Grójecka and Szczęśliwicka Streets. It has the total area of around 3 ha. It is surrounded by midrise residential housing.

Near the intersection of Białobrzeska and Opaczewska Streets, is placed a red marble monument dedicated to the square namesake, Digvijaysinhji Ranjitsinhji Jadeja, nicknamed the Good Maharaja. It was designed by Marek Moderau, and consists of a sculpture of Indian lotus, a symbol from Indian religious iconography, placed on a triangular column, with inspirations in Polish, Hindi, and English. It is around 2 m tall.

The Good Maharaja Square neighbours the Angel Land Square (Polish: Skwer Ziemi Aniołów), a small garden square at the northern side of the intersection of Opaczewska and Białobrzeska Streets.

Next to the park is placed the September Barricade Monument, commemorating a barricade that stood there during the siege of Warsaw. It consists of three large concrete sculpture, placed on both sides, and in the middle, of Grójecka Street. They depicts numerals 8-IX (8 September), the day barricade was erected, 1939, the year of the siege, and 27-IX (27 September), the day the city capitulated. Additionally, at the souther side of the intersection of Opaczewska and Białobrzeska Streets, is placed a sandstone sculpture Tribute to Motherhood (Polish: W hołdzie macierzyństwu) made by unknown artist. It depicts a pregnant woman.

== Gallery ==
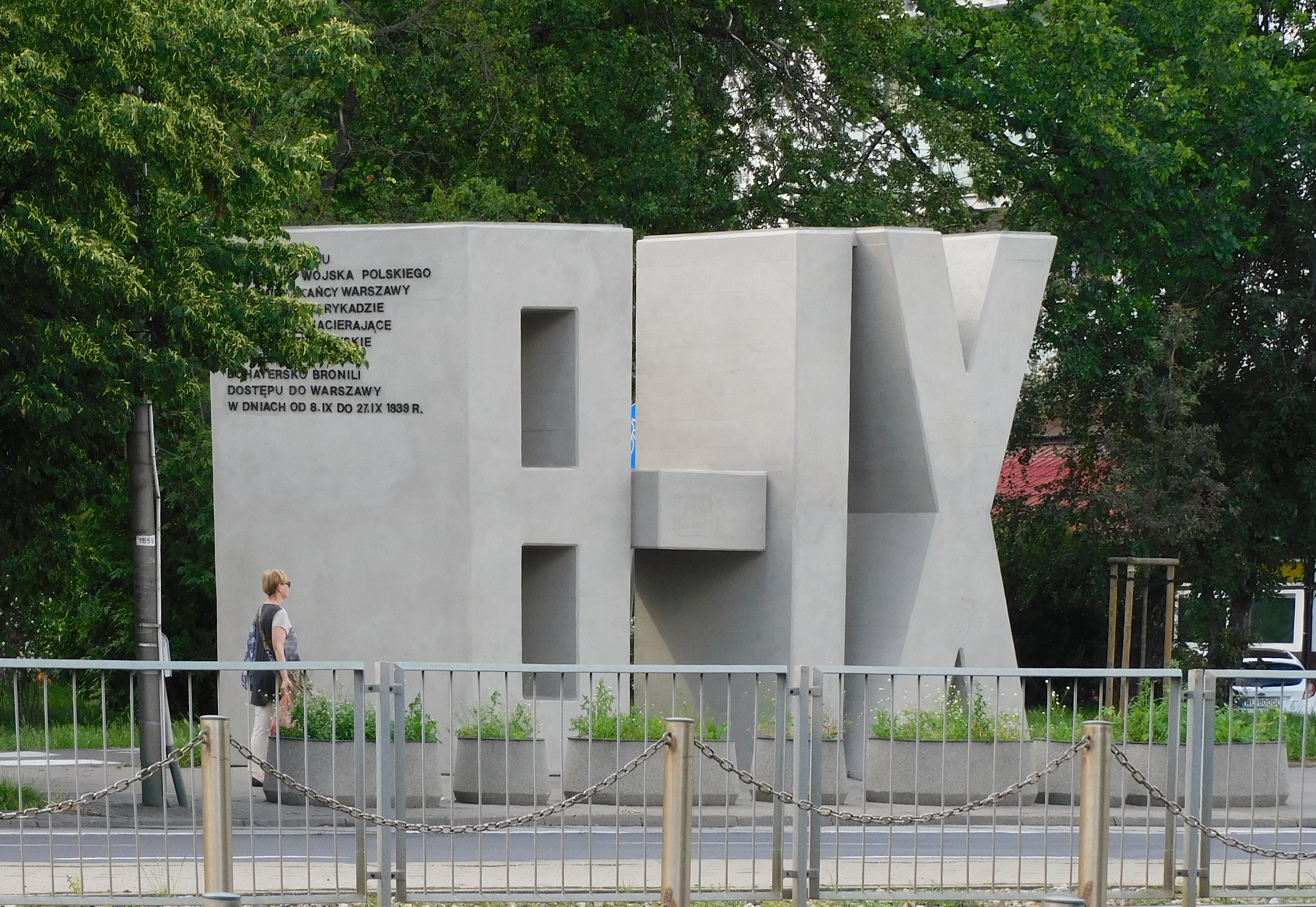
The left part of the September Barricade Monument.

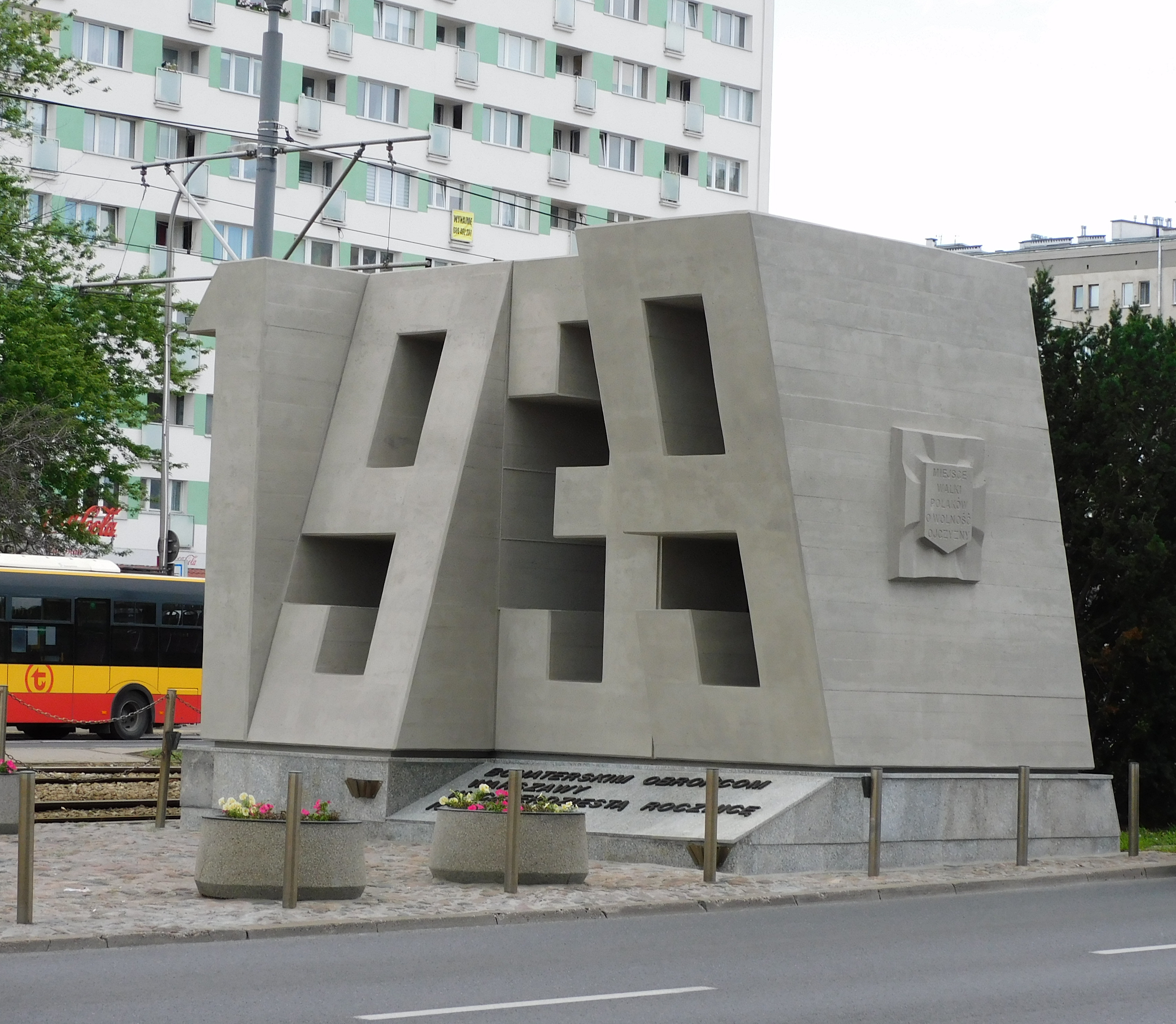
The middle part of the September Barricade Monument

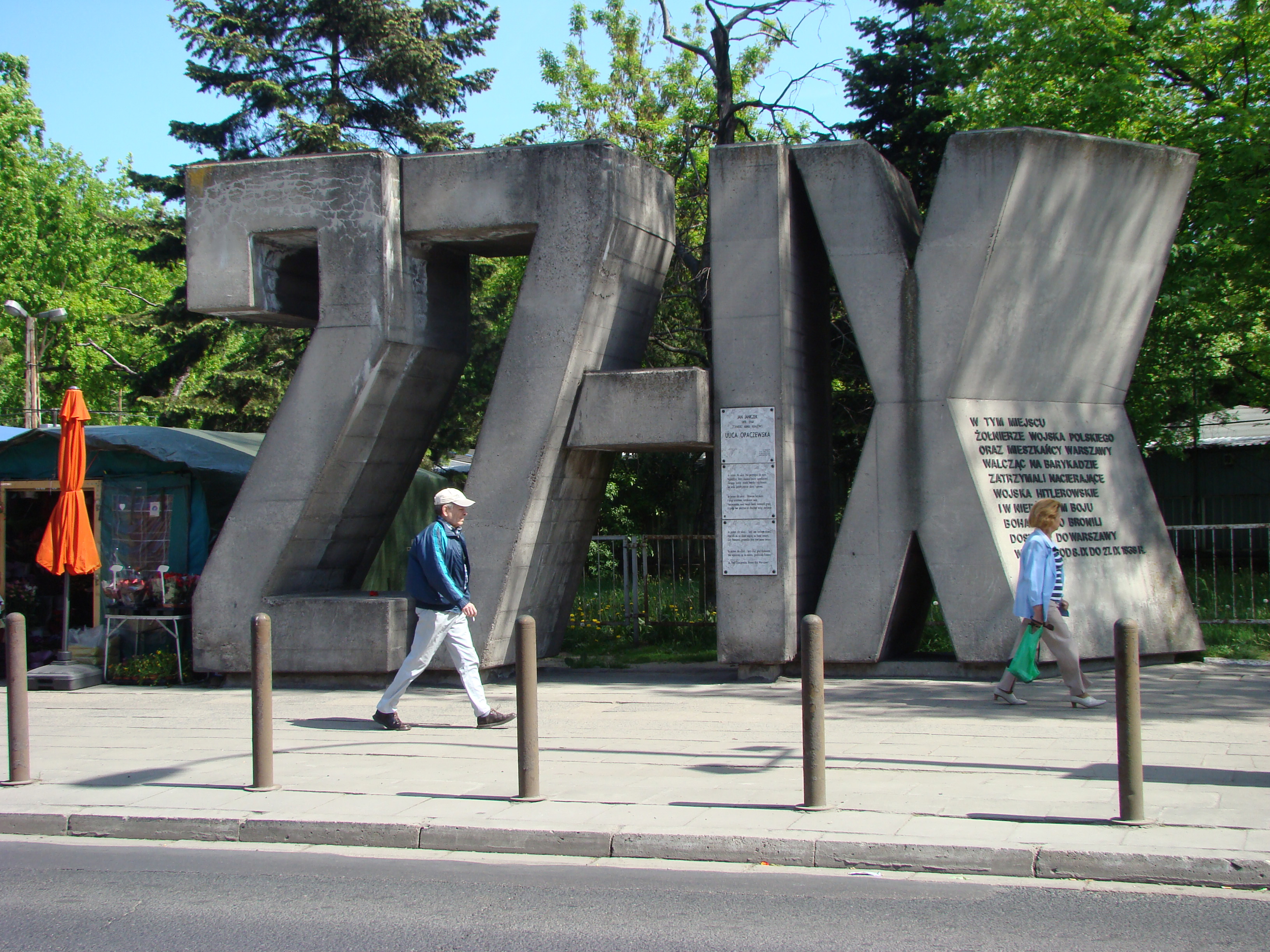
The left right of the September Barricade Monument.

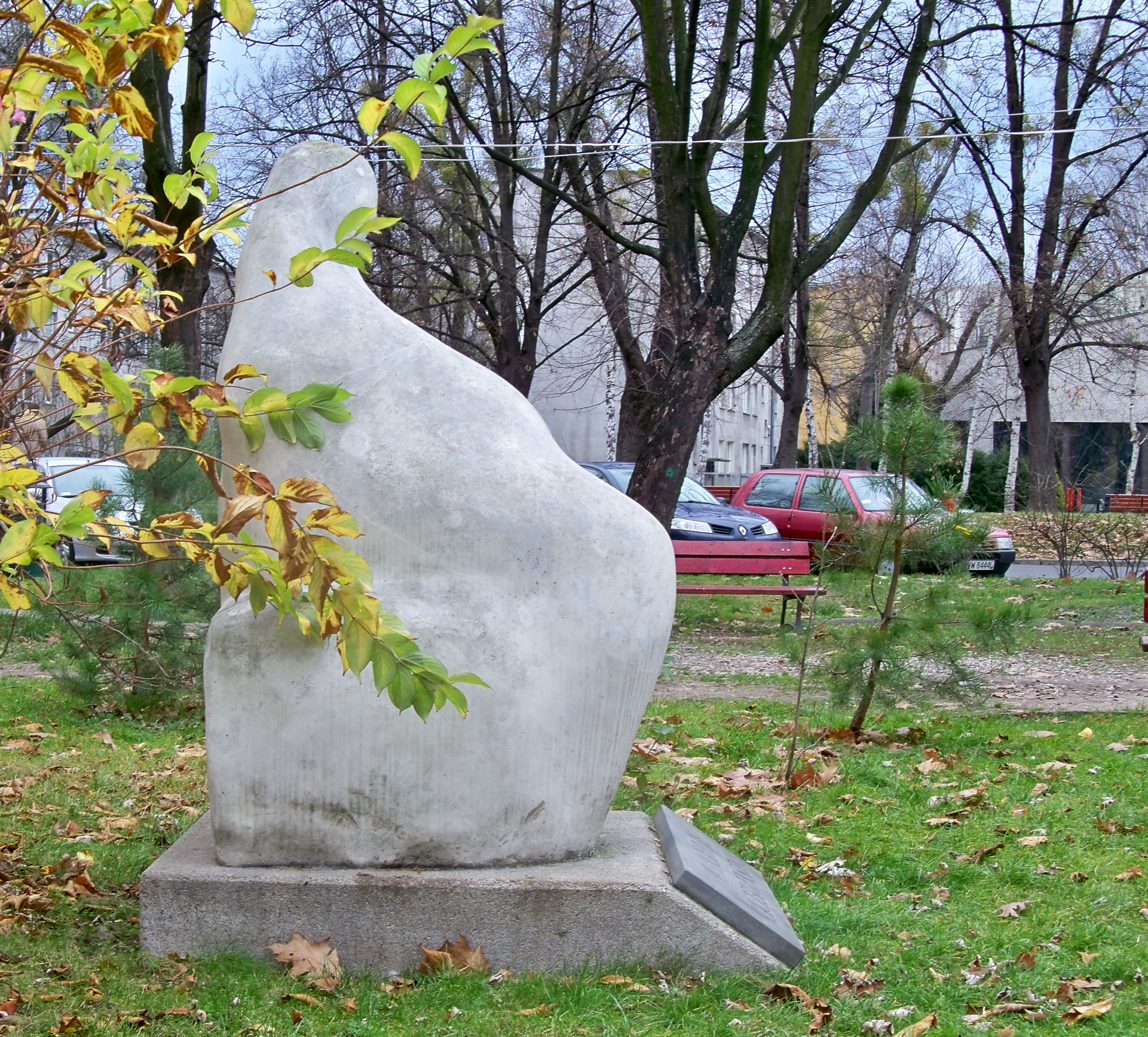
The sculpture Tribute to Motherhood.

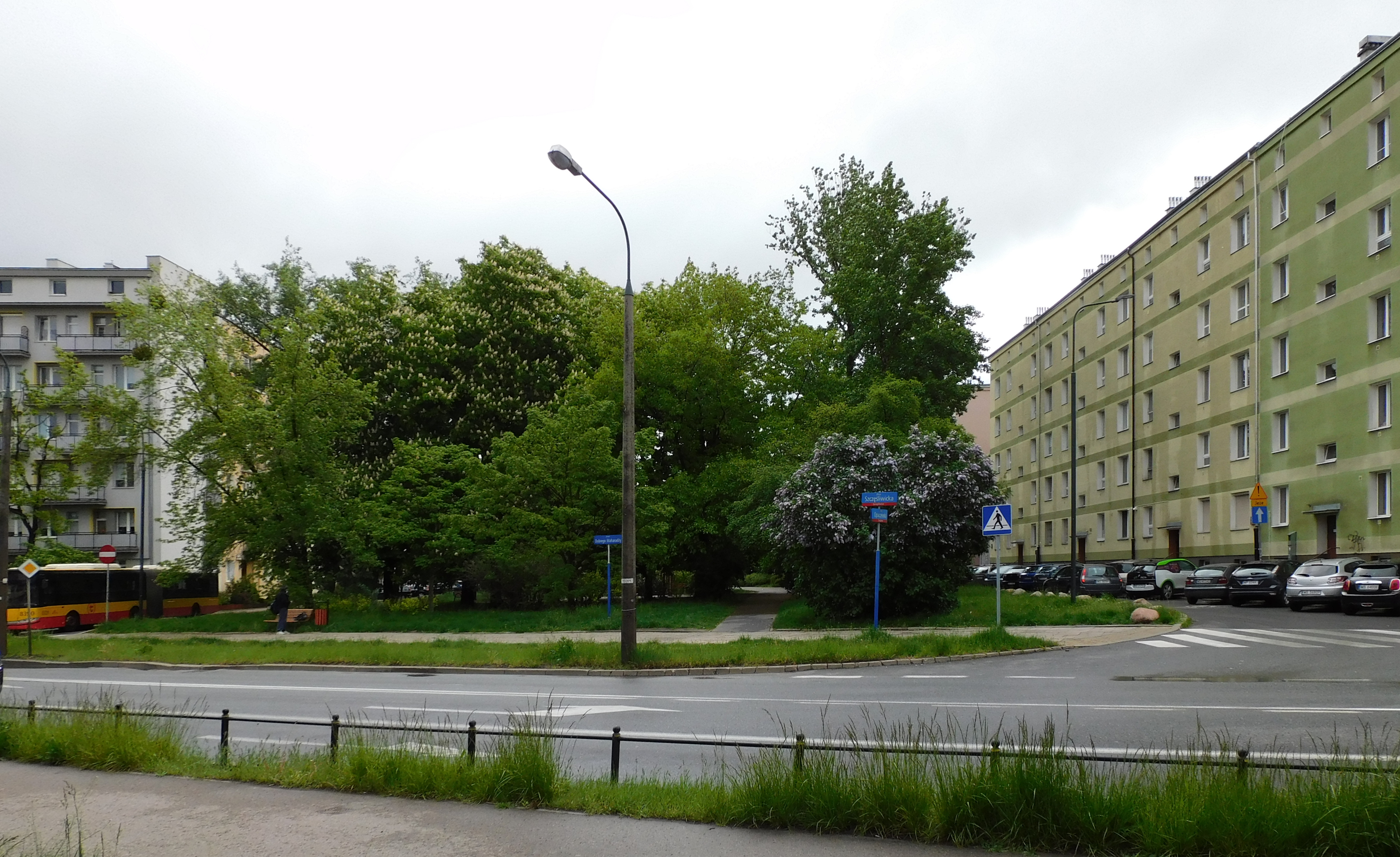
The square as seen from the intersection of Opaczewska and Szczęśliwicka Streets.

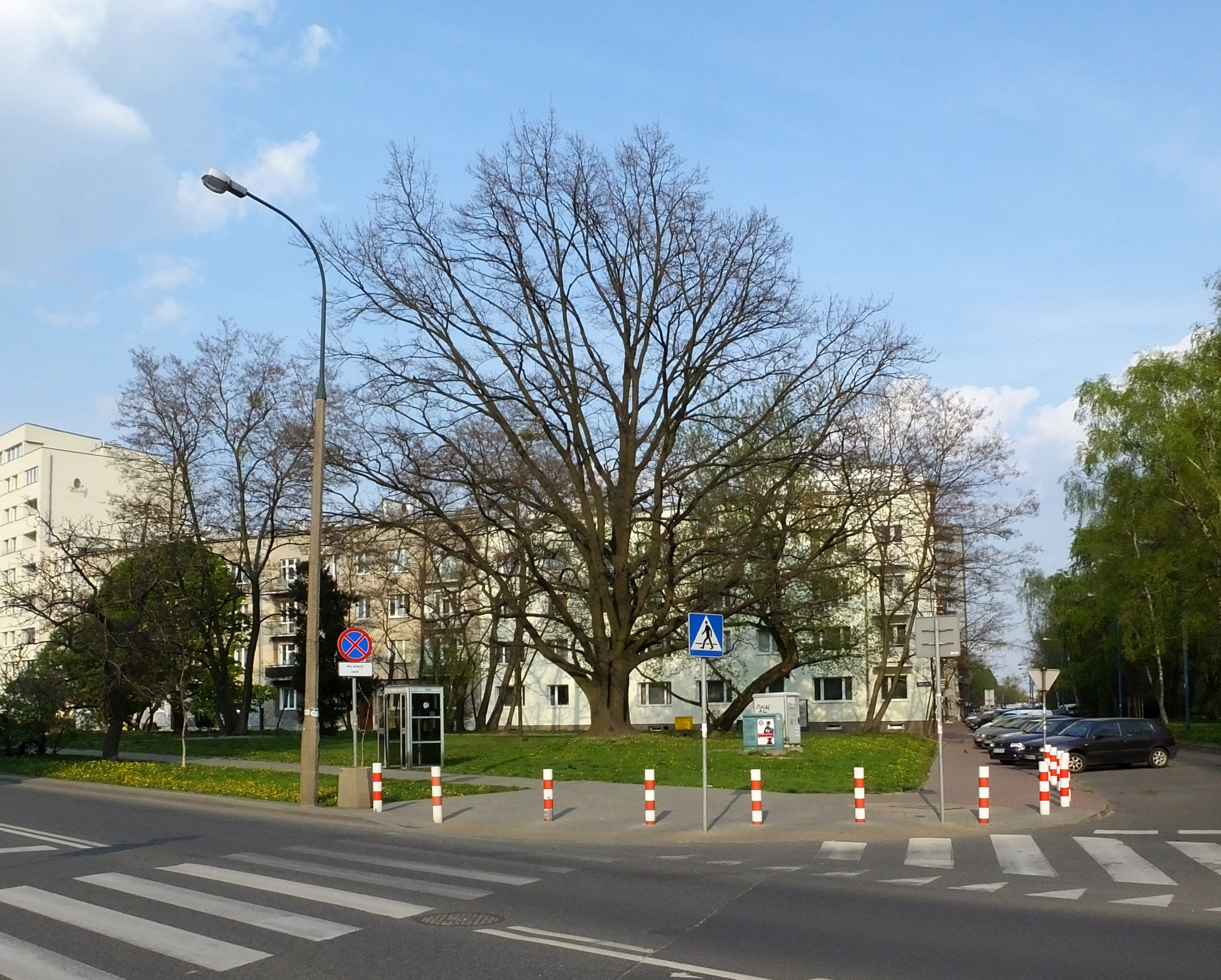
Angel Land Square in 2015.
