= Defense of Ochota and Wola (1939) =

Military actions undertaken by the Polish Army during the invasion of Poland

- Part of Invasion of Poland
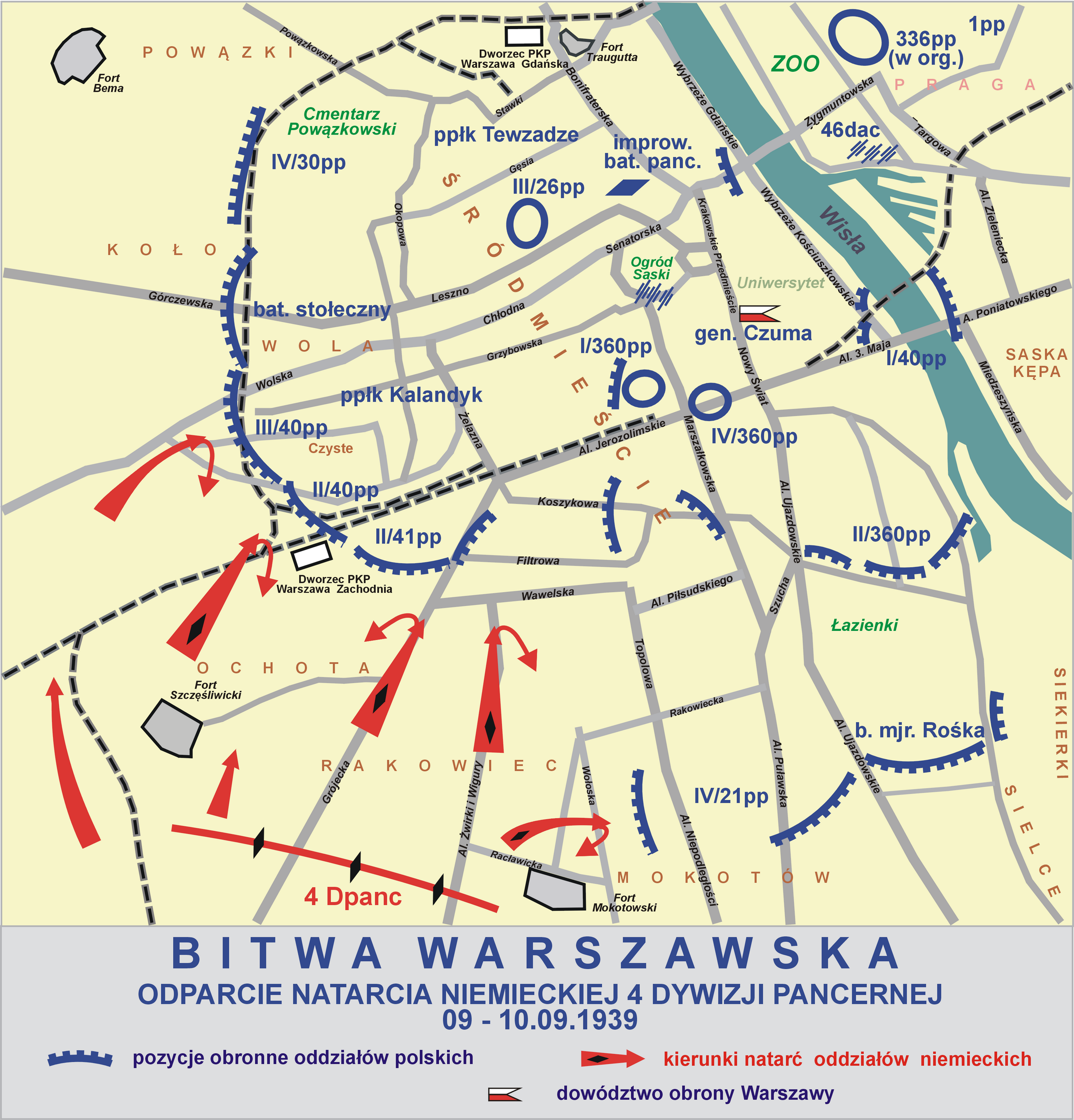
Date	8–9 September, 1939
Location	Warsaw 52°12′36.9360″N 20°58′32.8800″E
Result	Polish victory

Belligerents
Poland	Germany

Commanders and leaders
Walerian Czuma; Marian Porwit; Józef Kalandyk	Georg-Hans Reinhardt

Strength
Three infantry battalions approximately 20 75 mm guns a dozen anti-tank guns 5 tanks	Armored division reinforced with a motorized infantry regiment from 250 to 260 tanks approximately 50 armored vehicles

Casualties and losses
Several dozen killed and wounded	From 63 to 120 destroyed and damaged tanks several hundred killed, wounded and captured
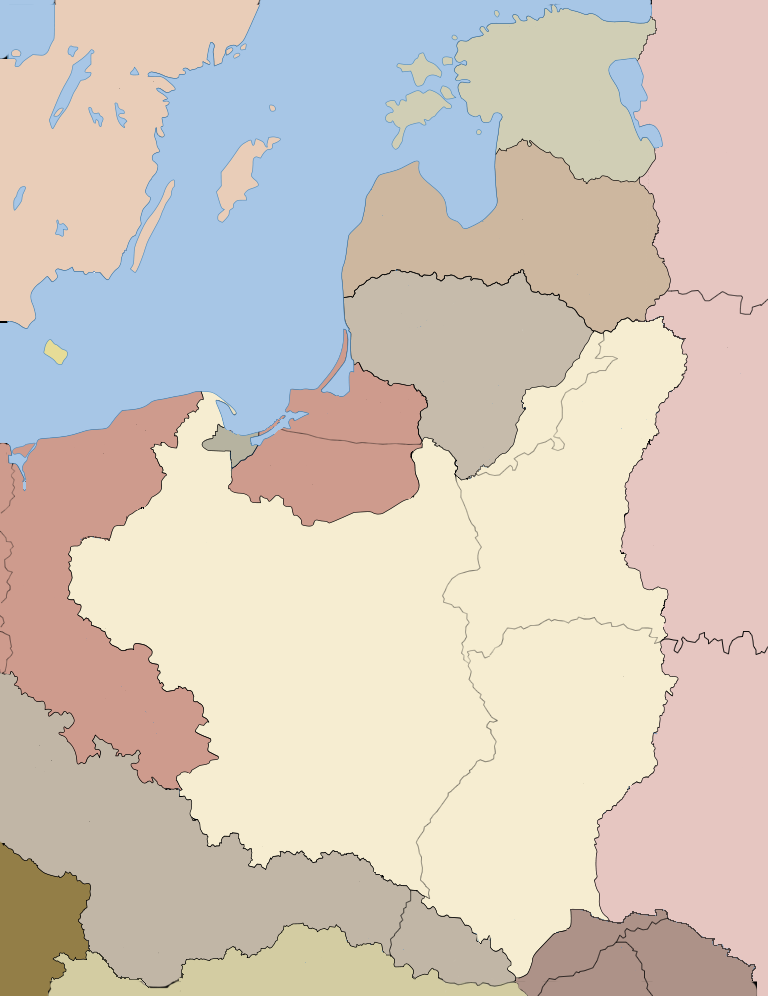
- Location within Poland

The Defense of Ochota and Wola refers to military actions undertaken by the Polish Army on 8–9 September 1939 during the September campaign, in the districts of Ochota and Wola in Warsaw. The result was the repulsion of the German assault by the 4th Panzer Division and thus the thwarting of the German plan for a rapid capture of the Polish capital.

On 8 September 1939, German tanks reached the outskirts of Warsaw. Believing that merely their presence would break the defenders' will to fight, General Georg-Hans Reinhardt attempted to capture the city that same afternoon. However, the German tanks advancing along the Kraków Avenue were repelled by the fire of Polish artillery and infantry. The next day, after bringing up artillery and the main forces of the 4th Panzer Division, the Germans launched a regular assault. The main focus of the attack was on Ochota, although fighting also broke out in Wola and at Mokotów Field after a while. The Polish defenders managed to repel the enemy assault, and the 4th Panzer Division suffered the loss of up to 50% of its tanks during its unsuccessful attempt to capture Warsaw.

The defense of Ochota and Wola was the greatest success achieved by the Poles during the defense of Warsaw in September 1939. The repulsion of the attack had a positive impact on the morale of both soldiers and civilians. Combined with the Polish counteroffensive that began at the same time on the Bzura river, it forced the Germans to temporarily cease their attempts to capture Warsaw through direct assault.

== Background ==
Plan West assigned Warsaw a relatively modest role in the event of war with Germany. Polish planners assumed that the fighting would take place far from the capital, and the possibility of the enemy quickly reaching its borders, let alone Warsaw being surrounded, was not even considered. The main military tasks planned for the city focused primarily on repelling Luftwaffe attacks.

On 1 September 1939, Germany launched its armed aggression against Poland. On the night of 1 to 2 September, the German 10th Army broke through the Polish front near Częstochowa. By the evening of September 5, the Łódź Army, which had been defending against the German advance, was forced to abandon its main defensive position and begin a general retreat. Meanwhile, in battles near Piotrków Trybunalski and Tomaszów Mazowiecki, the Germans defeated the not fully concentrated and poorly led Prussian Army. These victories opened the way for them towards central Wisła and Warsaw.

On September 3, the Commander-in-Chief of the Border Guard, Brigadier General Walerian Czuma, was summoned by the Minister of Military Affairs, General Tadeusz Kasprzycki, and tasked with organizing the defense of the capital. Work began on forming the staff of the Warsaw Defense Command. The next day, General Mieczysław Ryś-Trojanowski officially appointed General Czuma as the commander of the Warsaw garrison. Due to previous neglect by the high command, Czuma had to organize the city's defense from scratch, in conditions of complete improvisation. Worse still, the preparations were disrupted by chaos and panic, caused by the hasty evacuation of government authorities. The situation was further worsened by the exodus of civilians, driven by an ill-conceived radio appeal made by the Head of Propaganda of the Supreme Command, Lieutenant Colonel Roman Umiastowski, on September 6. Ultimately, General Czuma, with significant support from the city's commissioner president, Stefan Starzyński – who became Civil Commissioner of the Warsaw Defense Command on September 8 – managed to bring the situation under control and prepare the city for defense in less than four days.

By September 8, the Warsaw garrison consisted of 17 infantry battalions, 10 light artillery batteries, 6 heavy artillery batteries, and the equivalent of a tank battalion (the so-called Armored-Motor Group of the Warsaw Defense Command, under Captain Bolesław Kowalski).

== Polish defense in Ochota and Wola ==
On 8 September 1939, the Warsaw Defense Command reorganized the defense of the left-bank part of the city, dividing it into three sectors. The districts of Wola and Ochota were included in the "West" sector, commanded by Lieutenant Colonel Józef Kalandyk, who also led the 40th Infantry Regiment of the Lviv Children. The command post was located in the Mounted Police barracks at 13 Ciepła Street.

The forward defensive line of the "West" sector began in Ochota, starting at Sucha Street, (Note: Currently Ludwik Krzywicki Street.) running along the northern edge of the Mokotów Field, along Wawelska Street, and reaching Opaczewska Street at Ludwik Pasteur Street. From there, it continued along Opaczewska Street to Mszczonowska Street and, crossing the railroad tracks, reached Wola. In Wola, it ran first along Gizów and Redutowa streets, reaching the Koło neighborhood and covering its western edge. This line was defended by three infantry battalions supported by artillery units equivalent to slightly more than a division.

The II Battalion of the 41st Suwałki Infantry Regiment held positions along Wawelska Street (starting from Sucha Street), with its defensive line continuing along Ludwik Pasteur and Opaczewska streets to Białobrzeska Street. Its commander, Major Roman Zagłoba-Kaniowski, set up his command post at 24 Grójecka Street. The individual subunits were deployed as follows:

- 5th Company: Wawelska – Ludwik Pasteur streets
- 6th Company: eastern section of Opaczewska Street
- 4th Company (reserve): Warsaw Water Filters
- Artillery:
  - 1st Platoon, 1st Battery, 29th Field Artillery Regiment (2 guns, 75 mm): one unit at the intersection of Grójecka and Nieborowska streets, the other at the corner of Słupecka Street.
  - 2nd Platoon, 1st Battery, 29th Field Artillery Regiment (2 guns, 75 mm): (Note: Wroniszewski (1976, pp. 28–29, 48) reported that the platoon consisted of three 75 mm guns, two of which were deployed in the square at the corner of Raszyńska and Reja streets. However, other sources indicate that the third unit only joined the platoon on September 12 (Grzybowski (1990, p. 43)).) one unit at the intersection of Wawelska Street and Żwirki i Wigury Street, near the Naval Headquarters building (according to other sources – in the square at the corner of Raszyńska and Rej streets), the other at the intersection of Raszyńska and Filtrowa streets.
  - Motorized Anti-Tank Company (Note: From the ranks of the Warsaw Armoured Motorized Brigade (Grzybowski (1990, p. 42)).) (3 anti-tank guns, 37 mm): northern edge of Mokotów Field, between Sucha Street and Żwirki i Wigury Street.
  - 2nd Anti-Tank Platoon, 41st Infantry Regiment (3 anti-tank guns, 37 mm): one unit in the building at 9 Wawelska Street, (Note: According to other sources, in the building at 6 Wawelska Street (Grzybowski (1990, p. 45)).) another in the square by the Radium Institute, (Note: In the afternoon of September 9, it was relocated to the Institute of Chemistry building on Ludwik Pasteur Street (Wroniszewski (1976, p. 49)).) and the third in the administrative building of the Zieleniak market. (Note: In the afternoon of September 9, it was relocated to the building at the eastern corner of Grójecka and Opaczewska streets (Wroniszewski (1976, p. 49)).)

The II Battalion of the 40th Infantry Regiment of the Lviv Children held positions starting at the intersection of Opaczewska and Mątwicka streets, continuing along the western part of Opaczewska Street, and then along Mszczonowska (on both sides of the Warsaw Cross-City Line) and Gizów streets to Jan Kazimierz Street (including the intersection with Wolska Street). Its commander, Major Antoni Kassian, set up his command post at 11 Sękocińska Street. The individual subunits were deployed as follows:

- 4th Company: buildings along the northern side of Opaczewska Street, then a trench angled northwards with a front facing west, protecting scattered buildings on the western side of Szczęśliwicka Street, up to the Konarzewski tannery at the corner of Szczęśliwicka and Ogrodzieniecka streets.
- 5th Company: its defensive positions began east of Na Bateryjce Street, then ran along the edge of the railway workers' settlement in Czyste, and then along Mszczonowska and Gizów streets.
- 6th Company (reserve): one platoon was positioned at Częstochowska Street, and another at the intersection of Brylowska and Kopińska streets, behind the front-line units. The third platoon, deployed around Niemcewicza and Sękocińska streets and the railway tracks, protected the battalion command post, field kitchens, and transport.
- Artillery:
  - Infantry Artillery Platoon, 41st Infantry Regiment (2 guns, 75 mm): one unit at the intersection of Szczęśliwicka and Częstochowska streets, the other at the intersection of Kopińska and Skalmierzycka streets.
  - 3rd Battery, 41st Field Artillery Regiment (2 guns, 75 mm): Gizów Street.
  - Anti-Tank Platoon, 40th Infantry Regiment (5 anti-tank guns, 37 mm): one unit at the intersection of Opaczewska and Szczęśliwicka streets, another on the western side of Szczęśliwicka Street, a third at the intersection of Gizów, Mszczonowska, and Gniewkowska streets, a fourth at the intersection of Sękocińska and Szczęśliwicka streets, and a fifth at the intersection of Słupecka, Sękocińska, and Kaliska streets.

The III Battalion of the 40th Infantry Regiment of the Lviv Children held positions from Wolska Street, along Redutowa and Księcia Janusza streets, to Fort Bema. Its commander, Major Antoni Sanojca, set up his command post at a pencil factory on Syreny Street. The individual subunits were deployed as follows:

- 7th Company: Księcia Janusza Street
- 8th Company: Gizów – Redutowa streets
- 9th Company (reserve): western side of the Cross-City Line
- Artillery:
  - 3rd Battery, 41st Field Artillery Regiment (2 guns, 75 mm): on both sides of Wolska Street, behind the positions of the 8th Company, near a barricade across the street at Gizów Street.
  - 1st Battery, 41st Field Artillery Regiment (2 guns, 75 mm): on both sides of Górczewska Street, behind the positions of the 7th Company.
  - Infantry Artillery Platoon, 40th Infantry Regiment (2 guns, 75 mm): one unit at Wolska Street (near Płocka Street), the other at Górczewska Street, also near Płocka Street.
  - Anti-Tank Platoon, 40th Infantry Regiment (4 anti-tank guns, 37 mm): one unit on the left side of Wolska Street, near the barricade, another in the angle of buildings 151 and 149 on Wolska Street, a third in the gate of St. Lawrence's Church, and a fourth on Górczewska Street (on its right side).
  - Motorized Anti-Tank Company (3 anti-tank guns, 37 mm): behind the positions of the 8th Company, with two units to the left of Wolska Street (in the area of Gizów Street) and one to the right of Wolska Street (near Redutowa Street).

The second line of defense in Ochota stretched from the Warsaw University of Technology buildings to Szczęśliwicka Street. It was manned by the III Battalion of the not-yet-fully-formed 360th Infantry Regiment, commanded by Major Wacław Niedzielski. The second line of defense in Wola was manned by the I Battalion of the 360th Infantry Regiment under the command of Major Artemi Aroniszydze.

If needed, additional fire support could be provided by two platoons from the 1st Battery of the Warsaw Defense, deployed at the end of Independence Avenue near the Mokotów Field and in the vicinity of Artur Zawisza Square (Note: It was a volunteer unit commanded by Reserve Lieutenant Janusz Łonicki. Its equipment consisted of 75 mm guns, which were accidentally discovered in the abandoned Fort Bema (Wroniszewski (1976, p. 29)).) (a total of 5 guns, 75 mm). This meant that the infantry of the "West" sector could count on the support of approximately 20 guns, 75 mm, and several dozen anti-tank guns, 37 mm.

As early as September 5, barricades and anti-tank barriers began to be constructed in Ochota, particularly blocking key routes leading into the city. The civilian population actively participated in their construction. Minefields were laid in the outskirts. Obstacles, fortifications, and mines were also set up in Wola.

Like in other sectors, General Czuma based the Polish defense on the compact urban fabric, hoping to offset the enemy's advantage in armored forces. Polish units primarily manned the main routes leading into the city, while the spaces between them were only guarded by outposts. The course of the fighting proved this to be a wise decision. However, it was a mistake to leave Fort Szczęśliwice unguarded, as the Germans later used it as a base for attacks on Ochota.

== Fighting on September 8 ==
=== Prelude ===
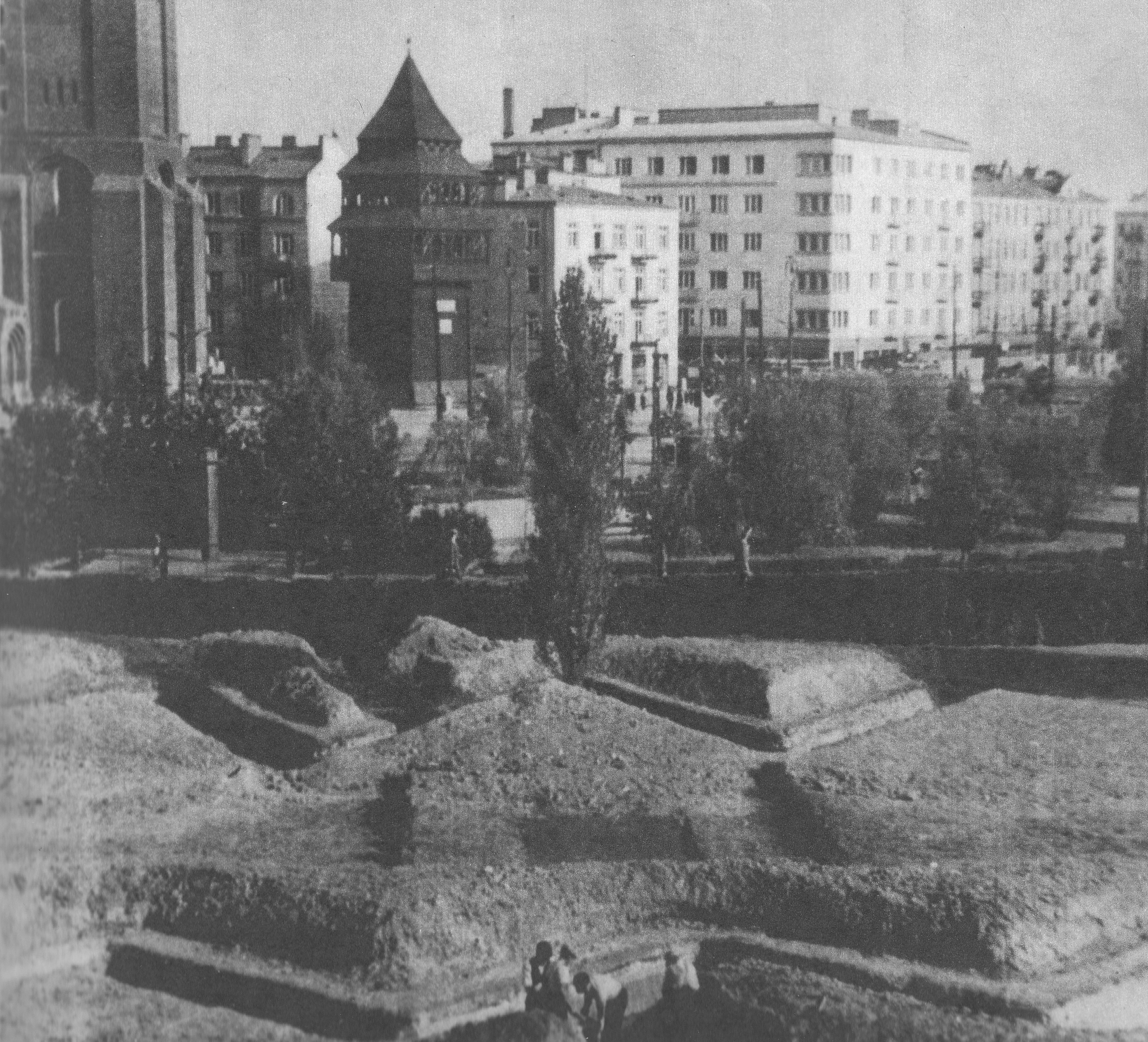
Trenches at Narutowicz Square

On September 8 at around 5:00 AM, the reconnaissance company of the 40th Infantry Regiment, acting on the orders of Lieutenant Colonel Kalandyk, sent out two patrols to reconnoiter the approaches to the capital. A mounted platoon led by the company commander, Second Lieutenant Tadeusz Düring, headed towards Ożarów Mazowiecki and Piastów. A platoon of cyclists commanded by Reserve Second Lieutenant Zdzisław Szczudłowski went in the direction of Falenty. Both subunits returned to Warsaw around 10:00 AM, having failed to make contact with the enemy. Two officer patrols sent at 8:00 AM by the II and III battalions of the 40th Infantry Regiment (the first heading towards Rakowiec and Szczęśliwice, the second towards Włochy) also did not encounter any Germans.

Before noon, independent of Lieutenant Colonel Kalandyk, Colonel Tadeusz Roman Tomaszewski, the chief of staff of the Command of the Defense of Warsaw, decided to direct reconnaissance towards the western approaches to the capital. Motorized pioneer patrols and a reconnaissance tank company under the command of Captain Antoni Brażuk set out on this task.

On the same day, the German XVI Army Corps, commanded by General Erich Hoepner, reached Warsaw. Its right-flank 1st Panzer Division captured Góra Kalwaria. Meanwhile, the 4th Panzer Division reached the Pruszków – Raszyn line around noon. Its leading units encountered and defeated Captain Brażuk's reconnaissance tank company. The Poles lost 12 soldiers and 5 TK-3 tankettes.

Before noon, civilians brought news to Warsaw about the advancing German troops. Around 2:00 PM, a reconnaissance company from the 40th Infantry Regiment was sent towards Ożarów and Grodzisk. It was forced to retreat by superior enemy forces. By 3:00 PM, German tank crews had taken control of the airport at Okęcie. They also captured the unprotected Włochy and Raszyn, where they seized the Raszyn radio transmitter. The Polish personnel managed to disable it in time, for which almost all of its members were immediately arrested.

The commander of the 4th Panzer Division, General Georg-Hans Reinhardt, set up his command post in Raszyn. Later that same day, he was visited there by the commander of the 10th Army, General Walter von Reichenau, accompanied by General Hoepner. Both superiors reassured Reinhardt that Warsaw would not be defended. In this situation, the division commander decided to attempt to seize the city in a rapid assault that very afternoon.

The 4th Panzer Division had suffered losses during the previous fighting; however, it still had between 250 and 260 tanks and 50 armored vehicles. Additionally, it was reinforced by the 33rd Motorized Infantry Regiment from the 13th Motorized Infantry Division and a battalion of artillery and sappers. The division was still not fully concentrated. Nevertheless, Reinhardt was convinced that the mere sight of tanks would paralyze the defenders' will to fight. Regular soldiers also approached the battle with great optimism. As Reinhardt recalled:

An extraordinary tension prevailed in the division. In every eye, there was proud joy at experiencing the momentous occasion of entering the enemy's capital on the eighth day of war. Without orders, the crews decorated their vehicles with reconnaissance flags featuring the swastika. No one thought of serious combat. Many saw themselves already as masters of the city, enjoying hotels and the best accommodations.

That day, General Czuma issued a daily order, urging soldiers to fight for the defense of the capital. It included the following words:

Soldiers of the Warsaw garrison! The Supreme Commander has entrusted us with the defense of the Capital. He demands that the enemy's assault break against the walls of Warsaw, that an end be put to the destruction of Polish lands; to avenge our fallen comrades in battle, men, women, and children who have died a soldier's death. We must extend a helping hand to the weary fighting units, facilitating their further combat tasks. Soldiers! We have taken a position from which there is no retreat. In this position, the enemy may only hear one answer: 'Enough! Not one step further!' And we may submit only one report: 'The order of the Supreme Commander will be fulfilled'.

General Czuma, together with Colonel Marian Porwit, also conducted an inspection of the distant front. When they were near Błonie, they received a report from a lone motorcyclist that German tanks were just one and a half kilometers away. They immediately returned to Warsaw, heading for Ochota, where they personally informed the garrison of this most threatened sector about the approaching enemy. General Czuma ordered vehicles with refugees to be removed from the Kraków Avenue, correctly anticipating that the German attack would come from that direction.

=== Course of the first battle ===
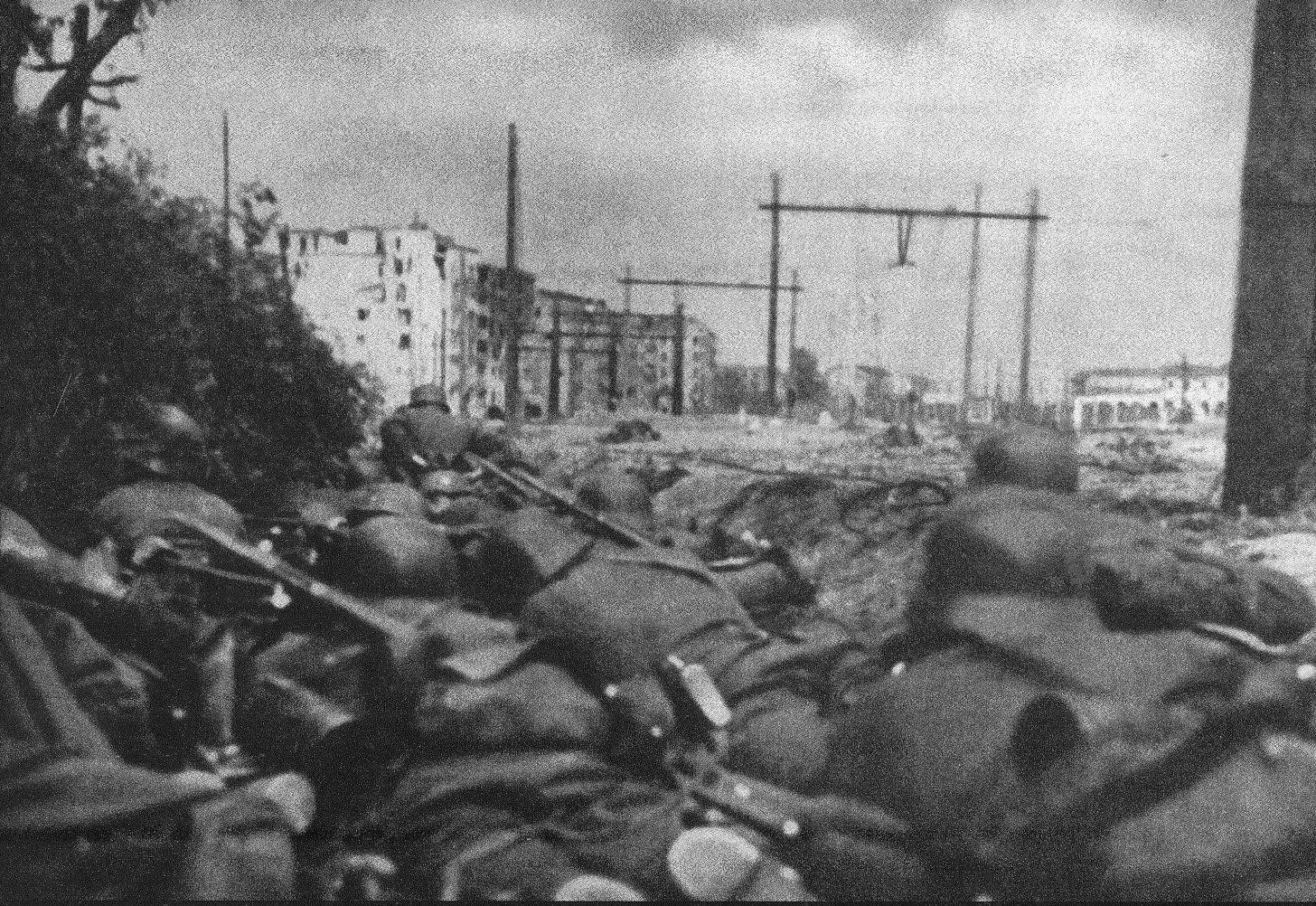
Soldiers of the 4th Panzer Division in Ochota on 8 September 1939

The German armored column set out around 5:00 PM from the Okęcie area. At the same time, German artillery from the vicinity of Raszyn bombarded the Polish capital for the first time in the September campaign. When the tanks reached the allotment gardens on the outskirts of Ochota, a radio message was sent from the 4th Panzer Division headquarters: "German troops entered Warsaw today at 5:15 PM". Shortly thereafter, this was echoed by the Reichs-Rundfunk-Gesellschaft radio and subsequently by foreign news agencies.

According to German sources, the battle began at 5:15 PM, while Polish reports from September 8–9 indicated it started at 6:00 PM. The German column consisted of 15 to 30 vehicles.

After crossing the tracks of the Radom line, the tanks deployed into combat formation on both sides of the Kraków Avenue. When they were between 400 and 500 meters from the Polish positions, they were fired upon by a Polish anti-tank gun located in the administrative building of Zieleniak, at the first barricade on Grójecka Street. It is likely that infantry from the 6th Company of the 41st Infantry Regiment, defending the barricade, also engaged in the fighting. A battle ensued. The barricade on Grójecka Street, built primarily from wooden, flammable materials, was set ablaze by German shells. Some of the tanks turned west, seeking gaps in the Polish defense. However, they came under fire from the anti-tank gun and machine guns from the positions of the 4th Company of the 40th Infantry Regiment. Perhaps 1 or 2 anti-tank guns from the area of Czyste also opened fire on them. Three tanks turned east and pushed into Mokotów Field but were driven away by a Polish anti-tank gun from the square near the Radium Institute. The following motorized infantry deployed into a skirmish line but was quickly recalled at the signal of a rocket.

Fearing that the tanks would become embroiled in night fighting in the city, General Reinhardt, in agreement with General Hoepner, ordered a halt to the assault. According to General Czuma's report, Polish losses amounted to 5 killed and two wounded (all from the 41st Infantry Regiment). (Note: Grzybowski (1990, p. 68) states that the Poles lost 4 killed and 3 wounded, including 3 killed and 2 wounded from the 41st Infantry Regiment and 1 killed and 1 wounded from the 40th Infantry Regiment.) The Germans reportedly lost 4 tanks, of which all but one were managed to be towed from the battlefield.

Taking advantage of the pause in fighting, the Poles strengthened their fortifications. The burned barricade at Zieleniak was rebuilt. Based on the experiences from the first battle, materials that were not easily flammable were used for this: street paving, tram rails, and scrap iron.

== Fighting on September 9 ==
=== Prelude ===
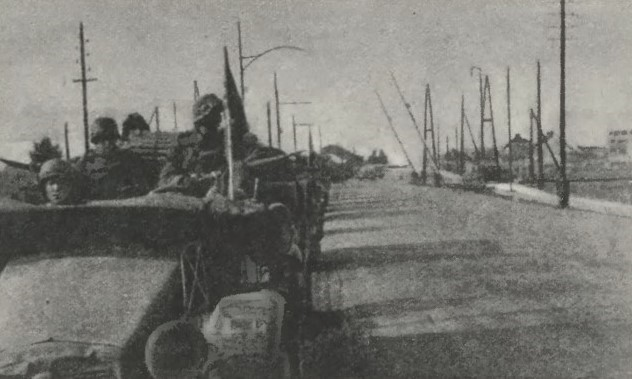
Soldiers of the 4th Panzer Division at Okęcie before the attack on 9 September 1939

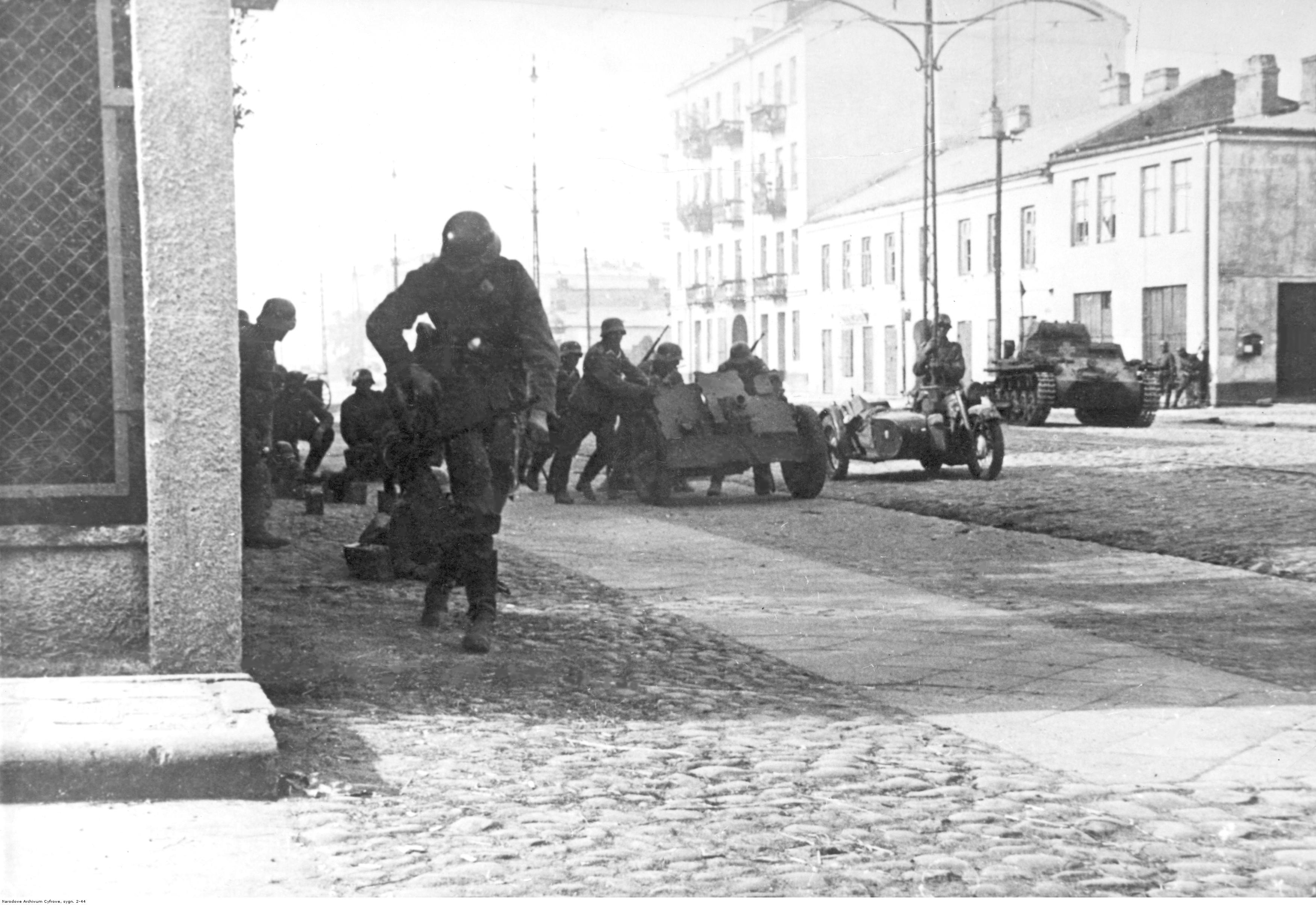
German soldiers in Ochota on 9 September 1939

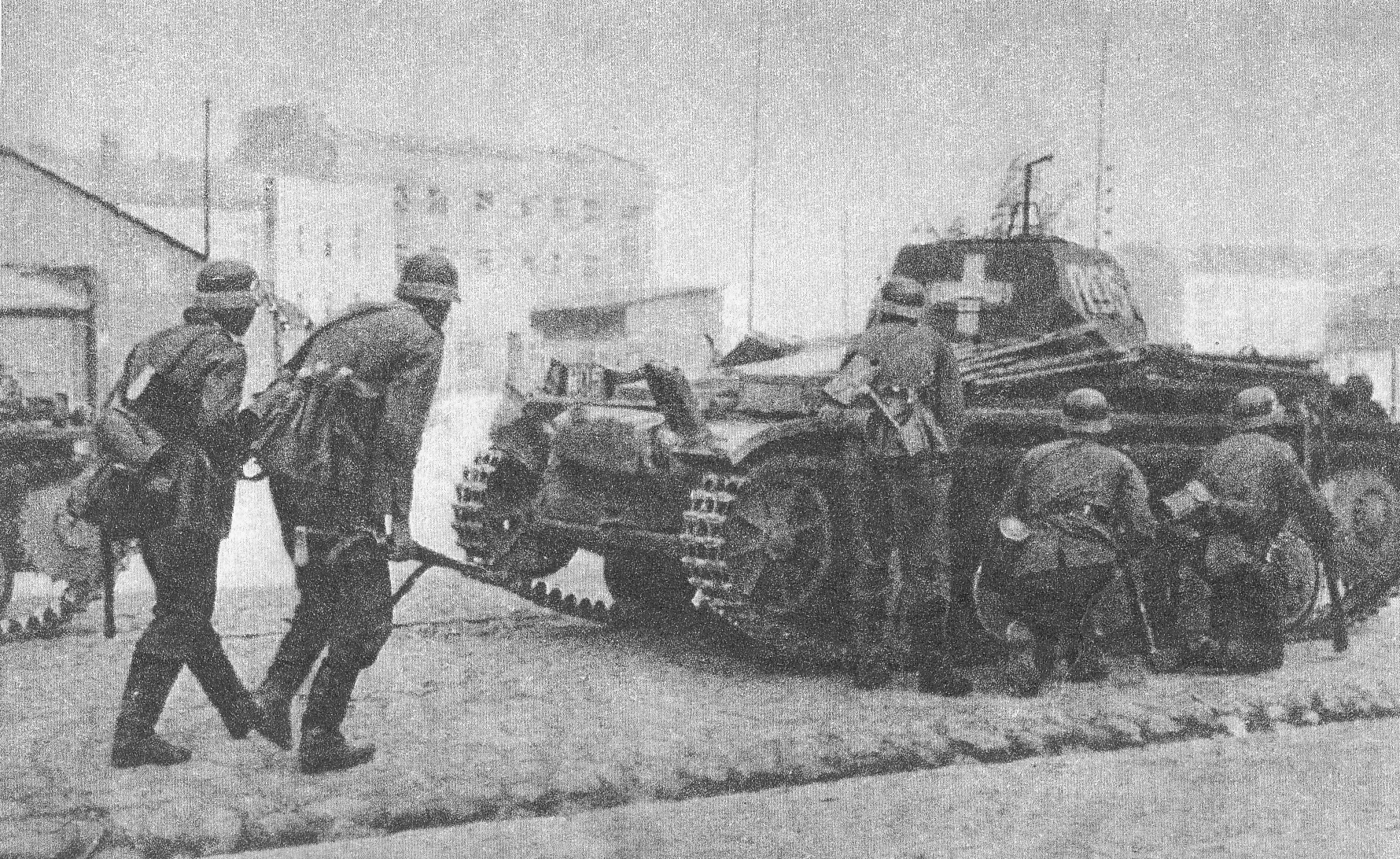
Soldiers of the German 4th Panzer Division in Grójecka Street in Ochota

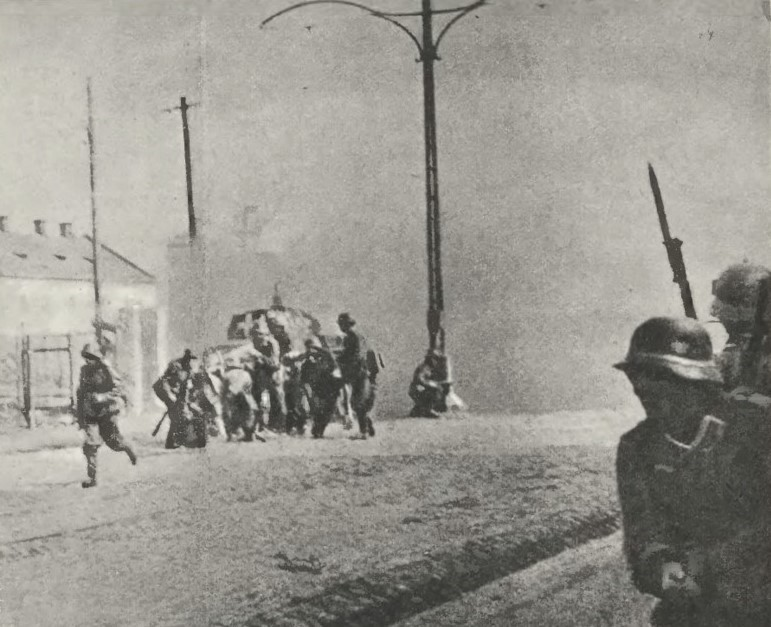
Fighting in Ochota on 9 September 1939

On the evening of 8 September, the 4th Panzer Division concentrated in the area of Raków, Zosin, Szczęśliwice, and Rakowiec, where it spent the night in a formation enabling a circular defense. At the same time, artillery was brought up to intensively bombard Warsaw. As a result of the shelling, which lasted into the night, numerous fires broke out in the areas of Sienna, Sosnowa, Śliska, and Złota streets. One of the gas tanks in Wola also caught fire. Consequently, President Starzyński was forced to make the decision to immobilize the Warsaw Gasworks.

That night, railroad workers from the Warszawa Zachodnia station evacuated an abandoned train from railway station in Włochy (already occupied by the Germans) full of engineering and artillery equipment.

The first setback did not discourage General Reinhardt. He remained convinced that the defenders were unprepared for serious fighting, and therefore a concentric attack by the entire division, supported by artillery fire, would lead to the rapid fall of the Polish capital. Factors related to public image may have also played a role. The previous day, German radio had prematurely announced that German troops had entered Warsaw. A quick occupation of the city would help erase this embarrassment.

Starting from 4:30 AM, Warsaw was regularly attacked by the Luftwaffe. The targets of the German pilots were primarily bridges, train stations, and the city's main exit roads, with the strongest bombing occurring in Praga. At the same time, around 7:00 AM, German artillery resumed shelling residential districts, attempting to terrorize the defenders and the population.

Around 7:30 AM, the Germans began their assault on Warsaw. The 4th Panzer Division attacked in two columns, protected on the flanks by mechanized infantry units and supported by artillery:

- The first column consisted of the 36th Tank Regiment along with the 33rd Motorized Infantry Regiment (minus one battalion), supported by the 1st Squadron of the 103rd Artillery Regiment. They advanced along Grójecka and Szczęśliwicka streets.
- The second column consisted of the 35th Tank Regiment and the 12th Motorized Rifle Regiment, supported by the 2nd Squadron of the 103rd Artillery Regiment. They advanced along Żwirki i Wigury Street.

The flank units launched their attack on Wola and through Mokotów Field, starting about half an hour later than the main columns.

In the first phase of the fighting, German tanks came under fire from Polish heavy artillery. The most effective was the 6th Battery of the 3rd Artillery Regiment, whose fire was directed by Second Lieutenant Kazimierz Paprocki from an observation post on top of the 1st District Hospital at 218 Independence Avenue. (Note: Wroniszewski (1976, p. 85) stated that the observation post was located on the top floors of the main building of the Academic House at Narutowicz Square.) German tanks, especially from the 35th Tank Regiment, also suffered losses from Polish mines.

=== Course of the battle in the Grójecka Street area ===
Around 7:45 AM, the German column reached the first Polish barricade, which closed Grójecka Street between house number 104 and the wall of the Zieleniak. The Germans managed to breach it and break the resistance of the 6th company of the 41st Infantry Regiment defending that section. (Note: Zawilski (2009, pp. 343–344) and Henryk Stańczyk state that behind the first barricade on Grójecka Street stood a 75 mm gun commanded by Reserve Lieutenant Eugeniusz Niedzielin. This gun reportedly eliminated three tanks and two armored vehicles from combat with fire at close range (Grzelak (2004, p. 116)). However, other sources do not mention the presence of a 75 mm gun in that location. Furthermore, Eugeniusz Niedzielin actually held the rank of corporal or non-commissioned officer (he claimed that he was promoted to the rank of reserve lieutenant after the war began). He was the gunner of a gun dug in at the corner of Grójecka and Nieborowska streets, which was commanded during the battle on September 9 by the commander of the 1st Platoon of the 1st Battery of the 29th Artillery Regiment, Lieutenant Józef Suchocki. Niedzielin was wounded that day (Zarzycki (1999, pp. 34–35); Dziadziuszko (2014, p. 318)). After the war, as an officer of Military Intelligence, he co-created the Stalinist apparatus of repression in the Polish People's Republic. He became notorious as a brutal and ruthless investigator (Dziadziuszko (2014, pp. 317–328)).) On the right flank, to the west of Grójecka Street, a platoon of this company, commanded by Reserve Lieutenant Eugeniusz Preobrażeński, was surrounded. Ten soldiers, including the platoon commander, were killed. On the left flank, the Germans broke the resistance of a platoon commanded by Reserve Lieutenant Jan Chomicz, who defended himself from a trench near the Zieleniak. Despite the unfavorable course of battle, the Polish company did not panic. Some soldiers retreated to nearby gardens, where they established points of resistance. From the administrative building of Zieleniak, they managed to evacuate a 37 mm anti-tank gun. The Poles also maintained positions in the house at 104 Grójecka Street and in the side pavilion of the Hugo Kołłątaj Men's Gymnasium and High School at 93 Grójecka Street.

After breaching the first barricade, the main part of the German column continued its assault along Grójecka Street. Some vehicles, unable to fit on the inadequately wide street, entered side streets and alleys, including Białobrzeska and Wolnej Wszechnicy streets. Alongside the regular soldiers, residents of Ochota joined the fight. From the windows of buildings, German tanks were pelted with petrol bombs and grenades, and stones were thrown at them, along with boiling water. To the east of Zieleniak, the Germans managed to seize the buildings on Opaczewska Street, including the Free Polish University building, but their assault ultimately stalled before Winnicka Street.

Near the intersection of Grójecka and Winnicka streets, the Germans encountered another Polish barricade made from tram cars. 200 meters behind the barricade, at the corner of Grójecka and Nieborowska streets, stood a single 75 mm gun from the 1st Battery of the 29th Artillery Regiment, commanded by Lieutenant Józef Suchocki. Its first two shots missed their target because the gunner mistakenly set the angles due to nerves. However, Lieutenant Suchocki quickly corrected this mistake and destroyed a German tank with a precise shot. Soon after, the Polish gun eliminated another five tanks and two armored vehicles from combat with fire at close range. Their wrecks blocked Grójecka Street. The Germans called for artillery support, whose shells destroyed the barricade. Paradoxically, they made it easier for Lieutenant Suchocki's gunner, who gained insight into the street and opened accurate fire on German vehicles from which motorized infantry was disembarking.

At one point, a German tank appeared at the western exit of Nieborowska Street. However, its crew did not notice the Polish gun. The latter, being dug into the ground, could not change its firing direction to eliminate the threat. In this dangerous moment, a team from the reserve 4th company of the 41st Infantry Regiment, commanded by Lieutenant Stefan Plewka, rushed in from Grójecka Street. The infantry destroyed the enemy vehicle using grenades and captured the crew. Soon after, the Germans halted their attack along Grójecka Street.

=== Course of the battle in the area of Szczęśliwicka Street ===
Parallel to the main attack along Grójecka Street, part of the German column launched an assault in the area between the railway tracks and Szczęśliwicka Street, which was defended by the 4th Company of the 40th Infantry Regiment. The terrain was not favorable for the attackers, as they had to navigate deep curves around the expansive tram depot Rakowiec. They simultaneously came under fire from Polish infantry, anti-tank guns, and a platoon of artillery from the 41st Infantry Regiment. (Note: Wroniszewski (1976, p. 93) states that alongside the infantry, only a single anti-tank gun positioned at the intersection of Opaczewska and Szczęśliwicka streets was firing at the tanks.) On the approach, there were nine immobilized German tanks. Two tanks attempted to penetrate Piotrkowska Street but became stuck on Polish mines, with their fleeing crews shot by Polish infantry. The Germans also lost four tanks when they tried to breach the gap between Polish positions located between Szczęśliwicka and Bem streets. However, the German infantry managed to occupy the buildings at the southern edge of Bem Street. A single German tank managed to reach Kopińska Street, where it was destroyed by civilian volunteers (local workers).

Soon, the Germans managed to infiltrate gaps in the Polish defense. One gap emerged on the left flank, shortly after breaching the first barricade on Grójecka Street. The Germans also managed to infiltrate on the Polish right flank by entering an unguarded gap between the positions of the 4th and 5th Companies of the 40th Infantry Regiment, located between Szczęśliwicka and Bem streets (this gap was only secured by fire from artillery and machine guns, which was only moderately effective due to the undulating terrain). As a result, the 4th Company found itself surrounded. However, the Germans soon encountered the reserve 6th Company of the 40th Infantry Regiment, which held positions along Częstochowska Street. At one point, a platoon of German infantry, supported by two tanks, appeared behind the 4th Company. However, a Polish anti-tank gun dug in at the intersection of Opaczewska and Szczęśliwicka streets managed to set one tank on fire and immobilize the other. The crew of the latter, fleeing towards Bem Street, ran into a Polish gun position from the infantry artillery platoon of the 41st Infantry Regiment and was wiped out. The German platoon was destroyed by a flanking counterattack from the 6th Company and a machine gun platoon, carried out between Częstochowska and Ogrodzieniecka streets. The commander of the 2nd Battalion, Major Kassian, sent a volunteer platoon to assist the 4th Company; its commander, a reserve officer, was killed by a German bullet on Dobosz Street.

The Poles managed to separate the German infantry from the tanks. However, a certain number of tanks, despite lacking cover, continued their assault in the area between the railway tracks and Białobrzeska Street. Some managed to reach Niemcewicz Street. There, however, they encountered a second line of Polish defense, manned by the 9th Company of the reserve 360th Infantry Regiment. The enemy armored vehicles were ultimately stopped and forced to retreat there. One managed to reach the northern edge of Narutowicz Square, where it was destroyed by pioneers and civilian volunteers.

The fighting in this sector weakened around 10:00 AM, and over the next two hours, it nearly ceased altogether.

=== Course of the battle in the area of Żwirki i Wigury Street and Mokotów Field ===
When the second German column reached a distance of between 200 and 300 meters from the intersection of Żwirki i Wigury and Wawelska streets, it came under fire from infantry from the 5th Company of the 41st Infantry Regiment, as well as from 2 to 5 anti-tank guns and 2 75 mm guns from the 1st Battery of the 29th Artillery Regiment. The Polish artillery had a good field of fire since there was no barricade closing Żwirki i Wigury Street, only an anti-tank trench. The Germans lost several tanks in this area, including six that were destroyed by the fire of the 75 mm guns commanded by Second Lieutenant Jan Koreywo. The German assault was halted at the threshold. Additionally, one of the gun crews from the 1st Battery of the 29th Artillery Regiment, together with a heavy artillery battery, destroyed a German battery that was shelling from positions on the edge of the Rakowiec Grove. The commander of one of the tanks in the 35th Tank Regiment reported the course of the battle as follows:

We try to advance further down the street in a two-column formation, firing on the march at suspicious points. Suddenly, I see a flash of flame to the left, diagonally from the garden, and I hear the explosion of grenades. It’s a Polish 75 mm gun firing. We encounter an obstacle, through which one of the tanks is pushing under the cover of its comrades' fire. Then hell breaks loose. Shells hit in rapid succession in front of us. The Polish position is somewhere here. I look around. My eyes widen in horror. Both light tanks are engulfed in flames, so we have guns behind us too. Maybe they are tanks, or perhaps anti-tank guns. I don’t have time to think. I give the heavy tank next to me the order to turn around and withdraw quickly. I keep firing at the gun in front of me. During the maneuvering, the heavy tank gets hit by a 37 mm shell in the engine, fortunately without igniting. The favorable fate causes the smoke grenades burning in the tanks engulfed in flames to cover us with fog.

Shortly thereafter, the 2nd Battalion of the 12th Motorized Rifle Regiment launched an attack on Mokotów Field. Due to favorable terrain conditions, the Germans reached the intersection of Wawelska Street and Independence Avenue. However, there they found themselves under crossfire from the 4th and 5th Companies of the 41st Infantry Regiment, parts of the 360th Infantry Regiment, and the IV March Battalion of the 21st Infantry Regiment (the latter from the direction of Mokotów), as well as from supporting field and anti-tank guns. Under heavy fire, the German assault collapsed, failing to reach Independence Avenue. Soon after, General Czuma directed a platoon of tanks commanded by Lieutenant Władysław Sempoliński to this area. They helped eliminate individual German tanks that managed to breach the line of Wawelska Street and the outskirts of the Staszic Colony.

=== Course of the battle in Wola ===
The German assault also fell on the second western district of Warsaw: Wola. Some sources indicate that part of the German column, which had initially attacked in the area of Szczęśliwicka Street, redirected through Włochy towards Wola, hoping to circumvent the Polish positions. Other sources suggest that Wola was originally the target of the left-wing attack of the 4th Panzer Division, which was covering the advance of the main columns.

The fighting in Wola began later than in Ochota. German tanks appeared in this district at 9:30 AM (according to other sources, not until around 10:15 AM). When the Germans reached the forefront of the 8th Company of the 40th Infantry Regiment's positions, they came under flanking fire from machine guns and anti-tank guns from the 5th Company. The Poles managed to disable two enemy tanks. In retaliation, German artillery shelled the positions of the 5th Company, causing several fires on Gniewkowska Street. Subsequently, seven German tanks, accompanied by infantry, attacked the 5th Company. However, they were fired upon by Polish artillery, which destroyed one of the tanks. The others dispersed, and the infantry, stripped of their support and under fire from the Poles, took cover in the open ground.

At the same time, the enemy also appeared in front of the 7th Company in the area of Górczewska Street. The focus of the German attack was on the left flank of the first platoon. Since the terrain in this area was relatively open and the defenders had no serious fortifications, the Polish company commander decided not to risk close-quarters combat and ordered to open fire when the Germans were still in the open, about 800 meters from Polish positions. The enemy temporarily halted their advance, but soon, under the cover of artillery and mortar fire, six tanks launched an assault. Two were destroyed on the open ground, at the heights of Sowiński and Jan Olbracht streets. When the remaining four tanks approached the Polish positions to within about 100 meters, one was immobilized, and the other, having been hit several times, managed to advance a few meters before ultimately getting stuck on mines in front of the positions of the second platoon. The remaining two reached very close to the positions of the first platoon, where they were destroyed. At the same time, fire from Polish guns, mortars, and machine guns pinned down the German infantry. After a while, they began to retreat, managing to evacuate two damaged tanks.

However, the main axis of the German assault in Wola ran along Wolska Street. The German column advancing into the city shelled and crushed the horse-drawn vehicles blocking their path, which were filled with war refugees. Near the intersection of Redutowa and Gizów streets, close to the Orthodox Cemetery and the historical Redoubt No. 56, there was a barricade defended by the 8th Company of the 40th Infantry Regiment, commanded by Second Lieutenant Zdzisław Pacak-Kuźmirski. The day before, in the Chemical Processing Plant Dobrolin at 159 Wolska Street, he discovered about 100 barrels of turpentine. They were rolled out onto the street and positioned in front of the barricade. When the enemy tanks approached the barricade, the lieutenant ordered to open fire and ignite the turpentine barrels. For nearly 100 meters along Wolska Street, flames erupted. At the same time, Polish artillery shelled the rear of the German column, preventing the enemy from retreating or bringing up reinforcements. The fire from the ignited turpentine quickly engulfed the tightly packed vehicles on the narrow street, causing panic among the tank crews and infantry. Meanwhile, the German vehicles were fired upon at close range by two Polish anti-tank guns. One of them, with Franciszek Głuszek as the gunner, managed to destroy seven tanks. Seeing that the German infantry was trying to hide in nearby buildings, Second Lieutenant Pacak-Kuźmirski ordered a counterattack that ultimately decided the outcome of the battle. Polish soldiers pursued the Germans all the way to the Wola Cemetery. Only a few of them managed to escape death or capture. From 10 to 12 soldiers barricaded themselves in a building on the left side of Wolska Street. When they refused to surrender, Polish soldiers broke down the door and threw grenades inside, causing a fire and killing all the Germans.

The battle in Wola lasted only 45 minutes and resulted in the loss of about 30 tanks and approximately 12 armored vehicles for the Germans. The losses for the 3rd Battalion of the 40th Infantry Regiment were minimal, while numerous casualties were reported among the civilian population.

== Epilogue ==
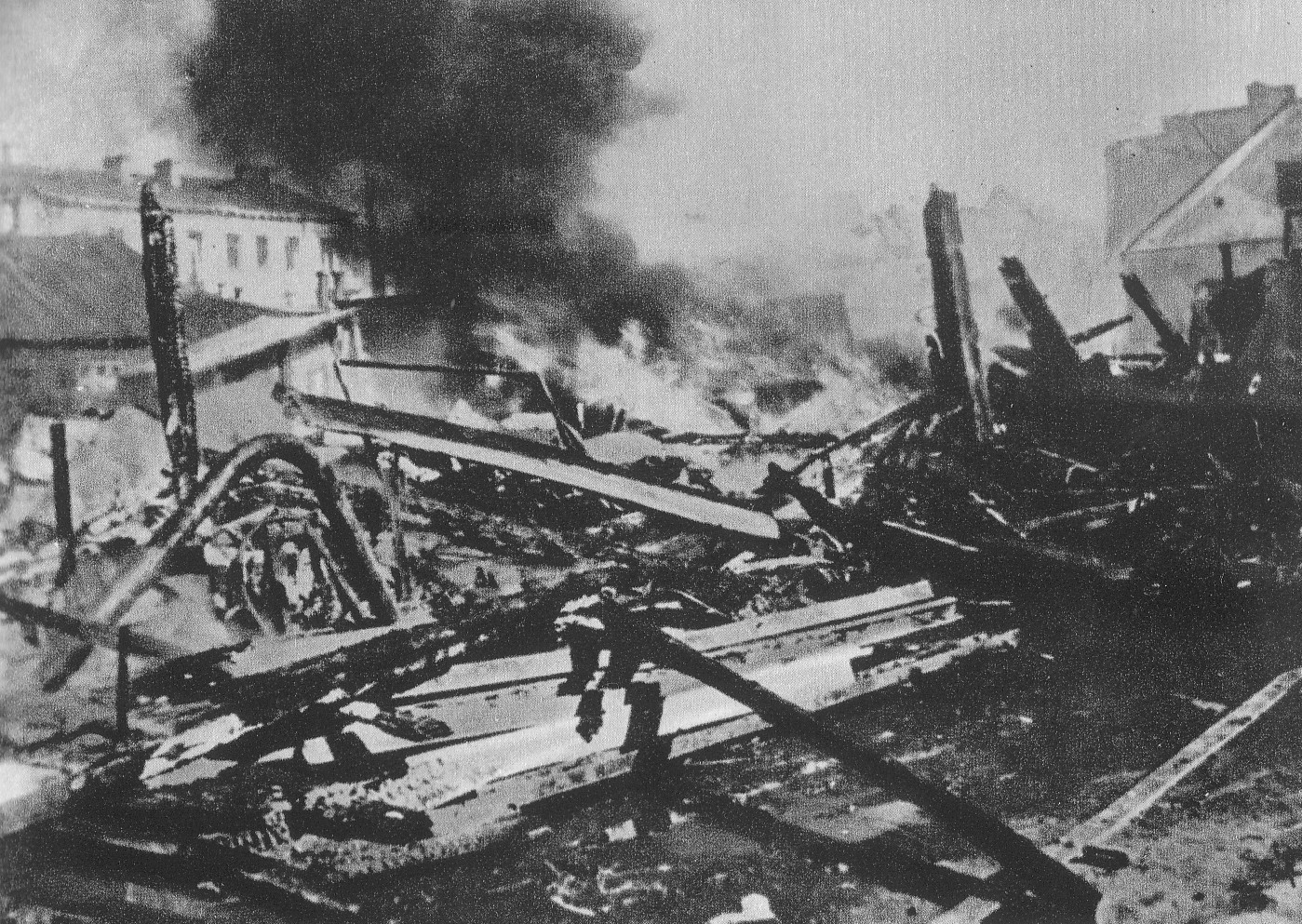
Destruction after the battles in Wola and Ochota on 9 September 1939

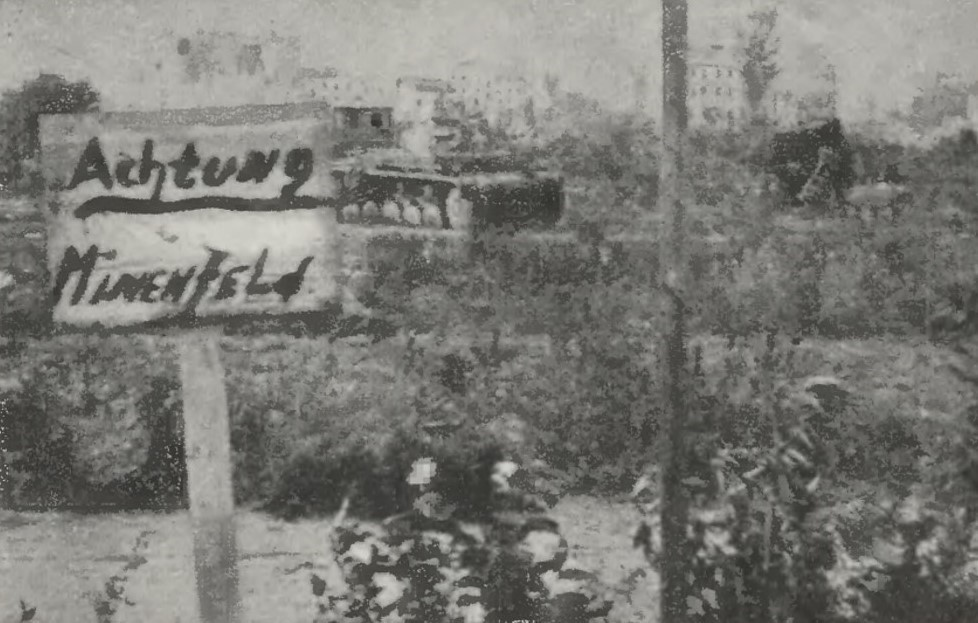
Destroyed German tanks in the allotment gardens on the outskirts of Ochota

Around 9:45 AM, General Reinhardt ordered the halt of the attack and a return to starting positions, but this order did not immediately reach all assault groups, resulting in the fight dragging on in some areas.

From approximately 11:00 AM, after the collapse of the German assault and the retreat of the main forces of the 4th Panzer Division to their starting positions, efforts began to eliminate the stray tanks and isolated resistance points organized ad hoc by German tank crews and infantry who had not managed to withdraw after their units were broken up. Small groups of Germans defended themselves fiercely in various parts of Ochota, hoping that the 4th Panzer Division would soon resume the attack.

At the same time, Colonel Porwit, with the approval of General Czuma, attempted to recapture the line of Opaczewska Street, which had been occupied by German infantry after they broke through the first Polish defensive line. The counterattack, which began around 4:20 PM, primarily involved the 2nd Battalion of the 41st Infantry Regiment, supported by a bicycle platoon from the 40th Infantry Regiment. According to Józef Kazimierz Wroniszewski, a company from the 1st Battalion of the 360th Infantry Regiment also took part. In addition, General Czuma assigned a platoon of 7TP tanks under the command of Second Lieutenant Robert Kraskowski to Colonel Porwit, although, fearing the loss of these valuable vehicles, they were initially used mainly for reconnaissance. Improvised assault groups formed from reserve tank crews also participated in the fighting.

The fighting extended into the evening hours. Five 7TP tanks from Lieutenant Kraskowski's platoon took part, which, according to Wroniszewski, greatly helped eliminate the last German resistance points. They also twice repelled light German tanks attempting to exploit gaps in Polish positions. In the area of Słupecka and Sękocińska streets, an anti-tank gun crew from the 40th Infantry Regiment, not expecting their own tanks, fired two shots at one of the 7TP tanks, damaging it. Ultimately, the Poles succeeded in pushing the enemy back and reclaiming the front line along Opaczewska Street, including the building of the Free Polish University. They also relieved the 6th Company of the 41st Infantry Regiment, which had been surrounded and defending a house at 104 Grójecka Street since the morning. However, in some areas, the Germans managed to hold out until the next day, and in a house at 68 Grójecka Street, they held out until September 13.

During the night of September 9–10, a 62-man detachment from the 3rd Battalion of the 26th Infantry Regiment conducted a raid towards Rakowiec. Under the cover of darkness, they managed to slip between enemy positions and, with a surprise rear attack, destroyed a German outpost with grenades. However, on the way back, illuminated by searchlights, the detachment was fired upon by German machine guns. 37 Polish soldiers were killed or went missing. Three severely wounded, including the detachment commander, Second Lieutenant Feliks Szawłowski, were successfully evacuated.

On September 10, the Germans launched a series of relatively weak attacks on Polish positions in Wola, Ochota, and Mokotów:

- Around 2:30 AM, a German infantry platoon, supported by tanks, attempted to break into the right flank of the 4th Company of the 40th Infantry Regiment on Opaczewska Street. The attack was repelled, although the Germans managed to evacuate several damaged tanks from the field.
- At 3:25 AM, German infantry, supported by tanks, attacked Polish positions in the area of Rakowiecka Street. After losing three tanks, the Germans were forced to withdraw to their starting positions. General Juliusz Rómmel, who had arrived in Warsaw two days earlier, witnessed the battle.
- At 1:00 PM, the Germans sent an infantry platoon, supported by tanks, to attack the positions of the 5th Company of the 40th Infantry Regiment. The assault, carried out along the railway tracks, was repelled with the loss of one killed and six wounded on the Polish side. The Germans reportedly lost two tanks.
- Around 4:00 PM or 5:30 PM, between 10 and 12 tanks, after an artillery preparation, attacked the positions of the 7th Company of the 40th Infantry Regiment in Wola. The Germans managed to push back a forward Polish outpost but were ultimately repelled, losing three tanks destroyed and one damaged, with seven German soldiers captured.
- Around 10:00 PM in Ochota, the last attack of the day took place. Two German infantry platoons, supported by machine-gun fire, attacked the positions of the 4th Company of the 40th Infantry Regiment and the 6th Company of the 41st Infantry Regiment. After nearly an hour of fighting, the Germans withdrew.

Some Polish authors speculate that the aim of these attacks was to break into the city by surprise, allegedly demanded by the "relentless" commander of the 16th Army Corps, General Hoepner. However, the limited forces involved, along with the timing and duration of these attacks, suggest that the real objective was to divert Polish attention and facilitate the evacuation of damaged combat vehicles that had been abandoned the previous day.

Several captured tanks were towed by the Poles to Piłsudski Square. To boost civilian morale, one of them was put on public display in the Saxon Garden.

== Aftermath ==
The attempt to capture Warsaw resulted in a severe defeat for the German 4th Panzer Division. In the evening communiqué of the Warsaw Defense Command on September 9, it was reported that the enemy had lost 42 tanks destroyed on September 8–9. In reality, the losses of the 4th Panzer Division were even higher. According to Tadeusz Jurga, during the battles of September 8–10, the division may have lost up to half of its initial tank strength. German sources report that the 35th Tank Regiment alone lost 63 out of the 120 tanks it had, with the losses of the 36th Tank Regiment unknown. Some of the tanks, however, were recovered from the battlefield and repaired. Józef Kazimierz Wroniszewski did not rule out that the 4th Panzer Division could have lost up to 120 tanks, with 60 of them being irretrievable.

Polish losses were described by Henryk Stańczyk as "significant". However, the successful repulsion of the first German attack had a positive effect on the morale of both soldiers and the residents of the capital.

The Germans temporarily abandoned their efforts to capture Warsaw through a direct assault. This was due to the defeat they suffered in Ochota and Wola, as well as the start of the Polish counteroffensive along the Bzura river. On the night of September 10–11, the 4th Panzer Division was withdrawn to Piastów, and it was replaced on the positions outside Warsaw by the 31st Infantry Division.

== Commemoration ==
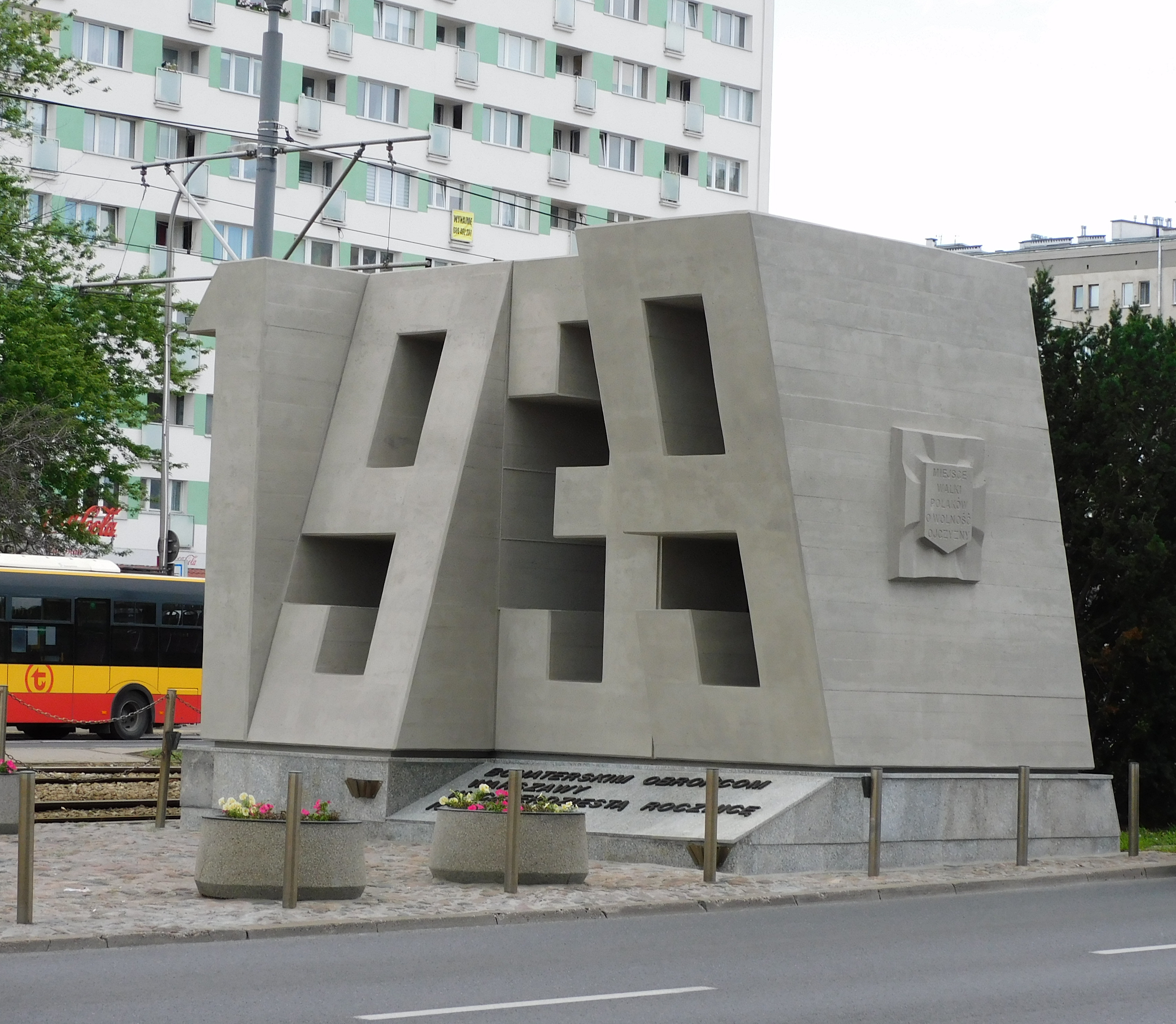
Fragment of the September Barricade Monument

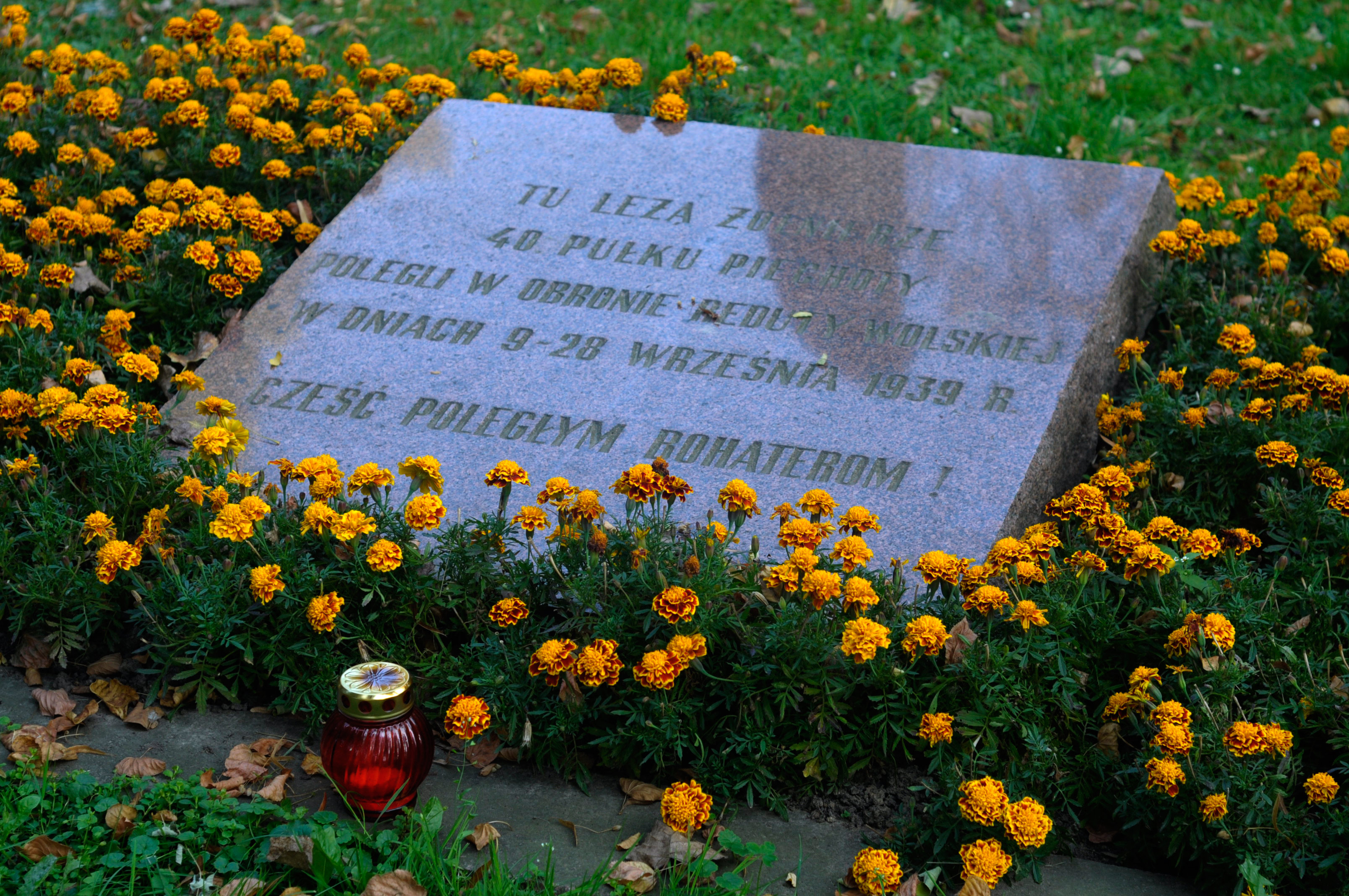
Graves of fallen soldiers of the 40th Infantry Regiment at the site of former Redoubt No. 56

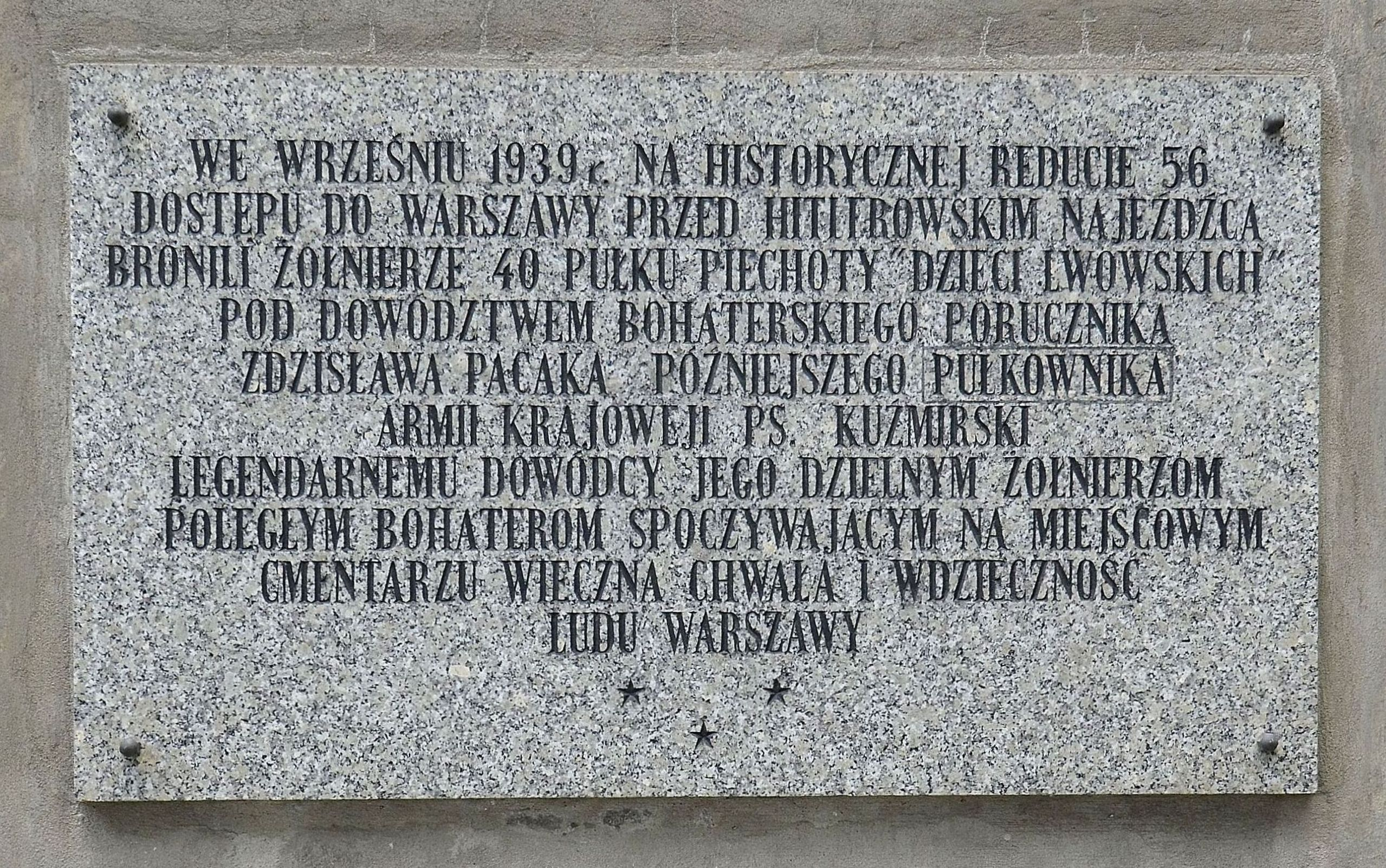
Plaque on the side wall of St. Lawrence's Church commemorating Lieutenant Zdzisław Pacak-Kuźmirski and the soldiers of the 40th Infantry Regiment who fought in the defense of Warsaw in September 1939

The battles fought in defense of Ochota in September 1939 inspired several poems by Jan Janiczek, published clandestinely in 1941, including the most famous one, Ulica Opaczewska.

On 12 September 1979, near the intersection of Grójecka and Opaczewska Streets, the September Barricade Monument, designed by Julian Pałka, was unveiled. It stands at the site of the first Polish barricade from September 1939. The inscription on two of its outer blocks reads:

At this place, soldiers of the Polish Army and residents of Warsaw fought on the barricade to stop advancing Nazi forces, heroically defending access to Warsaw in the unequal battle from 8 September to 27 September 1939.

A tree next to the barricade, known as Topola Obrońców (The Defenders' Poplar), was declared a natural monument in 1981. At the site of former Redoubt No. 56, located at 140A Wolska Street, soldiers of the 40th Infantry Regiment who fell between 9 and 28 September 1939 were buried. On the side wall of the nearby St. Lawrence's Church, a plaque commemorates Lieutenant Zdzisław Pacak-Kuźmirski and the soldiers of the 40th Infantry Regiment who defended Warsaw. The inscription on the plaque reads:

In September 1939, at the historic Redoubt No. 56, soldiers of the 40th Infantry Regiment "Children of Lviv", under the command of the heroic Lieutenant Zdzisław Pacak, later a colonel in the Home Army with the codename Kuźmirski, defended access to Warsaw against the Nazi invaders. Eternal glory and gratitude from the people of Warsaw to the legendary commander, his brave soldiers, and the fallen heroes resting in the local cemetery.

== Bibliography ==
- Dunin-Wąsowicz, Krzysztof (1984). Warszawa w latach 1939–1945 [Warsaw in the Years 1939–1945] (in Polish). Warsaw: Państwowe Wydawnictwo Naukowe. ISBN 83-01-04207-9.
- Dziadziuszko, Krzysztof (2014). "Eugeniusz Niedzielin (1916–1973), pułkownik, szef Sekcji Śledczej Okręgowego Zarządu Informacji nr 8 w Gdyni, oprawca komandorów w tzw. spisku komandorów" [Eugeniusz Niedzielin (1916–1973), Colonel, Head of the Investigation Section of the District Information Board No. 8 in Gdynia, Perpetrator of the So-Called Commander Conspiracy]. Aparat Represji W Polsce Ludowej 1944–1989 (in Polish). 1 (12). Instytut Pamięci Narodowej. ISSN 1733-6996.
- Głowacki, Ludwik (1985). Obrona Warszawy i Modlina na tle kampanii wrześniowej 1939 [The Defense of Warsaw and Modlin Against the Background of the September Campaign of 1939] (in Polish) (V ed.). Warsaw: Wydawnictwo Ministerstwa Obrony Narodowej. ISBN 83-11-07109-8.
- Grzelak, Czesław, ed. (2004). Warszawa we wrześniu 1939 roku. Obrona i życie codzienne [Warsaw in September 1939: Defense and Daily Life] (in Polish). Warsaw: Rytm. ISBN 83-7399-060-7.
- Grzybowski, Jan (1990). 40 pułk piechoty "Dzieci Lwowskich" w obronie Warszawy [40th Infantry Regiment "Children of Lviv" in the Defense of Warsaw] (in Polish). Warsaw: Bellona. ISBN 83-11-07846-7.
- Jurga, Tadeusz (1990). Obrona Polski 1939 [The Defense of Poland 1939] (in Polish). Warsaw: Pax. ISBN 83-211-1096-7.
- Komorowski, Krzysztof, ed. (2014). Warszawa walczy 1939–1945. Leksykon [Warsaw Fights 1939–1945: A Lexicon] (in Polish). Warsaw: Fundacja Warszawa Walczy 1939–1945. ISBN 978-83-1113474-4.
- Wroniszewski, Józef Kazimierz (1984). Barykada września. Obrona Warszawy w 1939 roku [The September Barricade: The Defense of Warsaw in 1939] (in Polish). Warsaw: MON. ISBN 83-11-07012-1.
- Wroniszewski, Józef Kazimierz (1976). Ochota 1939–1945 (in Polish). Warsaw: MON.
- Zarzycki, Piotr (1999). 29 Pułk Artylerii Lekkiej [29th Light Artillery Regiment] (in Polish). Warsaw: Ajaks. ISBN 83-87103-87-X.
- Zawilski, Apoloniusz (2009). Bitwy polskiego września [Battles of the Polish September] (in Polish). Kraków: Znak. ISBN 978-83-240-1214-5.
