= September Barricade Memorial =

Monument in Warsaw, Poland

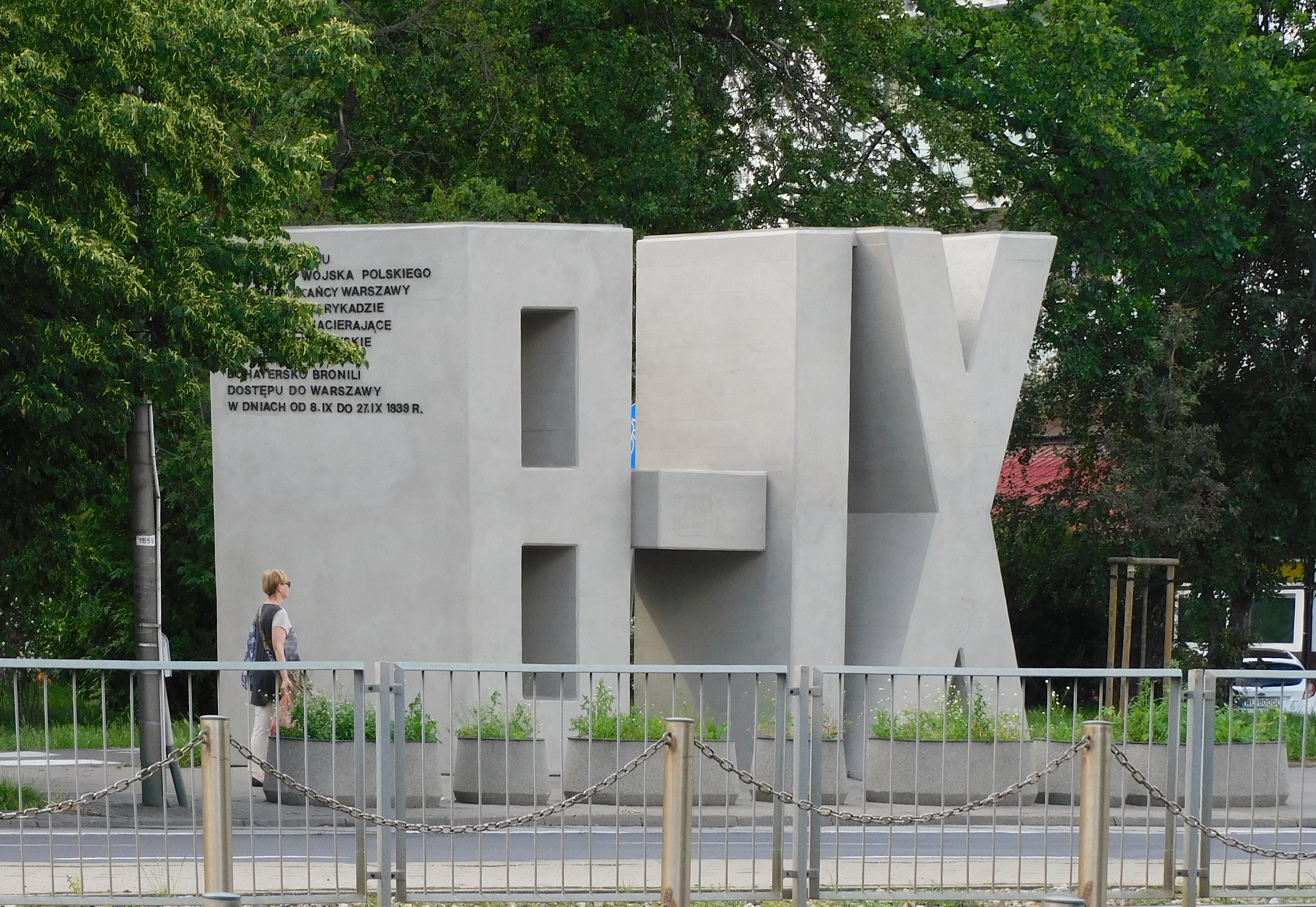
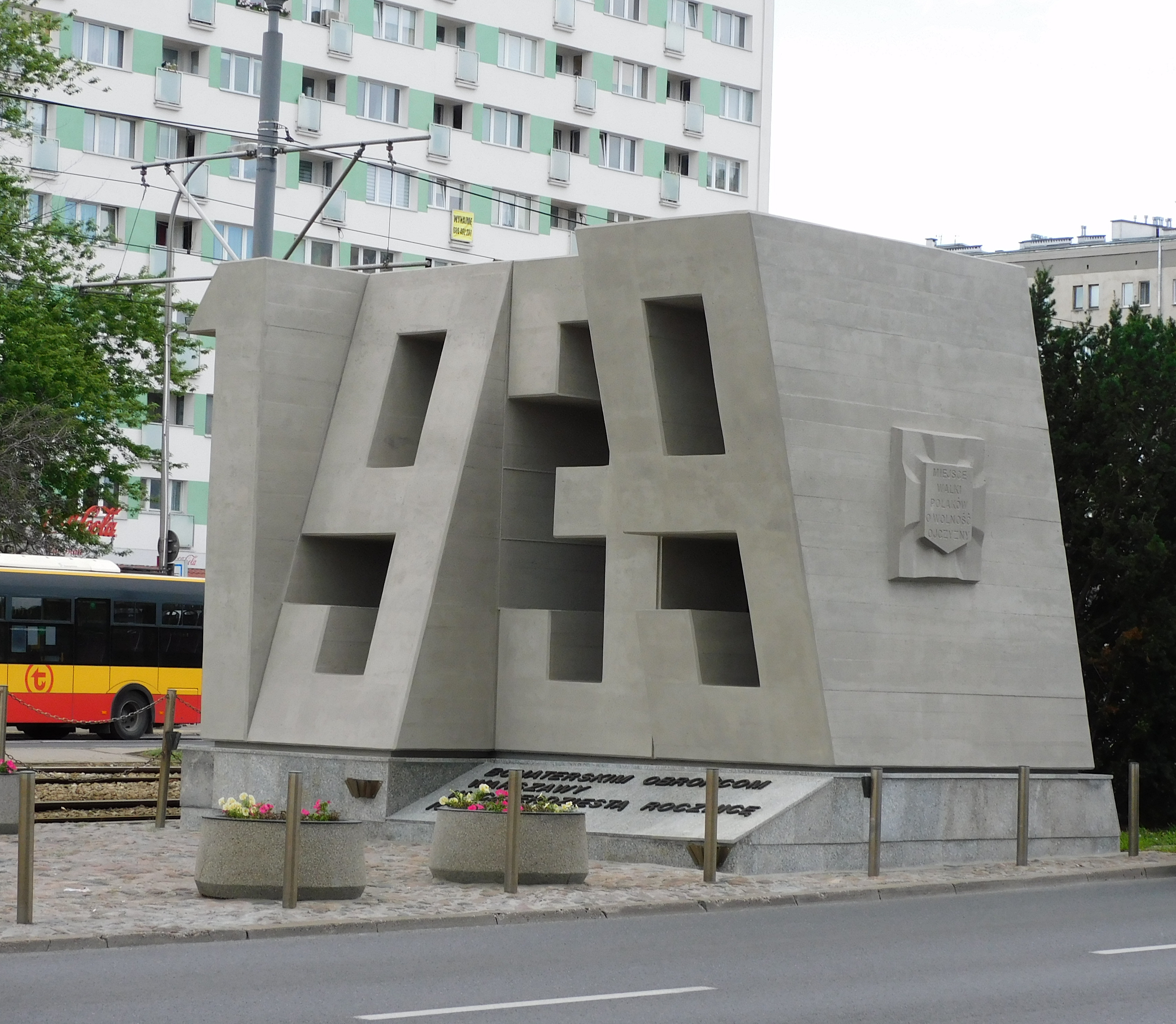
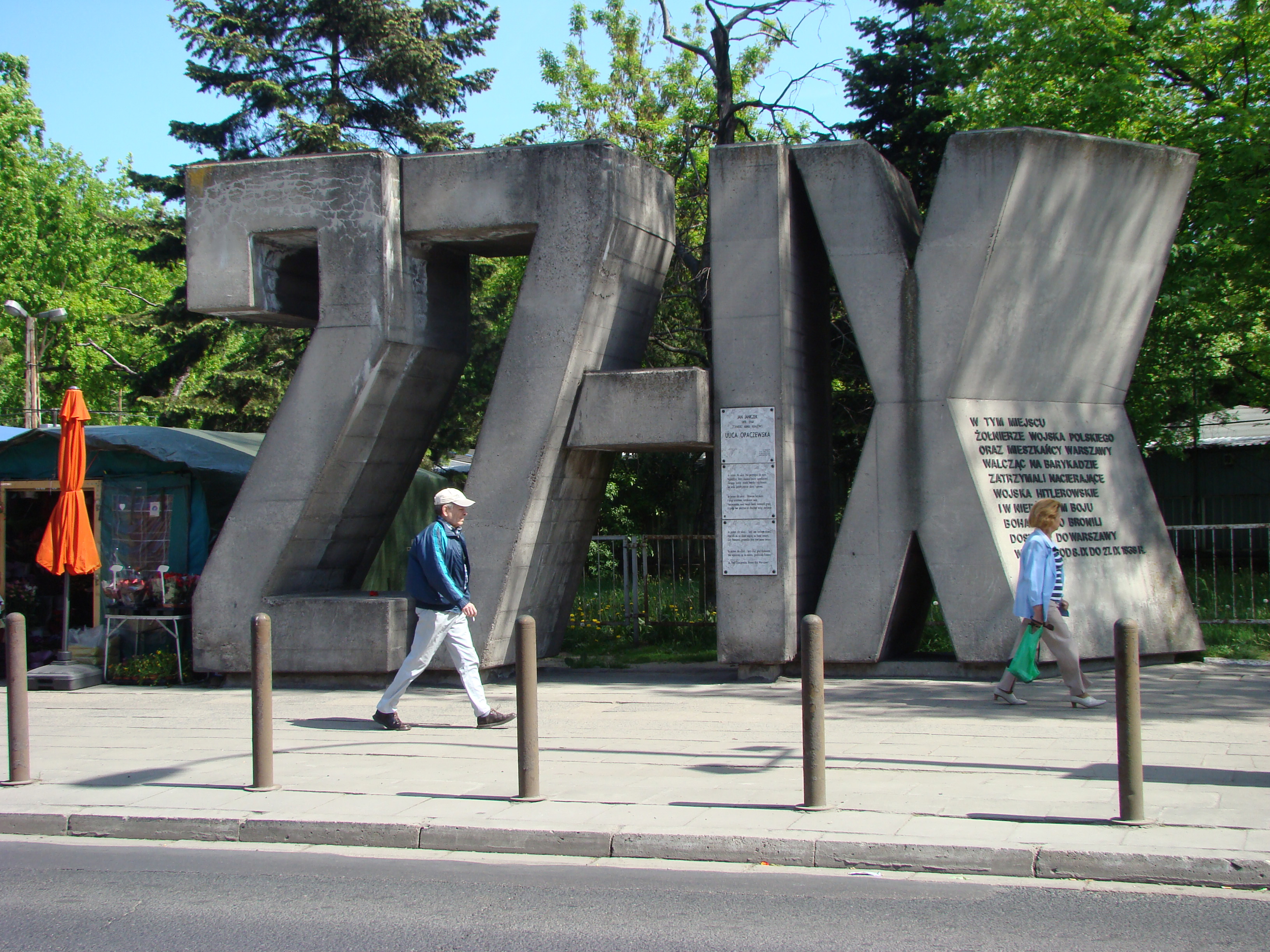
- The three sculptures of the monument.
- Interactive map of September Barricade Memorial
- Location: Grójecka Street, Ochota, Warsaw, Poland
- Coordinates: 52.210259°N 20.975908°E
- Designer: Julian Pałka
- Type: Sculpture
- Material: Concrete
- Opening date: 12 September 1979

The September Barricade Memorial (Polish: Pomnik Barykada Września) is a brutalist mounument in Warsaw, Poland. It is located in the district of Ochota, at Grójecka Street, near the intersection with Opaczewska Street. The monument commemorates a barricade that was constructed by the Polish Armed Forces during the Siege of Warsaw, and used between 8 and 27 September 1939. It consists of three large concrete sculptures, depicting numerals of dates 8-IX (8 September), the day the barricade was erected, 1939, the year of the siege, and 27-IX (27 September), the day the city capitulated. It was designed by Julian Pałka, and unveiled on 12 September 1979.

== History ==
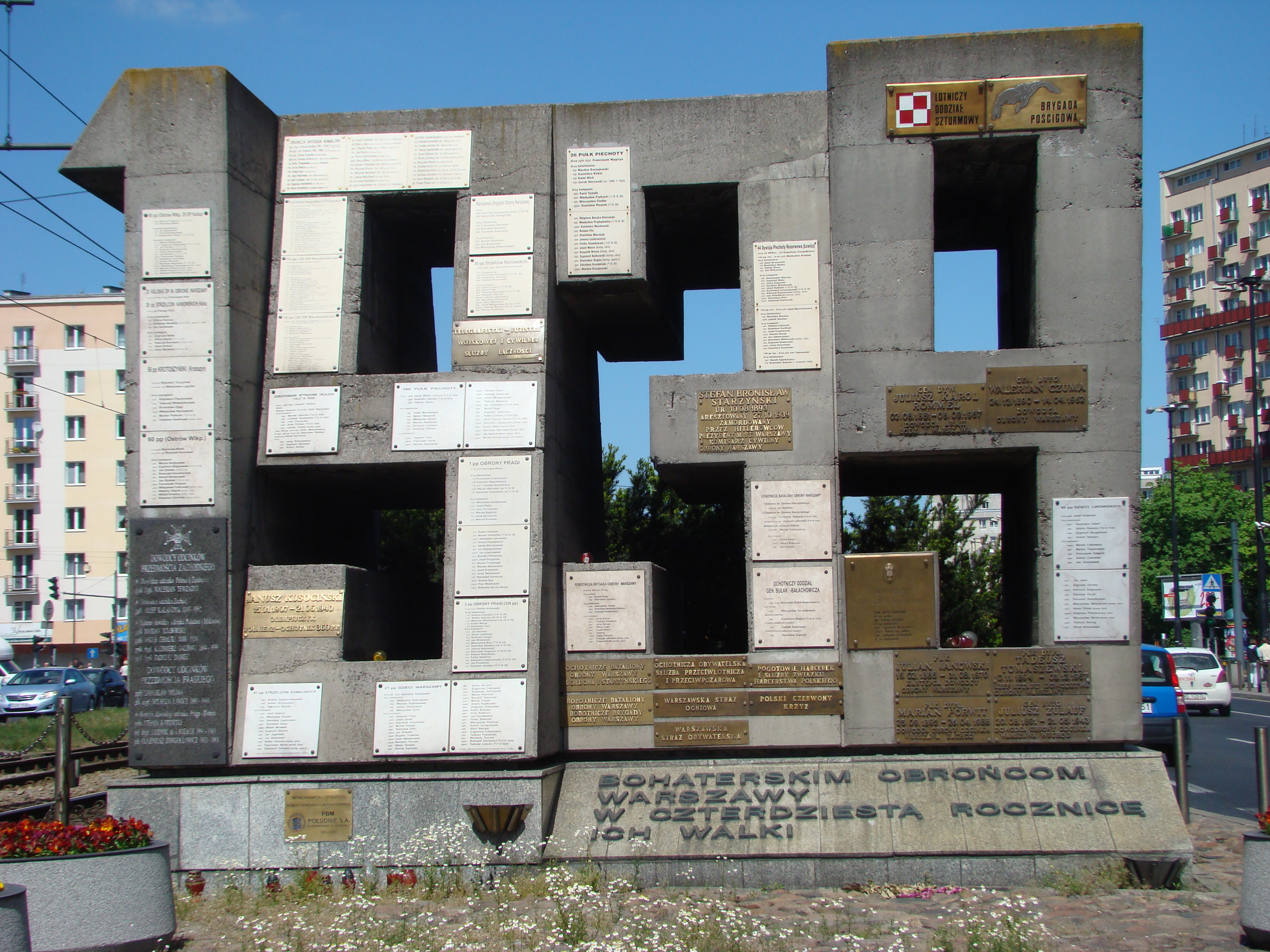
The middle sculpture of the monument in 2009, covered in commemorative plaques that were removed in 2020.

The monument was designed by Julian Pałka, and unveiled on 12 September 1979, as part of the celebrations of the 40th anniversary of the Siege of Warsaw. It was renovated in 2020.

== Characteristics ==
The brutalist mounument was designed to commemorate the barricade that was constructed by the Polish Armed Forces during the Siege of Warsaw. It stood at the intersection of Opaczewska and Grójecka Streets, from 8 to 27 September 1939.

It consists of three large concrete sculptures. Eatch form numerals that represent dates 8-IX (8 September), the day the barricade was erected, 1939, the year of the siege, and 27-IX (27 September), the day the city capitulated. The monument faces to the south, and is placed on the axis of Grójecka Street, near the intersection with Opaczewska Street. Two sculptures sand parallelly to the road, on both of its sides, while the middle one, is placed perpendicularly to the street, between its traffic lanes. It dates to around 1927, and is also named in commemoration of soldiers that defended the city during the siege.

In the past, the sculptures, especially its middle section, featured over 40 commemorative plaques, installed over the years by veteran organisations. They were not envisioned by the original artist, and were removed during the 2020 renovations.

Near the monument grows the Poplar of the Defenders, a Canadian poplar tree with the status of a natural monument. It is also named in commemoration of soldiers who defended the city during the siege.
