= Julian Pałka =

Polish poster artist

Julian Pałka (20 January 1923 - 20 June 2002) was a Polish poster artist.

He was awarded the Medal of the 40th Anniversary of People's Poland.
