= Wola hospitals during the Warsaw Uprising =

Part of the Warsaw Uprising, 1944

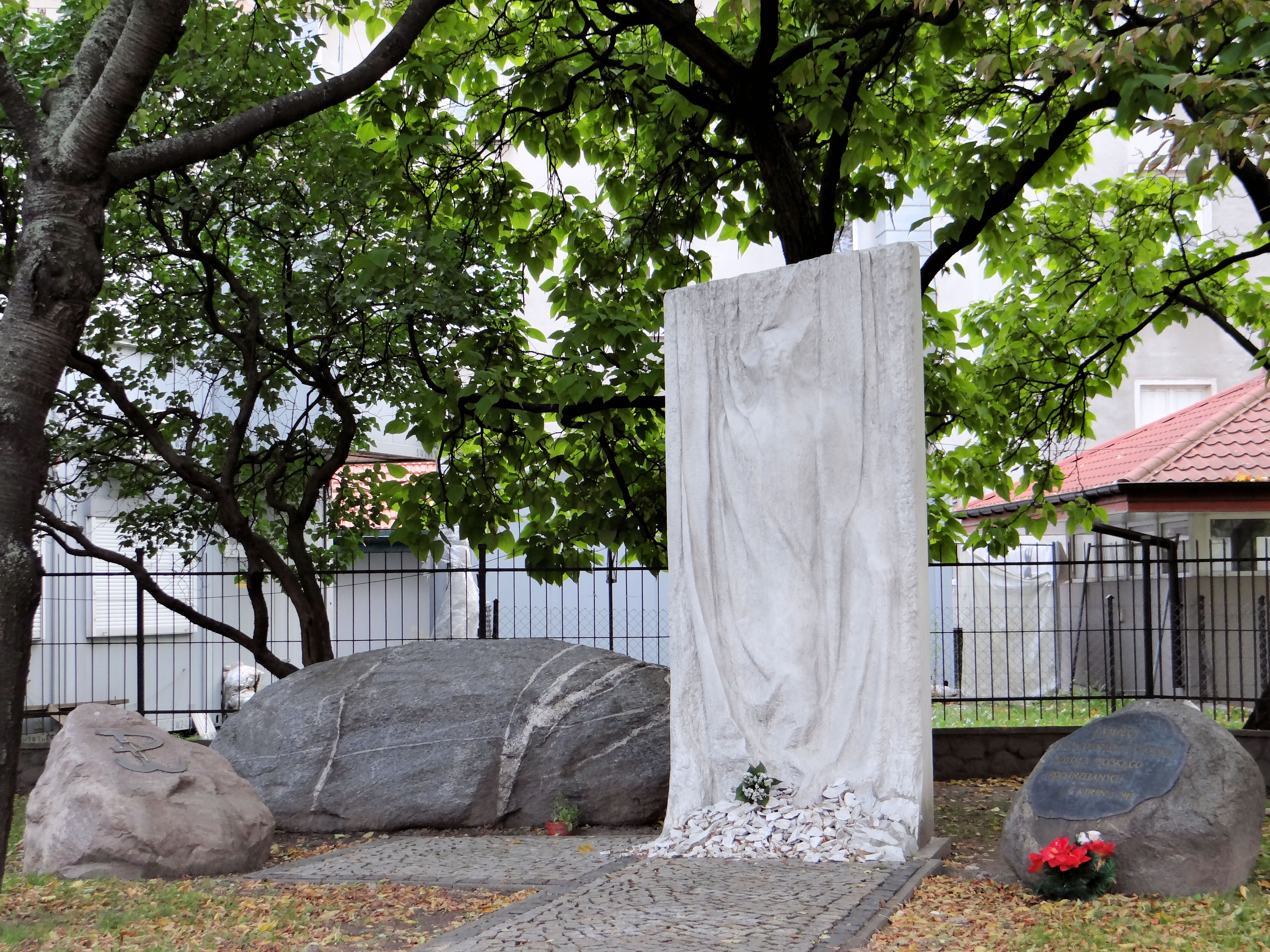
Monument commemorating the victims of the liquidation of Wola Hospital, standing in front of the Institute of Tuberculosis and Lung Diseases

During the Warsaw Uprising in 1944, four hospitals operated in the Wola district of Warsaw.

The most dramatic moment in the wartime history of Wola's hospitals was the mass slaughter of district residents carried out in the first days of the uprising by Schutzstaffel (SS) units and Ordnungspolizei. On "Black Saturday," 5 August 1944, the Germans massacred the staff and patients of the Wola Hospital and the St. Lazarus Hospital. The next day, the patients of the Karol and Maria Children's Hospital also fell victim to the massacre. Thanks to the brave stance of the staff, the St. Stanislaus Infectious Disease Hospital escaped destruction. A few days later, the Wola Hospital also managed to resume its activities. The staff of both facilities provided aid to the Polish civilian population expelled from Warsaw by the Germans until the end of October 1944.

== Wola Hospital ==
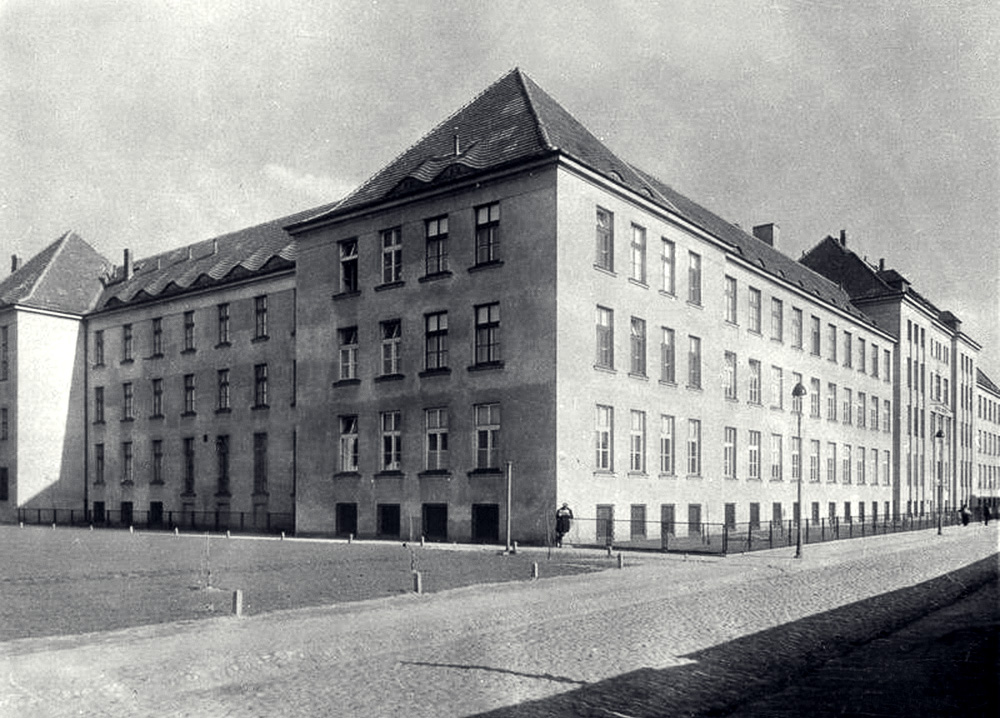
Building of Wola Hospital at 26 Płocka Street (currently the headquarters of the Institute of Tuberculosis and Lung Diseases)

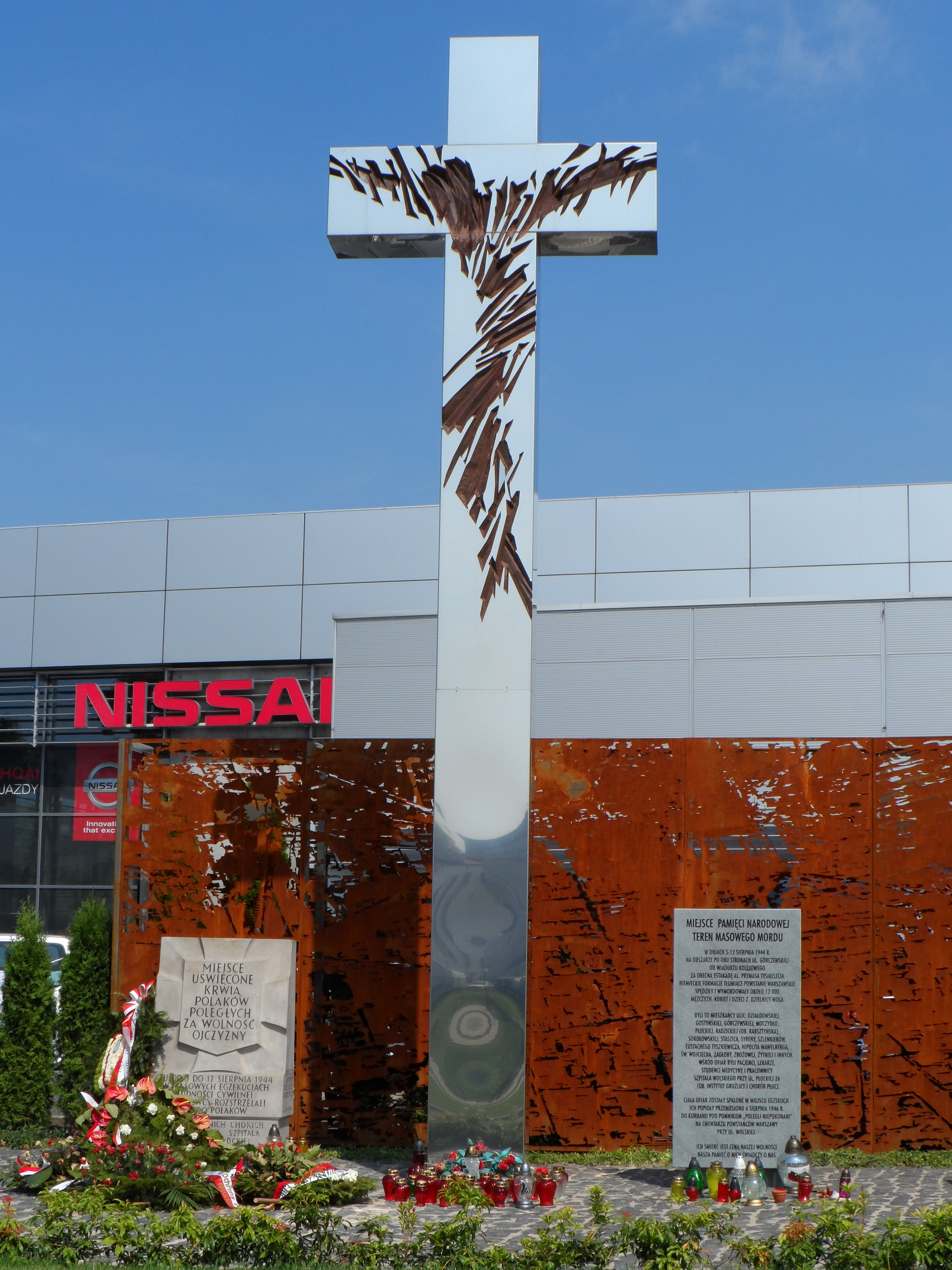
Wola Massacre Memorial on Górczewska Street. During the Wola massacre, up to 12,000 Poles were shot in this area, including 360 patients and staff of Wola Hospital

Wola Hospital was located at 26 Płocka Street. (Note: In 1965, the name of the Wola Hospital was given to Hospital No. 1, located at 17 Marcin Kasprzak Street. Currently, the facility at 26 Płocka Street is called the Institute of Tuberculosis and Lung Diseases. The institute continues the traditions of the pre-war Wola Hospital (Geber (2004, p. 9)).) During the German occupation, the hospital director and head of the surgical department was Dr. Józef Piasecki. Both the director and many other members of the medical and auxiliary staff actively cooperated with the resistance movement. The extent of the staff's involvement in underground activities is evidenced by the fact that in the fall of 1939, meetings of the leadership of the Service for Poland's Victory were held at Wola Hospital. In subsequent years, hospital premises were used for meetings and briefings, including those of the Warsaw District and the leadership of the Government Delegation for Poland. Additionally, underground education of medicine was conducted at the hospital on Płocka Street, weapons and underground press were stored, Jews and individuals sought by the Germans were hidden, and medical assistance was provided to underground soldiers wounded in combat actions. In February 1944, doctors unsuccessfully tried to save the life of Second Lieutenant Bronisław Pietraszewicz, codenamed Lot – the commander of the operation and the first executor of the sentence on SS-Brigadeführer Franz Kutschera.

At the outbreak of the uprising, the facility with 480 beds had 220 patients. Among the staff present were eleven doctors and a group of medical students. The Home Army command planned that Wola Hospital would become the central medical point in Wola after the uprising began. Moreover, before "W" Hour, a medical patrol was formed in the hospital, tasked with providing medical assistance to Home Army soldiers fighting in Ulrychów. The patrol, led by Dr. Kazimierz Drozdowski, included several medical students and some physical workers of the hospital. However, as the Germans quickly dispersed the Wola Subdistrict units advancing on Ulrychów, the patrol members were ultimately forced to stay at Płocka Street. Meanwhile, as a result of the first battles fought on 1 August 1944, Wola Hospital found itself on the border between areas controlled by the insurgents and those under German control. Over the next three days, staff members who had been unable to reach their workplace due to the outbreak of fighting gradually arrived at the hospital. There was also a constant influx of wounded and refugees from quarters of Wola occupied by the Germans. The hospital was repeatedly visited by the chief of sanitary services of the Home Army's Wola Subdistrict.

On August 5, German units under SS-Gruppenführer Heinz Reinefarth launched an assault on Wola. Simultaneously, a mass slaughter of Polish civilians began. That morning, several German aerial bombs fell in the immediate vicinity of the hospital. The insurgent command sent a liaison to Director Piasecki with an order for the immediate evacuation of the hospital to Śródmieście. However, due to the lack of time and, especially, the lack of transport means to evacuate several hundred patients, this order was unfeasible. Shortly afterward, the staff was informed that German soldiers were calling for a doctor on nearby Wolska Street. Professor Janusz Zeyland, who spoke excellent German, went there accompanied by Dr. Leon Manteuffel. During the conversation, a German non-commissioned officer warned the Polish doctors that the Wehrmacht would not harm them, but soon the SS would arrive in the area, and the situation for the Poles in the hospital "would be unenviable".

The first two Germans entered the hospital before noon. They were interested in the building's layout and inspected places from where the insurgents supposedly fired at German soldiers. Finding no evidence to support their accusations, they asked if there were any wounded German soldiers in the hospital. At that time, only one German was being treated at Płocka Street – a Wehrmacht soldier named Schliefacke or Schliffacke (according to other sources – Lübke). The soldiers assured the wounded man that he would soon be evacuated, informing him simultaneously that the hospital would be blown up. After the Germans left, Director Piasecki instructed Dr. Zbigniew Woźniewski to immediately warn the residents of nearby buildings hiding in the hospital's basements about the danger. Several dozen men heeded the warning and escaped to the insurgent-controlled area.

Shortly afterward, (Note: In historical sources, there are divergent information on the exact time when the liquidation of the Wola Hospital began. Dr. Leon Manteuffel-Szoege stated that the German unit captured the hospital at 2:20 PM. Other witnesses indicated 1:00 or 1:30 PM (Ludność cywilna (1974, p. 259); Geber (2004, p. 168); Gursztyn (2014, p. 113); Datner (1962, p. 39)).) a group of SS men, accompanied by soldiers from one of the Azerbaijani collaborationist battalions, entered the building. The SS officer ordered Dr. Piasecki, Professor Zeyland, and the hospital chaplain, Father Kazimierz Ciecierski, to be brought into the director's office. All three were made to stand behind the desk, after which the officer shot them in the head. Soldiers also shot several wounded patients lying in the hospital basement. They then began to brutally expel patients and staff from the building, often accompanied by beatings and looting of personal valuables. In some cases, severely wounded patients and postoperative convalescents were taken directly from hospital rooms (over 20 patients had to be carried on stretchers). Outside the hospital building, the crowd of Poles was formed into a column and marched westward. The route led along Płocka and Górczewska streets, between burning buildings and through piles of corpses. Near the railway viaduct over Górczewska Street, the soldiers began preparing to execute the entire column. However, likely due to the considerable commotion caused among the crowd, the execution was temporarily called off. The group from Wola Hospital was eventually led to the halls of the railway workshops on nearby Moczydło Street.

Thousands of Wola residents had already been gathered in the workshops on Moczydło Street, where they waited in cramped and scorching conditions, without water or food, for a decision on their fate. Upon arrival, the Poles brought from the hospital were segregated – nuns, civilian nurses, doctors, medical students, auxiliary staff, and male and female patients were separated (though as the halls became increasingly crowded, these distinctions began to blur). Between 2:00 and 3:00 PM, men and boys started being taken out of the halls – supposedly to work on dismantling barricades and clearing streets. In small groups, usually from 10 to 12 people, the victims were led to nearby execution sites and shot by machine gun fire. Mass execution sites included areas around the workshops, the courtyard of the house at 51 Górczewska Street, the Simplex boiler factory at 53 Górczewska Street, and especially the yard of the tenement house at the corner of Górczewska Street and the now-nonexistent Zagłoby Street (near the railway tracks). Around 4:30 PM, when most of the healthy and able-bodied men had already been taken out of the halls, the Germans began calling out the remaining men – including patients and staff members of the Wola Hospital. In one of the last groups, doctors and medical students were led to execution. (Note: The information that the doctors and students were led out to their deaths as one of the last was given in his account by Jan Napiórkowski, a student who survived the execution. Maria Gepner-Woźniewska also remembered the events in a similar way. Dr. Janina Misiewicz, on the other hand, claimed that the doctors were led out to the execution as the first – to reassure the other men that they were not in danger (Geber (2004, pp. 169–170)).) The executions continued until late evening. Historians estimate that at least 4,500 district residents were murdered in the Górczewska and Moczydło areas during those days. According to some sources, the number of victims could have reached up to 12,000.

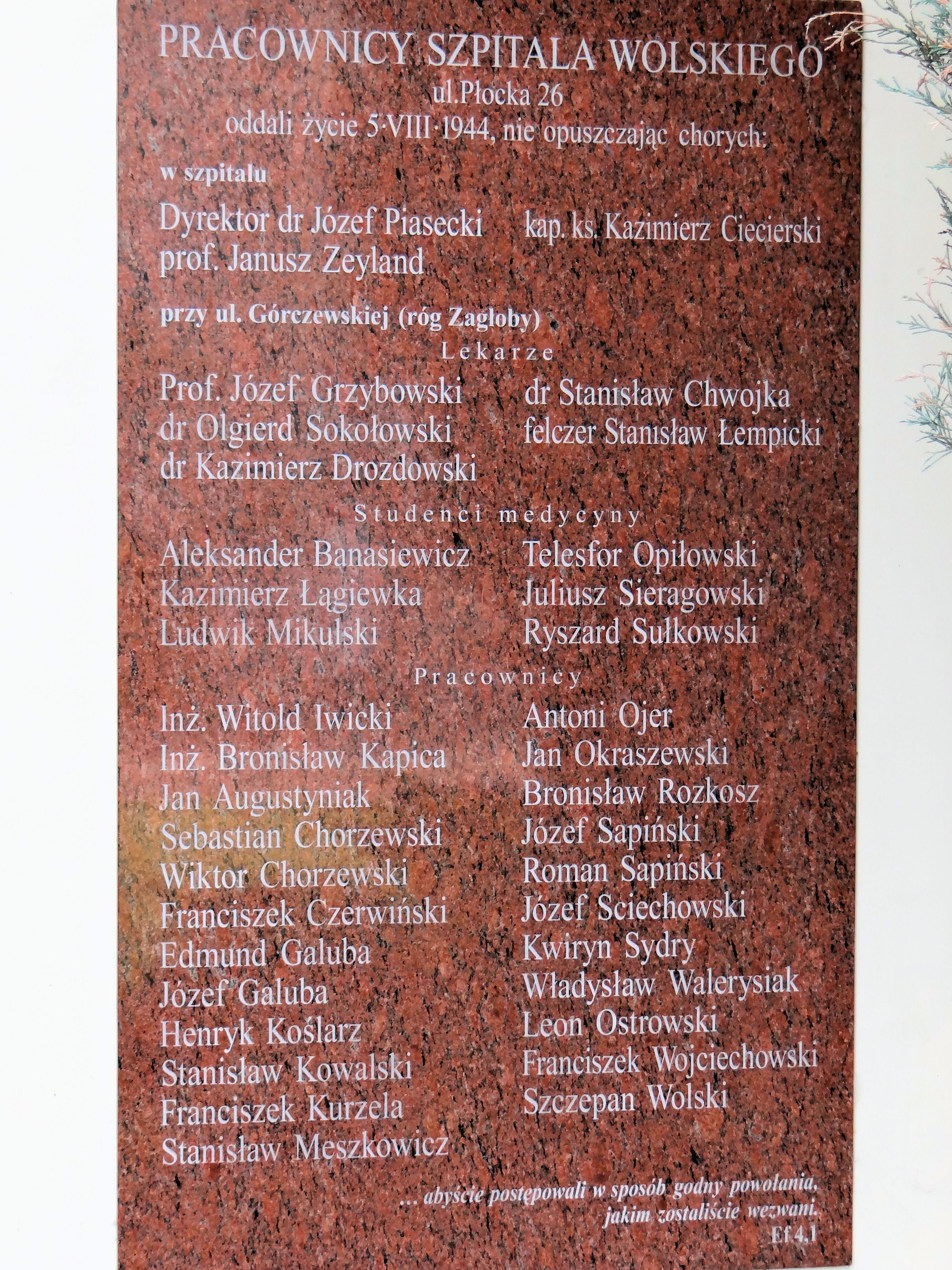
Plaque commemorating the murdered doctors and staff of the Wola Hospital

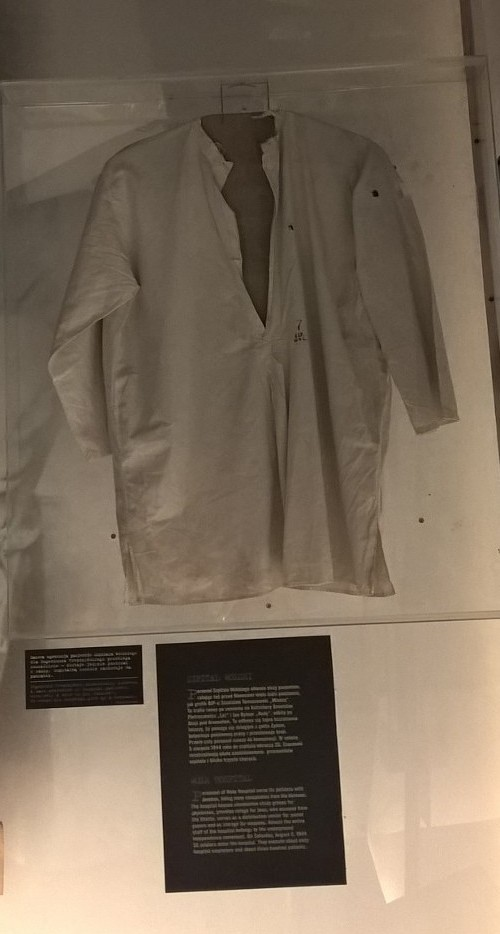
Bullet-riddled shirt belonging to Eugeniusz Trepczyński, a Wola Hospital staff member who survived the massacre on August 5. Warsaw Rising Museum

The liquidation of the Wola Hospital on "Black Saturday," 5 August 1944, resulted in over 360 victims. The Register of places and facts of crimes committed by the Germans during the Warsaw Uprising states that 300 patients and 60 medical and auxiliary staff members were among those shot. Six doctors were murdered – besides Dr. Piasecki and Professor Zeyland, the victims included Professor Dr. Józef Grzybowski, Dr. Olgierd Sokołowski, Dr. Stanisław Chwojka, and Dr. Kazimierz Drozdowski. Long-time Wola Hospital feldsher Stanisław Łempicki, and twenty-three auxiliary male staff members known by name, were also executed. Six medical students, participating in clandestine medical studies conducted under the auspices of the legally operating Private Vocational School for Auxiliary Medical Personnel led by Dr. Jan Zaorski, were also killed. They were Aleksander Banasiewicz, Kazimierz Łągiewka, Ludwik Mikulski, Telesfor Opiłowski, Juliusz Sieragowski, and Ryszard Sułkowski (all of whom were practicing at Wola Hospital). Among the patients and those on hospital grounds, Father Józef Rzychoń of the Congregation of the Mission (prefect of the Silesian seminary in Kraków from 1937 to 1940) and Antoni Braunschweig (a seminarian from the Warsaw seminary) were also killed.

Only a few of the men led out of the hospital managed to survive the Wola massacre. From the group of doctors and students taken to be executed, Jan Napiórkowski escaped at the last moment from the execution site. Two patients, Father Bernard Filipiuk and Eugeniusz Trepczyński, survived the execution by hiding under a pile of corpses. A hospital worker, Wacław Dąbrowski, survived in a similar way. Father Marian Chwilczyński disguised himself as a nun and hid among the Daughters of Charity. A patient using the name Jan Bęcwałek was saved due to his Volksdeutsche status. Surgeons Leon Manteuffel and Stefan Wesołowski, along with nurses Barbara Warda and Irena Dobrzańska, were pulled from the column heading to Moczydło and taken to work at a German dressing station. Soon, both doctors were transported to the area near the railway viaduct over Wolska Street (Dr. Manteuffel reported that it was the courtyard of the Kirchmayer and Marczewski factory at 79/81 Wolska Street), where they encountered three employees from the St. Stanislaus Infectious Disease Hospital. Initially, the Germans did not know what to do with the brought Poles; one SS non-commissioned officer even stated that according to the Führer's order, they should be sent to the devil. Ultimately, however, an order came from Reinefarth's staff to transfer the entire group to St. Stanislaus Hospital.

On the evening of August 5, SS-Obergruppenführer Erich von dem Bach-Zelewski managed to have Hitler's order, which called for the extermination of all Warsaw residents regardless of age and gender, revoked. On the morning of August 6, the Germans led nearly 4,000 survivors from the massacre out of the workshops on Moczydło Street and marched them westward. Among this column were the female staff of the Wola Hospital and the surviving patients. After a nearly hour-and-a-half march, the column was brought into Fort Bema. Before this, however, nurse Anna Wielowieyska managed to escape from the crowd. She alerted the residents of the nearby village of Jelonki, who rushed to help the Warsaw refugees, bringing water, milk, and food. Soon, the Germans agreed to release mothers with small children, allowing nearly 400 people to leave the fort, including almost all the young female doctors and students. Taking advantage of the fact that the fort was manned by Wehrmacht soldiers, Dr. Janina Misiewicz requested the release of all patients and hospital staff members. She was supported by Marian Klimaszewski, the sołtys of Jelonki, who offered to provide food and shelter for the hospital. After some hesitation, the German commander granted these requests. By the end of the day, 140 patients and 92 hospital staff members were settled in the village (including 4 doctors, 8 students, 34 Daughters of Charity, 4 certified nurses, and 42 auxiliary workers). Many healthy refugees also managed to leave the fort, disguised as wounded and sick individuals by the hospital staff.

=== Fate of the hospital after August 5 ===
Despite earlier threats, the Germans did not blow up the Wola Hospital. This decision was likely influenced by the presence of a patient named Jan Laski (or Łaski), a wealthy merchant who claimed to be a German citizen but was actually a Polish Jew who had spent most of his life in Germany. His wife, also Jewish, was critically ill in the hospital. The Laskis had previously been in the Warsaw Ghetto but managed to escape. By paying substantial bribes to the Warsaw Gestapo, Laski ensured safety for himself and his wife, obtaining documentation that deemed him "important to the German war effort". When the liquidation of the hospital began on August 5, Laski protested loudly in German, drawing the attention of an officer. After reviewing Laski's documents, the officer decided to take him to the headquarters, but Laski agreed only if his wife received care and protection. The officer left a German guard with her and appointed Dr. Zbigniew Woźniewski, who was pulled from the column heading to Moczydło, to care for her. Laski went to the German headquarters, where Major Max Reck issued him a pass for unrestricted movement through all German checkpoints. Since evacuating the Laskis from Warsaw was temporarily impossible, the Germans postponed the demolition of the hospital.

Dr. Woźniewski soon realized that he was not the only Pole remaining in the hospital. The Germans had evacuated the building hastily, leaving behind one wing containing the tuberculosis ward and two rooms with a few wounded insurgents. They also temporarily left some patients unable to move on their own. As a result, on the morning of August 6, there were still 98 patients at the hospital, including 34 women. Hospital attendants Jadwiga Zubkowicz and Maria Śliwińska, as well as Sister Lucyna Lange, remained in the building. The head of the hospital office, Wójcicki, also avoided execution by hiding in a coal heap. During the night of 5 to 6 August, a fire from nearby burning houses spread to a coal and wood shed adjacent to the hospital. Woźniewski, Laski, and three women spent the entire night fighting the fire. The firefighting effort was challenging because they had to be as quiet as possible to avoid attracting the attention of the Germans, who might have killed the remaining patients. The women had to slide down the stair railings to reach the fire extinguishers unnoticed.

On August 6, the Germans set up a sanitary point in the Wola Hospital. That afternoon, they brought the staff and surviving patients from the burned Karol and Maria Hospital on Leszno Street to Płocka Street. Nurses Barbara Warda and Irena Dobrzańska also returned to the hospital, assisting with its operations during their breaks from the German dressing station. The arrival of more doctors and nurses enabled full care for the patients, whose number increased to 189, including 36 children. Survivors from the Wola massacre, many of whom were injured, also began to arrive at the hospital. With the hospital's operations resumed, Dr. Woźniewski assumed the role of acting director ("chief physician"), while Dr. Tadeusz Hroboni from the Karol and Maria Hospital took charge of the surgical department (replaced on September 9 by Dr. Leon Manteuffel). Wanda Moenke became the head nurse. In the following weeks, the hospital staff expanded with doctors, nurses, and Daughters of Charity from other parts of Warsaw captured by the Germans. On August 8, Dr. Woźniewski managed to establish contact with Dr. Janina Misiewicz and her team, who had been in Jelonki for two days.

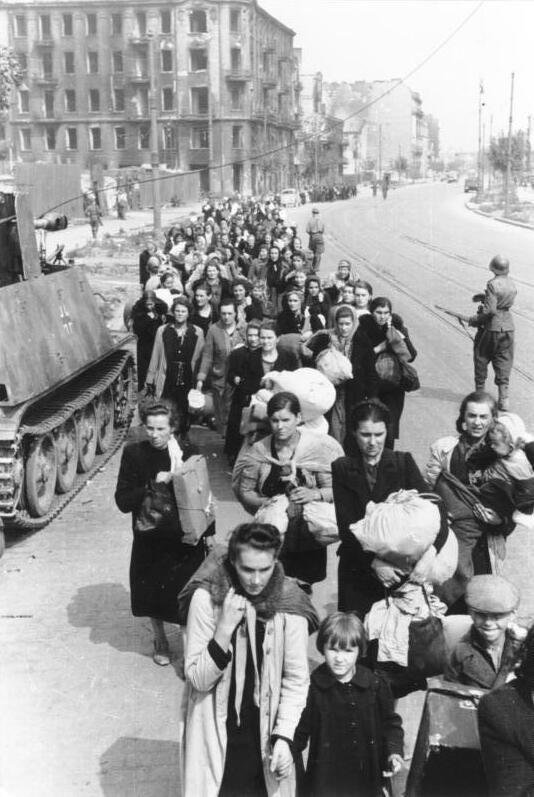
Polish civilians driven down Wolska Street. Hundreds of similar refugees found care and protection at the Wola Hospital

During this time, Wola was a critical route for the Germans to lead Polish civilians from the city. Typically, exiles were marched through the district to the church of St. Wojciech at 76 Wolska Street, which was converted into an assembly point. After a short stay, they were transported through the Warszawa Zachodnia station to the transit camp in Pruszków. Dr. Woźniewski vigorously organized aid for the wounded, sick, and exhausted. Thanks to his efforts, the Wola Hospital became, according to Dr. Stefan Wesołowski, a relatively safe haven for Warsaw survivors. Patients from hospitals and residents of care facilities in districts captured by the Germans (Old Town, Powiśle, some quarters of Śródmieście) were housed there. (Note: Patients brought to the Wola Hospital included those from: the Maltese Hospital on Senatorska Street (August 15–16), the Polish Red Cross Hospital on Smolna Street (September 8–9), the Children's Hospital on Kopernika Street, St. Rocha's Hospital on Krakowskie Przedmieście, and the makeshift hospital in the Visitationist Church (September 18). Nearly 200 elderly people from the Warsaw Charitable Society's home on Krakowskie Przedmieście were also sent there (September 23–24) (Woźniewski (1974, pp. 69, 78–79, 85, 88–89); Geber (2004, pp. 28, 184, 190); Exodus Warszawy (1992, pp. 392–393)).) Due to the large number of people in need, the hospital was almost always overcrowded. In September, the number of people in the hospital exceeded 900. Dr. Leon Manteuffel stated that at peak times, the hospital, which had 500 beds, accommodated about 2,000 patients – not counting staff or healthy refugees.

The assistance provided to the exiled was not limited to medical issues. The Wola Hospital had the right to independently evacuate the sick and wounded from Warsaw, bypassing the "selection" process at the transit camp in Pruszków. Through the courage and ingenuity of hospital staff, hundreds of Warsaw residents were saved from deportation to concentration camps or forced labor in Germany. Many notable figures in Polish science and culture found refuge in the hospital, including Maria Rodziewiczówna and Zofia Kossak-Szczucka. Numerous clergy and undercover insurgents were also saved. Starting from September 7, Dr. Woźniewski regularly visited St. Wojciech's Church under the pretext of "sanitary inspection", from where he managed to free many prisoners despite the oversight of Gestapo agents from the Sonderkommando Spilker. The most spectacular operation took place on September 23, when Dr. Woźniewski and his collaborators evacuated 20 Home Army soldiers captured in Solec from the church against German orders. Janina Pecyna-Sielewicz estimated that hospital staff managed to rescue up to 510 refugees from St. Wojciech's Church. According to the same source, between August 15 and October 25, 1944, the hospital's staff evacuated 1,220 people from Warsaw on their own.

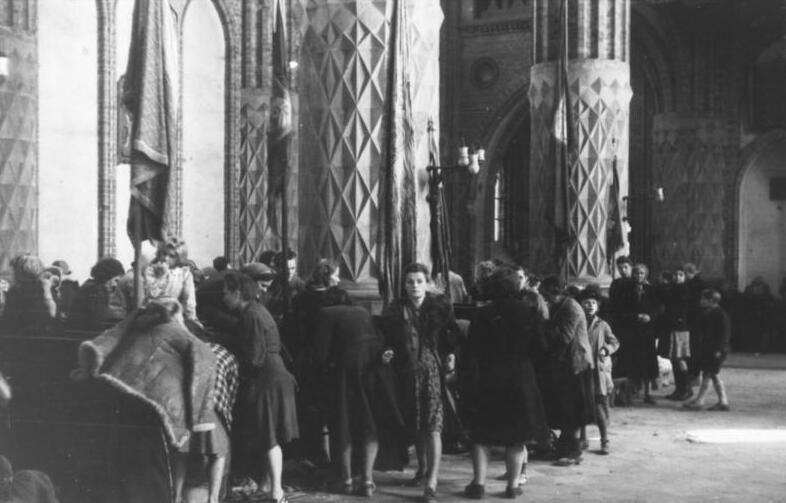
Transit camp in St. Wojciech's Church at Wolska Street

The ability to help the exiled significantly increased when, after the fall of the Old Town (September 2), medical student Edward Kowalski arrived at the assembly point in St. Wojciech's Church. Within a few days, he established contact with the Wola Hospital staff and, with their help, organized an efficient medical point in the church. Kowalski and his medical team, consisting of a paramedic and eight nurses, provided medicines, food, and first aid to the refugees. More severe cases were directed to the Wola Hospital. The operational freedom of Kowalski's group significantly increased after a visit from the International Red Cross delegation, which inspected the conditions in the church on September 10.

The staff of Wola Hospital faced numerous difficulties and dangers during this period. Unable to rely on German assistance, they had to secure food supplies independently. Initially, food was procured within the Wola district, including from the partially burned "House of Nuns" at 9 Górczewska Street. Later, they organized provisioning expeditions outside Warsaw, especially to Pruszków and Ożarów Mazowiecki. The only source of water was a well located in the garden. Restarting the boiler room, essential for heating the hospital and maintaining constant kitchen operations, posed a significant challenge. Due to constant looting, it was necessary to carefully hide hospital equipment and supplies of clothing and bandages. Ensuring the building's protection from German demolition units burning neighboring houses, and safeguarding patients and staff from marauders from eastern collaboration units, required considerable courage and diplomatic skills. (Note: One account of German crimes in Wola, filed before the end of the occupation, included the information that between 18 and 20 August, the Germans shot in the courtyard of the Wola Hospital a group of patients whom three members of the Hitlerjugend had earlier identified as helping the insurgents. However, this information is not confirmed by other sources on the insurgent fate of the hospital (Serwański (1946, pp. 71–72)).) The threat increased particularly after August 24, when the German medical point, whose presence had provided the hospital with relative safety, moved to the courthouse building on Leszno Street. In mid-September, the Germans for the first time announced the evacuation of the hospital from Warsaw. However, they temporarily abandoned this plan, and on the designated day, instead of evacuation wagons, they sent staff and patients from three downtown hospitals to Płocka Street (September 18).

The capitulation of the uprising and the cessation of the German operation to expel the residents of the capital also marked the end of the Wola Hospital's activities. On 17 October 1944, Dr. Otto Lambrecht, the German authorities' representative for the evacuation of Warsaw hospitals, announced that the Wola Hospital would be closed within a few days. At that time, about 600 people were still at Płocka Street, including 456 wounded and sick. The hospital management began gradually evacuating patients and hospital equipment to centers in Podkowa Leśna, Pszczelin, and Olszanka. Several hundred wounded and sick were also sent by evacuation train to Kraków. By October 24, all patients had left the Wola Hospital, and some equipment had been transported away. Only 21 staff members, led by Dr. Woźniewski, remained at Płocka Street, waiting for the promised vehicles from Dr. Lambrecht (intended to transport the remaining hospital equipment). However, on October 28, at 1:00 PM, a German soldier appeared at the hospital and announced that the Polish staff had to leave the facility within two hours. Three days earlier, a ban on civilians staying in Warsaw had come into effect, resulting in the group of Poles being detained by German gendarmes at one of the checkpoints. The hospital staff was saved from execution by an intervention at the German "evacuation headquarters", where Dr. Woźniewski encountered a known official.

=== Suburban branches of Wola Hospital ===
From August 6, a branch of Wola Hospital operated in the Warsaw suburb of Jelonki, directed by Dr. Janina Misiewicz. 140 patients evacuated from the halls at Moczydło were placed in a fire station, an abandoned house belonging to a Volksdeutsche named Kundt, and in private homes of Polish farmers. The hospital staff also found shelter in these private homes. A kitchen was organized in the local kindergarten, and an outpatient clinic was quickly established, which also served the residents of Jelonki. However, the working conditions were extremely difficult due to a lack of food, medicines, bandages, medical equipment, and even dishes and cutlery for the hospital kitchen. In these circumstances, the support provided by the residents of Jelonki was invaluable, and their generosity is consistently highlighted in the recollections and accounts of the hospital staff.

On August 8, nurse Anna Wielowieyska managed to establish contact with the hospital on Płocka Street, from where essential equipment and funds from the hospital’s cash reserves were transported by carts. Dr. Woźniewski and his team used the same route to evacuate patients and healthy individuals hiding in the hospital from Warsaw. As the influx of refugees continued, the number of patients in the Jelonki branch grew (by August 11, there were already about 160). (Note: During the period of operation of the Wola Hospital branch in Jelonki, fifteen patients treated there died (Geber (2004, p. 173)).) Despite the generosity of the local population, Jelonki could not sustain or accommodate such a large number of people in need. Moreover, the village was too close to the fighting in Warsaw, exposing patients and staff to German reprisals. Therefore, Dr. Misiewicz decided to find a new location for the hospital, transforming Jelonki into an outpatient point and a kind of "transit station" connecting the new headquarters with the hospital on Płocka Street. With the support of the Health Center management in Pruszków, arrangements were made for the casino building in Podkowa Leśna to be used for hospital purposes (August 11). The first transport from the Jelonki hospital, consisting of 50 patients and 21 staff members led by Dr. Wiwa Jaroszewicz, was relocated there the following day. Another group of patients and staff, totaling about 100 people, arrived in Podkowa on August 17. Only 70 patients and 19 staff members remained in Jelonki under the leadership of Dr. Halina Krzywiec.

Dr. Misiewicz’s decision proved to be correct very quickly. On August 18, the Germans conducted a major roundup in Jelonki, resulting in the deportation of nearly all the young men and women in the village to the Pruszków camp. Five Daughters of Charity working at the hospital were also caught in the roundup but were released the next day and directed to work at the facility in Podkowa Leśna. In the following days, the remaining patients in Jelonki were gradually transported to the hospital in Podkowa Leśna. In the meantime, a unit of Kalmyks stationed in Jelonki committed continuous looting and assaults on women (only the hospital staff enjoyed relative immunity). The operation of the Jelonki branch of Wola Hospital ended on September 7, when the Germans completely burned the village and deported its residents to the Pruszków camp. The remaining patients and hospital staff in Jelonki were transported to Podkowa Leśna.

The hospital in Podkowa Leśna initially operated in the building of the local casino run by Volksdeutsche Kłaczyńskis. Two large restaurant halls, the kitchen, and several smaller rooms were allocated for hospital purposes. Initially, the Central Welfare Council treated this facility as a unit under its jurisdiction and therefore appointed the doctors in charge. However, on August 16, the hospital in Podkowa Leśna was officially recognized as a branch of Wola Hospital. Dr. Janina Misiewicz assumed the role of the facility's director, while Dr. Wiwa Jaroszewicz became the chief physician. It quickly became apparent that the casino could not accommodate all the patients. The hospital management managed to secure the use of the Krychów villa belonging to the director of the Warsaw Commuter Railway, Tadeusz Baniewicz, for hospital purposes through negotiations with the Central Welfare Council and the local government in Helenów (August 16). Due to difficult material conditions, the Podkowa Leśna branch operated in a provisional manner for many weeks. However, in September and especially in October 1944, transports of medical equipment evacuated from the hospital on Płocka Street began arriving in Podkowa Leśna. This enabled the organization of a surgical ward (50 beds), a ward for tuberculosis and internal diseases (100 beds), a laboratory, and an X-ray room.

The local population was significantly less generous than the residents of Jelonki, but the hospital received comprehensive support from Warsaw Commuter Railway workers. Supplies of food, fuel, medicines, and bandages were obtained through efforts with the Central Welfare Council branch in Podkowa Leśna, the local government in Helenów, German authorities in Grodzisk Mazowiecki, and assistance from institutions and individuals, often from distant locations. At its peak, the Podkowa Leśna branch housed 220 patients at one time. It also temporarily supervised the hospital in Biskupice (Note: The hospital in Biskupice was organized by Dr. Hieronim Powiertowski shortly after some 80 wounded evacuated from the Children's Hospital on Kopernik Street in Warsaw were transferred to this location. The Podkowa Leśna branch of the Wola Hospital formally belonged to this hospital since September 10. Employees of the Podkowa hospital helped the staff of the Biskupice hospital in caring for the wounded and shared dressing supplies and medicines. By the end of 1944, the Biskupice hospital was liquidated (Geber (2004, pp. 198–199)).) (30 beds). Initially, most of the wounded and sick came from the Jelonki branch. Later, patients from the hospital on Płocka Street and the wounded and sick from the Pruszków transit camp were directed there. Along with the wounded, sick, and convalescents, insurgents or people threatened by the Germans, who were helped to escape by the hospital staff, were also brought to Podkowa. Between late August and late September 1944, the Podkowa Leśna branch employed about 150 staff members – including four doctors, several medical students, several Daughters of Charity, three secular nurses, and over 100 physical workers (among whom there were only three men). As new suburban branches of the Wola Hospital were established, the number of staff members gradually decreased. By December 1944, only 68 people were working at the Podkowa Leśna hospital. However, it continued to function as a sort of headquarters for Wola Hospital.

By the end of September 1944, the hospital in Podkowa Leśna was at risk of overcrowding. Dr. Janina Misiewicz began searching for a new location for another branch of the Wola Hospital. She chose Olszanka in Puszcza Mariańska, previously a popular holiday resort for Warsaw’s intelligentsia. Patients and staff were accommodated in a private villa belonging to the Gall family and in the pre-war correctional facility for boys (known as Czerwoniak). Initially, the buildings were ill-suited for hospital purposes, lacking essential equipment and beds, forcing many patients to use mattresses or straw bedding. Over time, conditions improved thanks to deliveries of medical supplies and equipment from the hospital on Płocka Street. An operating room and outpatient clinic for the local population were soon established in Olszanka, and the hospital had 150 beds. Food and fuel supplies were supplemented through allocations from the Central Welfare Council and donations from institutions and private individuals. Additional food products were sometimes received as payment for treating Germans or local residents. Surgical patients and undercover insurgents from Warsaw were primarily sent to Olszanka. Despite difficult conditions, mortality among the wounded and sick was very low.

After the fall of the uprising, the Olszanka branch of the Wola Hospital employed several notable doctors, including Dr. Felicjan Loth, Drs. Leon and Barbara Manteuffel, Dr. Kunegunda Kontrym, Dr. Jan Nowicki, and medical student Edward Kowalski, who previously headed a sanitary point at St. Wojciech's Church. Dr. Janina Misiewicz also chose this location for her headquarters. At her initiative, a conference for doctors and students from all three branches of the Wola Hospital was held in Olszanka on from 6 to 7 January 1945.

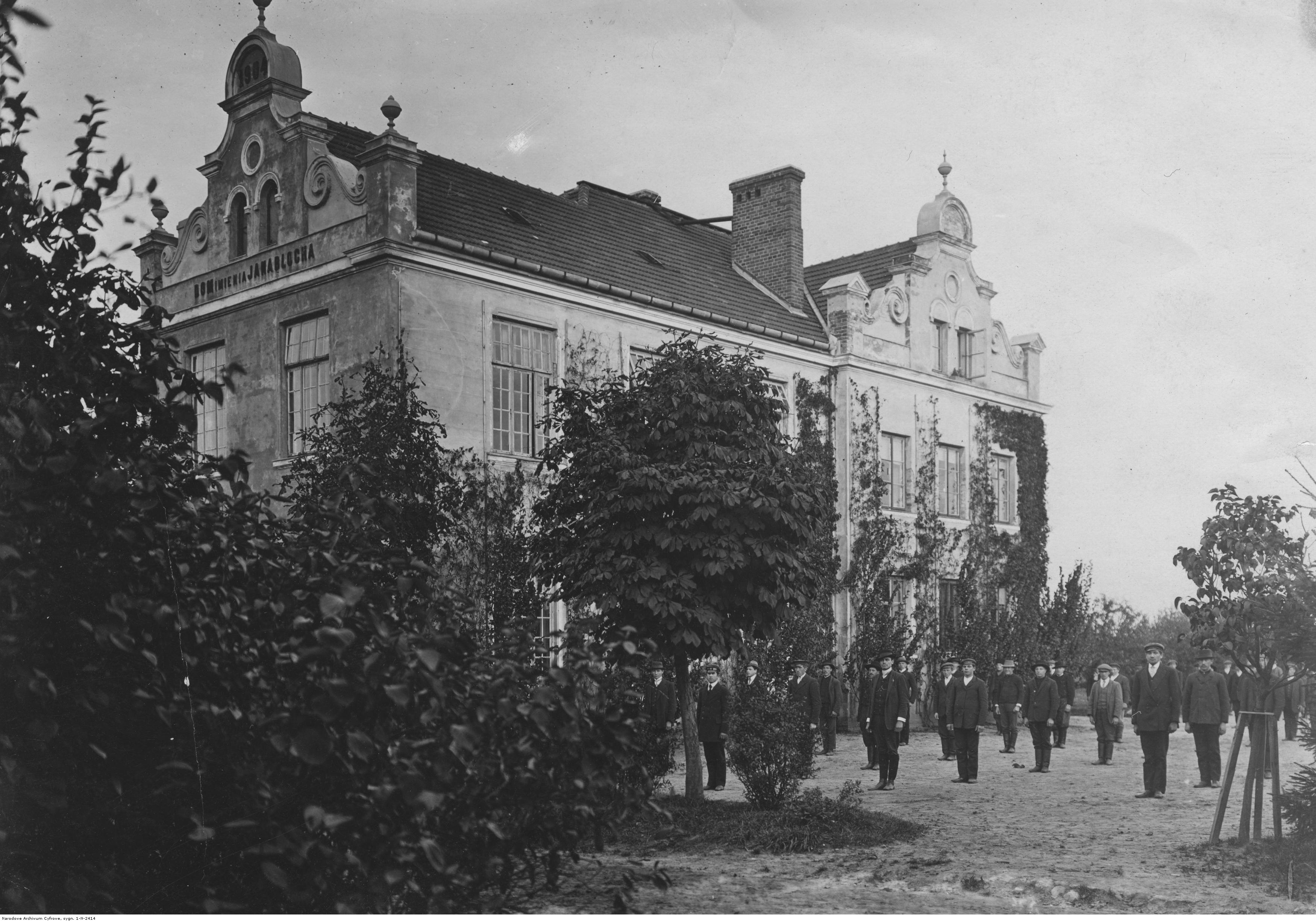
Building of the State Agricultural School in Pszczelin, which housed one of the branches of the Wola Hospital

In October, with the impending evacuation of the hospital on Płocka Street announced by the Germans, the management had to organize another suburban branch. After intensive searching, Dr. Misiewicz and Dr. Jaroszewicz obtained permission to use the building of the State Agricultural School in Pszczelin near Brwinów for hospital purposes. Patients, mainly surgical cases, were directed there from October 20. Gradually, various equipment was transported from the Wola Hospital to Pszczelin. The last such transport took place between November 2 and 3, when a truck provided by Dr. Lambrecht moved a significant amount of hospital equipment from the vacant Płocka building to the new branch. The hospital in Pszczelin had from 80 to 100 beds. The housing conditions were relatively good, although there was no sewage system, and due to insufficient room, staff members lived in provisional conditions. The facility's operations were hampered by power outages and severe cold due to a lack of fuel. There were also instances of patients and staff suffering from malnutrition. Efforts were made to obtain food through allocations from the Central Welfare Council and the Polish Red Cross, the Brwinów municipal authorities, and private donations. Sixteen patients died in the first three months of operation. In December 1944, the German authorities arbitrarily decided to evacuate the hospital. On the designated day, the first 50 patients were transported by cars to the railway station in Brwinów, only to find that the evacuation train did not arrive due to a Soviet air raid (December 16). As a result, the patients were returned to Pszczelin, and the Germans abandoned the idea of closing the hospital.

The Vistula–Oder offensive of the Red Army brought the liberation of Warsaw and its suburbs from German occupation. On 18 January 1945, the first group of Wola Hospital staff, led by Dr. Misiewicz, returned to the ruined capital. Soon, the number of patients in all three branches began to decrease. The resumption of operations at the hospital on Płocka Street also prompted many staff members to return to Warsaw. The Pszczelin facility ceased operations on March 24, and the Olszanka hospital closed on June 25. The branch in Podkowa Leśna was the last to function, remaining operational until September 1945.

== St. Stanislaus Infectious Diseases Hospital ==
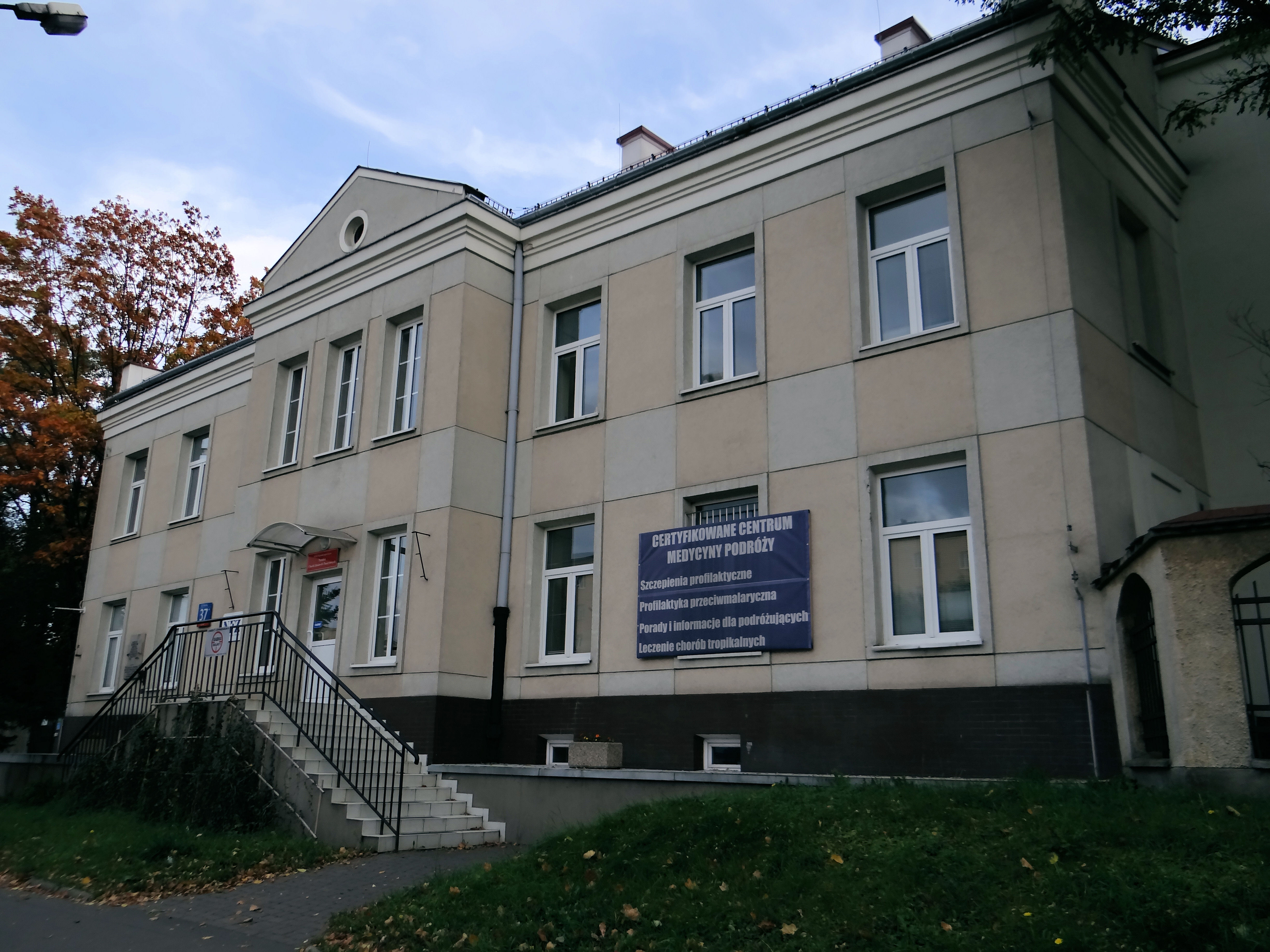
Building of the former St. Stanislaus Hospital at 37 Wolska Street (now the site of the Provincial Infectious Diseases Hospital)

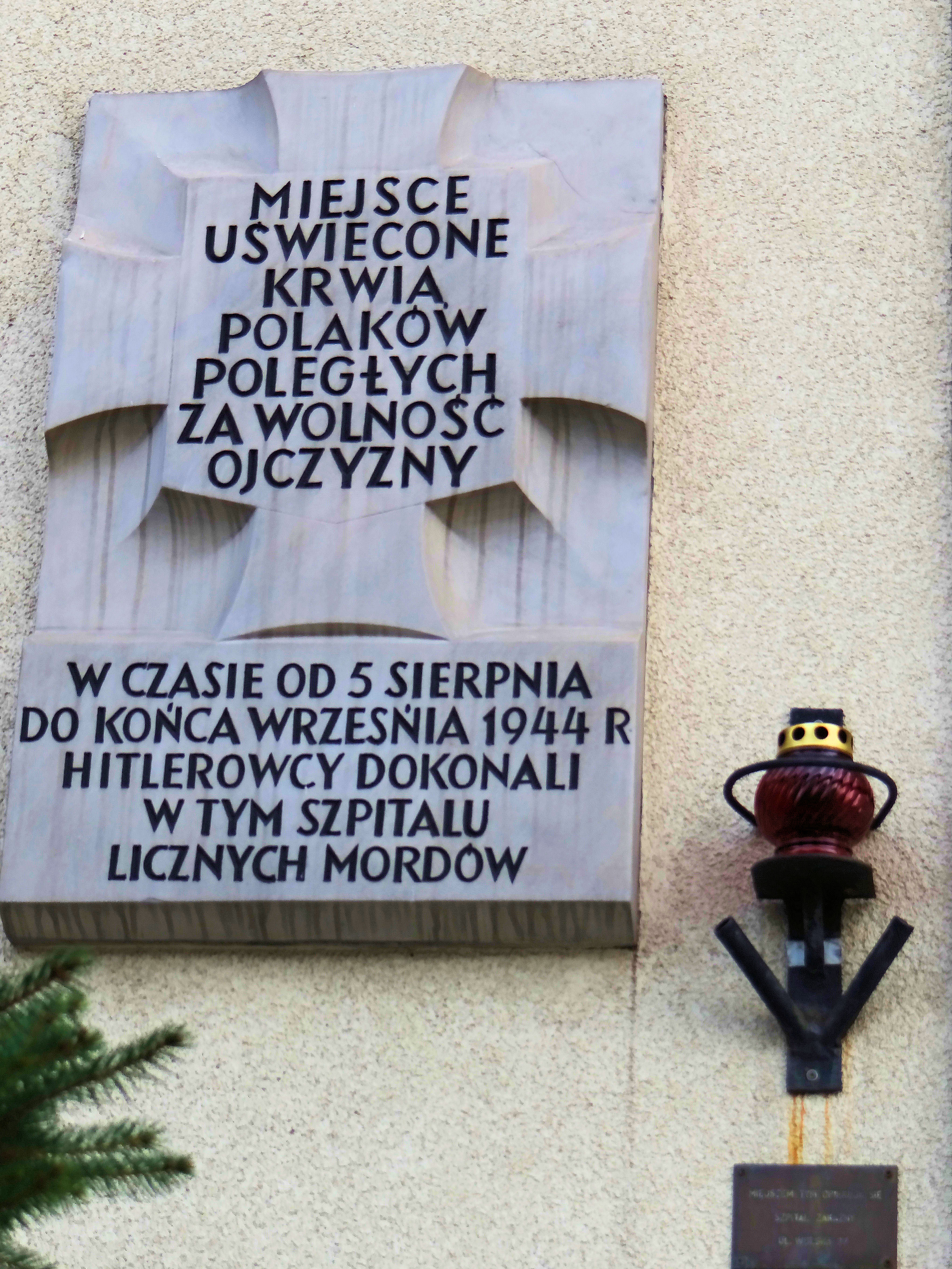
Tchorek plaque commemorating the victims of crimes committed by the Germans on the grounds of St. Stanislaus Hospital

The St. Stanislaus Infectious Diseases Hospital was located at 37 Wolska Street, the current site of the Provincial Infectious Diseases Hospital. During the German occupation, many hospital staff members were involved in various forms of underground activities. Just before the Warsaw Uprising, the sanitary services of the Home Army of the Wola District organized a rescue and sanitary point at the hospital. It was located in the pharmacy building, right at the entrance gate on Wolska Street. Dr. Joanna Kryńska, codenamed Elżbieta, commanded the point, overseeing about 15 young female paramedics, usually girls from Wola between 17 and 18 years old.

The twelfth ward was arranged with rooms for the wounded and an operating room. However, due to the lack of a surgical team and necessary equipment, seriously injured patients were typically sent to the Wola Hospital. The outbreak of the uprising prevented the hospital's director, Dr. Roman Ignacy Szpikowski, from reaching Wola. Consequently, Dr. Paweł Kubica from Zaolzie took over as acting director.

The first people assisted by the sanitary point's staff were civilians wounded near the tram depot on Młynarska Street when the uprising began. On the evening of August 1, due to the threat of shelling from Wolska Street, the sanitary point was moved from the pharmacy to the deeper hospital buildings. In the following days, the young female paramedics continuously assisted the wounded, even going to the front lines with stretchers. Severely wounded individuals were evacuated to the Wola Hospital whenever possible. Records show that between August 1 and 4, eight patients died from their injuries at St. Stanislaus Hospital. The first atrocity committed by German soldiers occurred on August 3 during the fighting along Wolska Street. They shot the head of the hospital pharmacy, Idzi Dziedziak, and from 5 to 6 men seeking refuge in the hospital lodge.

On "Black Saturday", August 5, between 2:00 and 3:00 PM, the hospital was taken over by SS men from the SS-Sonderregiment Dirlewanger. Upon entering the facility, they immediately shot the porter and then stormed into the buildings, looting, beating, and terrorizing patients. They expelled staff members, civilians hiding in the hospital, and lightly wounded and sick people into the hospital courtyard. At some point, several SS men indiscriminately opened fire on the crowd, killing up to a dozen people and wounding many others, including Dr. Jan Barcz. Subsequently, the Germans began preparing for a mass execution. They lined up the Poles in fours and led them to Wolska Street, where SS men shot at least a few people right outside the gate.

At this critical moment, Dr. Paweł Kubica saved the patients and staff. He ran to the SS officer in charge and loudly protested in perfect German: Man! This is a hospital! You are breaking Red Cross regulations! The bewildered SS officer halted the execution. Dr. Kubica's earlier decision not to allow insurgents to enter the hospital with weapons, which even rank-and-file SS men attested to, also worked in favor of the Poles at the hospital. Consequently, the officer decided to spare the staff and patients until the German command decided their fate.

In response to the imminent threat, a delegation was sent to the German command, led by Dr. Joanna Kryńska, who was fluent in German. She was accompanied by Dr. Mieczysław Rygalski and paramedic Anna Sławińska. German soldiers escorted them to the railway viaduct area over Wolska Street, where Dr. Leon Manteuffel and Dr. Stefan Wesołowski from the Wola Hospital were also brought. Upon seeing the Polish doctors, Dr. Heinz Hartlieb, the staff physician of Reinefarth's group, reprimanded the escort soldier, saying, Why did you bring them? We don’t need any Poles, and we just have to shoot them. Kryńska asserted that she had received the word of honor from a German officer that they would not be shot. Her appearance and fluent German made a strong impression on Hartlieb. After verifying her story at St. Stanislaus Hospital, Hartlieb announced that the execution order had been canceled thanks to his efforts. The order arrived just in time as German medics were preparing to execute the Polish doctors. (Note: The above description of the meeting between the Polish delegation and Dr. Hartlieb is based on testimony that Dr. Joanna Kryńska gave before the District Commission for the Investigation of German Crimes in Warsaw. On the other hand, the course of the talks was described somewhat differently in her memoirs by nurse Sławińska (2015, pp. 80–83).) Ultimately, Kryńska and her companions, along with Manteuffel and Wesołowski, were sent back to St. Stanislaus Hospital.

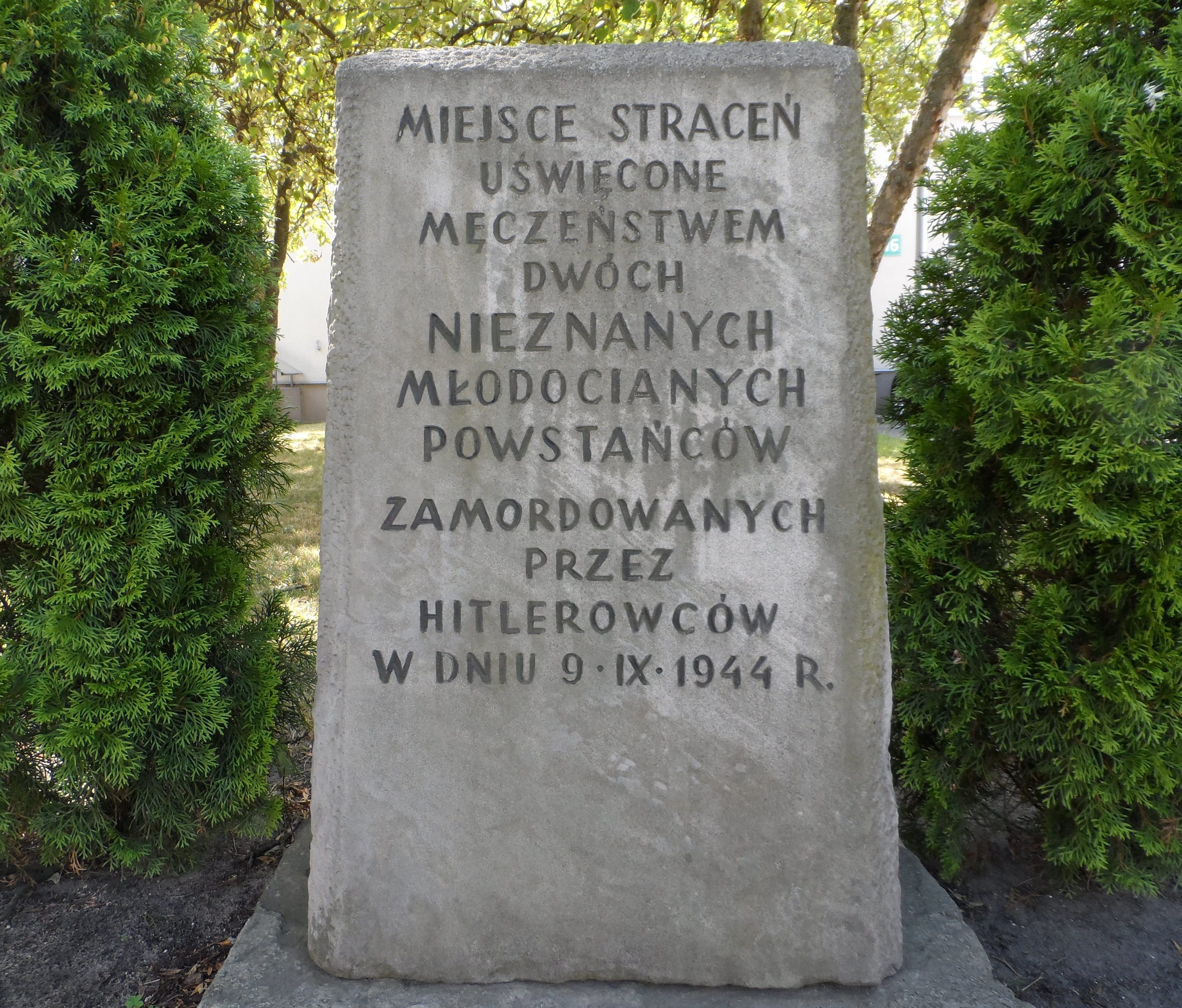
Memorial plaque on the hospital's courtyard commemorates two young insurgents hanged by the Dirlewanger Brigade

A German dressing point was set up at the hospital, where Polish surgeons brought from the Wola Hospital worked. Around 8 August, SS-Standartenführer Oskar Dirlewanger arrived and established his headquarters in the legally protected hospital building, with Dr. Kryńska serving as his translator. Despite escaping the mass killing on "Black Saturday", the hospital was not safe for patients and staff. Shortly after the Germans occupied the hospital, they hanged two young insurgents in the courtyard, (Note: Dr. Wesołowski (1974, p. 61) claimed that the two insurgents were hanged around August 6. Other sources point to August 9. A memorial plaque in the hospital courtyard, on the other hand, shows the incorrect date of September 9. Sławińska (2015, pp. 118–119) claimed that the hanged insurgents were closely related (they were supposed to be father and son or two brothers) (Utracka (2009, p. 74)).) mocking them by decorating their bodies with Polish national colors. On August 7, a patient was shot because his long boots were considered evidence that he was a hiding insurgent. One night, a German non-commissioned officer killed a prostitute being treated at the hospital "for hygienic reasons".

In the second half of August and throughout September, Gestapo officers from Sonderkommando Spilker, stationed at St. Wojciech's Church, conducted "selections" of severely ill patients and men at the hospital on Dirlewanger's orders. Those selected were taken to the church; some were sent to Pruszków, while others disappeared. During one of these "selections", Dr. Kubica and administrative manager Władysław Walczak risked their lives to pull several men, mostly doctors, including Dr. Manteuffel, out of the prisoner column (on August 13). All tuberculosis patients, including some healthy men hiding among them (possibly concealed insurgents), were taken to an unknown location. On September 25 or 26, nearly 100 patients and staff members were transported from the hospital to the Pruszków camp. Due to the intervention of an unnamed nurse at the Pruszków camp command, the staff members were spared deportation to Germany and were sent to Suchedniów instead.

Soon, wounded Poles who survived the executions during the Wola massacre began secretly arriving at the hospital. The Polish staff provided assistance as much as possible. On August 7, with Dr. Hartlieb's permission, a group of doctors and Daughters of Charity went out to search for the wounded on nearby streets. They managed to evacuate several injured people from one basement, but a group of 12 civilians hiding there was shot by a roaming Vlasovite. Realizing that eastern collaborators were ordered to kill hiding Poles, the doctors abandoned further expeditions to avoid endangering the refugees. In the second half of August, hospital workers secretly sheltered about a dozen Poles who had been hiding in the nearby Franaszek factory for a long time. To disguise the new "patients" from the Germans, they were given bandages or plaster casts.

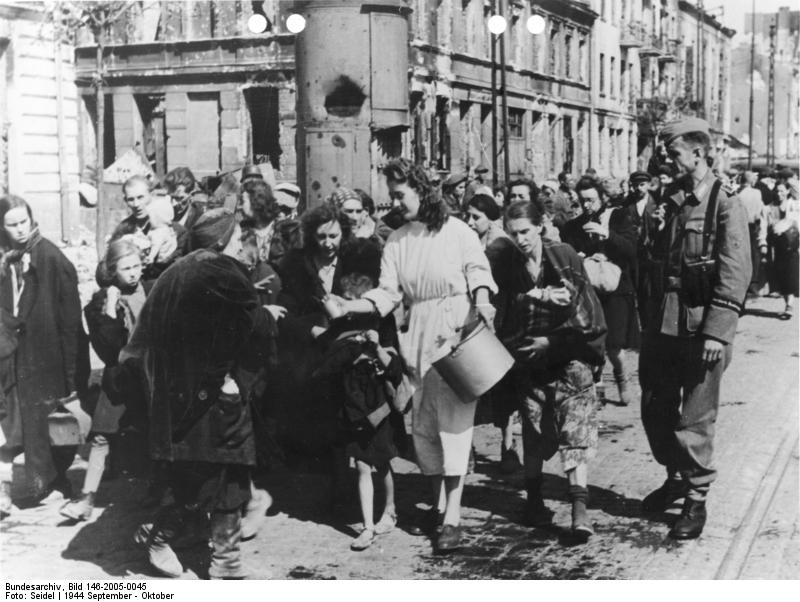
Polish nurses handing out water to refugees led down Wolska Street

The staff of St. Stanislaus Hospital extended their support to the displaced residents from other parts of Warsaw. Refugees driven through the streets of Wola were provided with water and coffee, and the medical staff offered first aid to the injured and sick, initially through simple bandaging. Patients in critical condition were admitted to the hospital where they received specialized care as much as possible. Administrative manager Władysław Walczak played a crucial role in this effort, leaving Warsaw several times a week in search of food and secretly transporting from 2 to 3 lightly wounded or convalescent individuals out of the hospital each time. This clandestine operation helped many refugees avoid deportation to the Pruszków transit camp. Records indicate that between August 17 and October 3, the hospital recorded 52 patient deaths.

The relief efforts were conducted under extremely challenging conditions. The constant influx of wounded soon led to a shortage of beds and linens. The hospital also faced persistent shortages of medicines, dressings, and even water. The lack of a fully equipped surgical department and necessary surgical equipment further complicated the provision of care to severely injured patients. After Dr. Manteuffel left Warsaw on August 25, Dr. Stefan Wesołowski remained the sole surgeon until the end of the uprising. The arrival of a few doctors and nurses from other hospitals captured by the Germans partially alleviated the staffing crisis. (Note: These included dermatologist Dr. Piotr Zalewski and nurses Maria Łaniewska and Wanda Tomaszewska (survivors of the massacre at the St. Lazarus Hospital), as well as a group of physicians from hospitals on Krakowskie Przedmieście, including internist Dr. Edward Górka, ophthalmologist Dr. Jerzy Morawiecki and gynecologist Dr. Roman Borkowski (Gursztyn (2014, p. 312)).) On August 11, contact was established with the Wola Hospital, allowing Dr. Wesołowski to consult with surgeons there. Efforts to compensate for the shortage of medicines, dressings, and hospital equipment included searching abandoned hospitals in Wola and other districts of Warsaw.

Dr. Stefan Wesołowski left the city on October 19. By the end of October, St. Stanislaus Hospital ceased operations (some sources indicate this occurred on November 1). Critically ill patients were transferred to Kraków, while pediatric patients were sent to Milanówek. Sixty patients, along with staff, equipment, and supplies of linens and food, were evacuated to Radziwiłłów. A few days later, they were moved to nearby Studzieniec, where the hospital resumed operations in the abandoned buildings of the Juvenile Detention Center. Meanwhile, the building on Wolska Street was turned into a storage facility for ammunition and explosives by the Germans. An explosion led to the partial collapse of the building, with further damage caused by the thorough looting of mechanical devices and equipment by the Germans. In April 1945, the hospital staff relocated from Studzieniec to the hospital on Siennicka Street in Praga, and in July 1948, they finally returned to the rebuilt building on Wolska Street.

== St. Lazarus Hospital ==
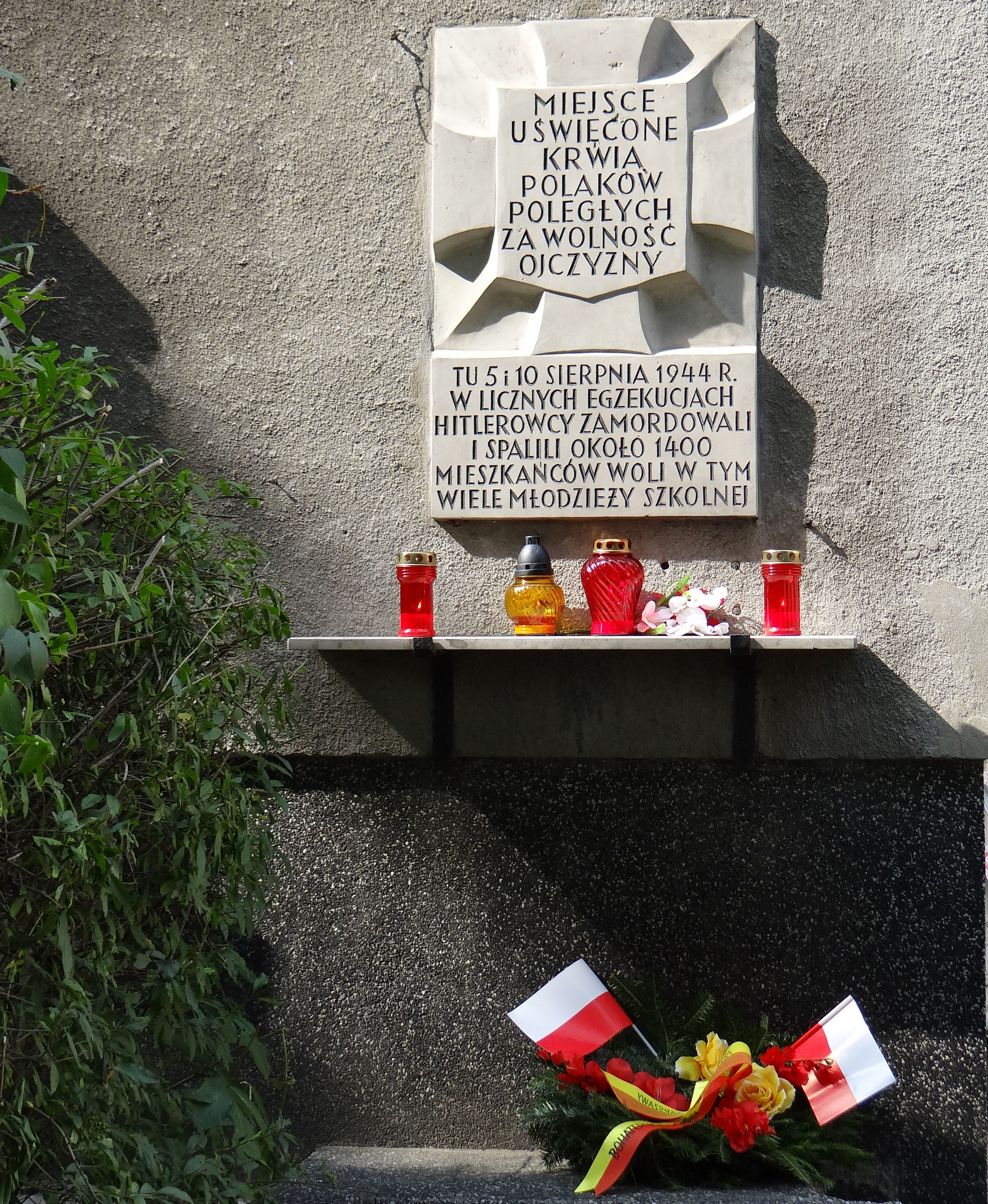
Tchorek plaque on the wall of the building at 53 Karolkowa Street, commemorating the victims of the St. Lazarus Hospital massacre

Before World War II and in the initial years of the German occupation, St. Lazarus Hospital was located at 2 Książęca Street in Warsaw's Powiśle district. In 1941, German authorities seized the hospital building, prompting a relocation to a complex at the intersection of Leszno and Karolkowa streets. This new location had previously been occupied by the Main Shelter for Jewish Orphans and the Elderly.

Following the outbreak of the Warsaw Uprising, St. Lazarus Hospital became a refuge for injured insurgents and civilians. It also served as a rest and nourishment point for healthy soldiers. Around August 3, the sanitary services of the Home Army’s Wola District reinforced the hospital staff with a sanitary patrol, including a nurse and fourteen girl scouts aged 15 to 18 from the Emilia Plater Troop. Witnesses testified that Home Army soldiers respected the hospital’s neutral status, refraining from military activities under its cover, although conflicting accounts exist.

On 5 August 1944, the day the German assault on Wola began, the hospital housed approximately 300 patients, 300 wounded individuals, and dozens of staff members. Additionally, hundreds of Wola residents, mostly relatives of patients and staff or nearby residents, sought shelter there, hoping the hospital’s protected status under the laws of war would guarantee their safety. Around 1,500 Poles were present in the hospital.

On August 5, in the afternoon, fierce fighting erupted near the hospital. Around 4:00 PM, German soldiers stormed Building A on Wolska Street, home to the women's internal medicine and men's venereal disease departments. Upon entering, the soldiers immediately killed a nurse from Greater Poland who attempted to negotiate in German. A Polish Blue Policeman from Białystok made a similar attempt but was seriously wounded. The Germans then damaged the gas installation, but the Air Raid Defense Commander managed to turn off the gas before it endangered the occupants. Some individuals escaped the building while the soldiers were temporarily away, but the Germans soon blocked further escape by setting up a machine gun on Karolkowa Street. Another group of soldiers entered, robbed the occupants of valuables, and commenced a massacre using grenades and machine guns, sparing neither children, women, nor the severely wounded.

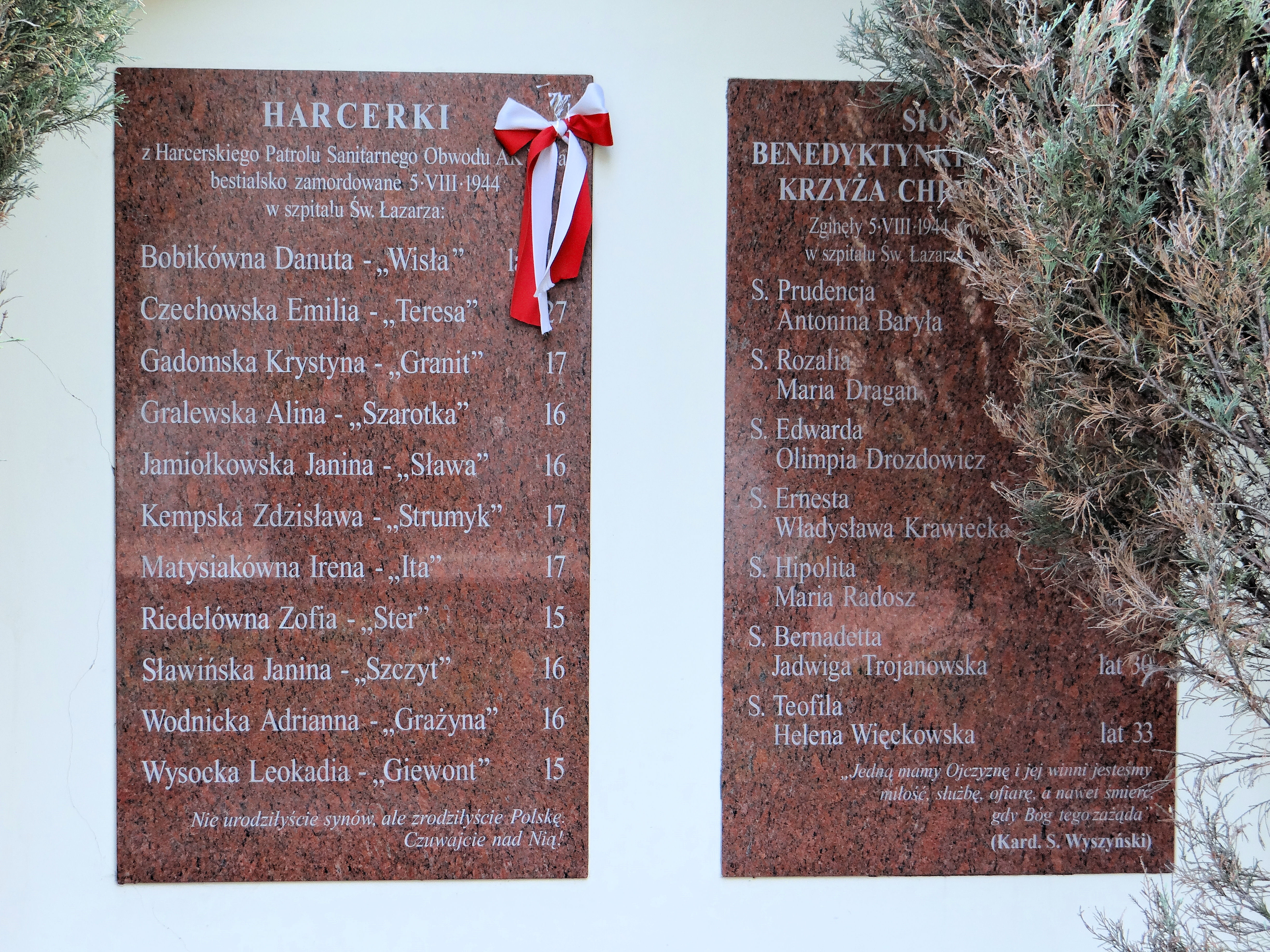
Plaques commemorating Girl Scouts and Benedictine Sisters murdered at St. Lazarus Hospital. Warsaw Wola Martyrs' Square

By 6:00 PM, the Germans had captured the pavilion on Karolkowa Street, and by 8:00 PM, they controlled the pavilion on Leszno Street. They executed all captured Poles regardless of age or gender, shooting severely wounded patients in their beds or on stretchers. Survivors capable of walking were herded into the hospital basement and methodically shot in the back of the head. Those from the Karolkowa pavilion were executed in the hospital courtyard. Among those killed at the hands of the Germans were a group of doctors, nurses and nuns. This massacre, accompanied by rapes and looting, continued late into the night, culminating around 11:00 PM when the Germans set the hospital on fire, burning many victims alive. Witnesses reported patients jumping from windows to escape the flames.

The massacre at St. Lazarus Hospital resulted in approximately 1,200 deaths, including around 50 staff members, among them at least seven Benedictine nuns. Eleven nurses from the Home Army’s Wola District sanitary patrol, including ten teenage girl scouts, were also killed. Among the murdered patients were about 40 wounded Home Army soldiers. The pharmacist Ignacy Giedroyc – father of Jerzy Giedroyc, editor of the Kultura magazine – was also killed. The murdered patients, in turn, included about 40 wounded Home Army soldiers. Lech Matawowski, codenamed Mirek, commander of the 1st Company in the People's Army’s Fourth Battalion, may have also perished. (Note: The exact date and circumstances of Matawowski's death are unknown. According to some sources, he may have been murdered on August 6 at the Koral and Maria Hospital (Gursztyn (2014, p. 312)).)

Only a few Poles survived the massacre. A small group of wounded was evacuated to the nearby Karol and Maria Hospital before the Germans arrived. On the night between August 5 and 6, two nurses returned to St. Lazarus searching for survivors; one narrowly escaped German capture, while the other vanished. Some doctors and nurses were spared and directed to work at St. Stanislaus Infectious Diseases Hospital. (Note: Urbanek (1988, p. 179) and Sławińska (2015, p. 92) reported that the Germans spared about 50 members of the staff (including 17 nuns). They were supposed to have survived thanks to the intervention of German soldiers, who had previously been treated at the St. Lazarus Hospital.) A few managed to survive the execution and later testified before the District Commission for the Investigation of German Crimes in Warsaw.

In the following days, St. Lazarus Hospital’s grounds were used for another mass execution. Testimony from surviving members of the Verbrennungskommando Warschau shows that on August 13, about 50 men brought from the Ministry of Treasury building on Bank Square were shot near the hospital pharmacy.

The original hospital building on Książęca Street was entirely destroyed during the Warsaw Uprising. In 1948, the hospital resumed operations in the rebuilt building on Leszno Street. In 1963, it was renamed the Metropolitan Dermatological Hospital. Following the restitution of the building to the Jewish Religious Community, the hospital relocated in 2007 to the right bank of the Vistula river, becoming part of the Międzylesie Specialist Hospital. The building on 15 Leszno Street was subsequently demolished, and the site was sold for residential and commercial development.

== Karol and Maria Children's Hospital ==
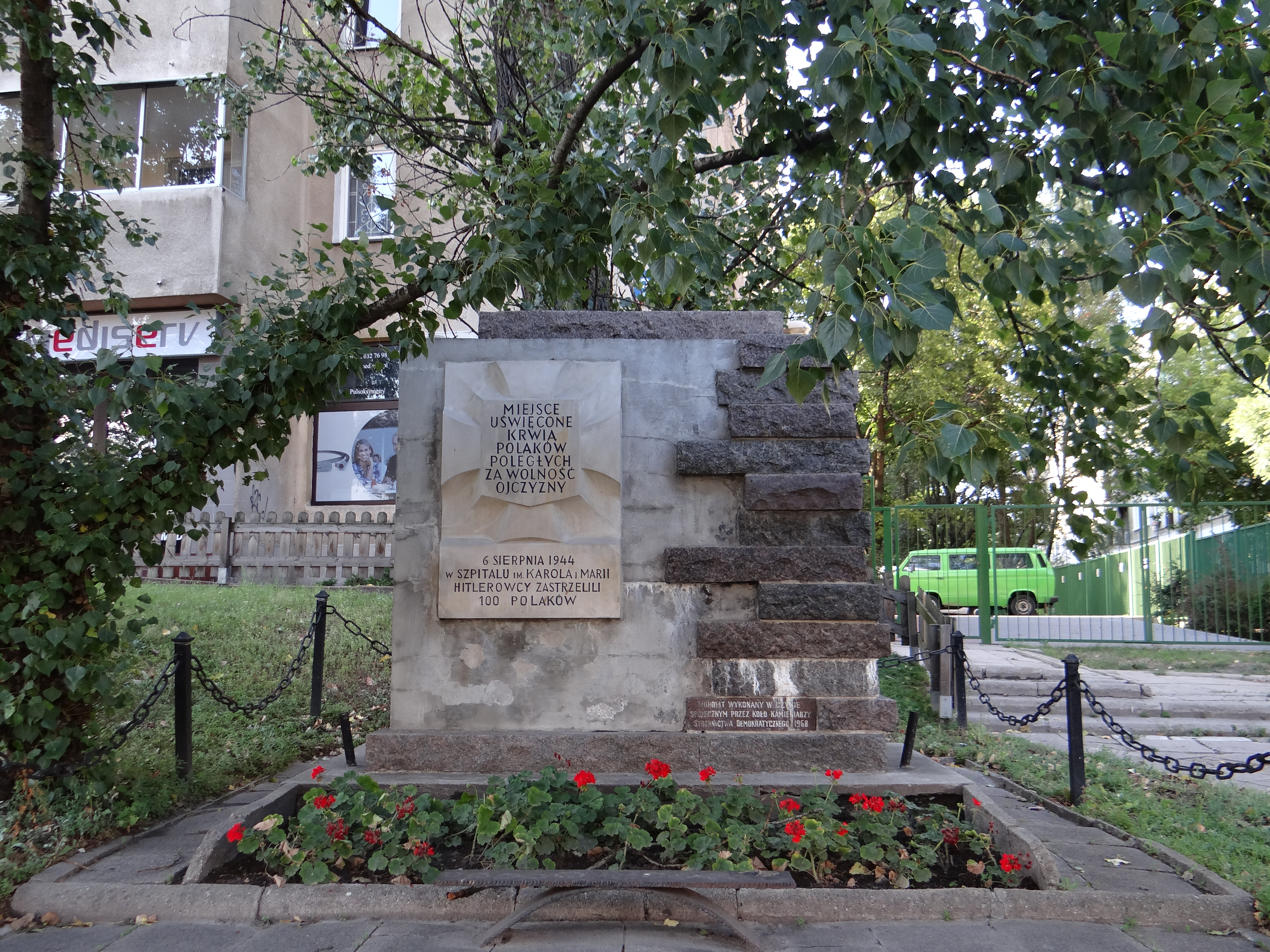
Tchorek plaque at 30 Leszno Street, commemorating the victims of the massacre at the Karol and Maria Hospital

The Karol and Maria Children's Hospital was situated in a complex of nine pavilions occupying the block bordered by Leszno, Młynarska, Karolkowa, and Żytnia streets (address: 136 Leszno Street). The facility had 150 children's beds. In the plans for the Warsaw Uprising, the hospital was designated as the main dressing station for the Parasol Battalion. (Note: Just before the outbreak of the uprising, a weapons storage facility for the Parasol Battalion was also organized in the Karol and Maria Hospital (Wiśniewska & Sikorska (1991, p. 19)).) However, after the "W" hour (the start of the uprising), the Wola Hospital fell directly into the combat zone, necessitating the Karol and Maria Hospital to assume the role of the central medical point in Wola. As a result, wounded insurgents and civilians continuously arrived, as well as a few captured German soldiers, and the patient count quickly exceeded the hospital's capacity. Some of the injured had to be transported to the nearby St. Lazarus Hospital.

Due to the lack of adequate surgical staff, Dr. Włodzimierz Kmicikiewicz from Wola Hospital was assigned to the Karol and Maria Hospital. The Headquarters of the Sanitary Division of Kedyw (Home Army's Directorate of Sabotage and Diversion) also set up in the hospital, with over fifty Home Army nurses bolstering the local staff. In the early days of the uprising, the hospital evacuated child patients who could be cared for by their families. About 60 children, either from outside Warsaw or too ill to leave, were moved to the most secluded pavilion, S.

Intense fighting on "Black Saturday" placed the hospital near the front lines. At midnight on August 6, the command of the Radosław Group informed the hospital's management that the insurgent forces would not be able to hold the hospital, ordering the evacuation of the wounded and staff. However, the order came too late and lacked clear instructions on the evacuation destination. Consequently, only the Kedyw Sanitary Division and a small number of lightly wounded patients left the hospital. Approximately 150 wounded and 60 sick children remained in the pavilions. The director allowed the staff to decide whether to stay or evacuate with the insurgent units. Although some staff members left that night, the majority chose to stay with the patients. A group of nurses from various Home Army units also decided to stay. To protect the wounded soldiers, nurses burned hospital records and documents, confiscated weapons, white-and-red armbands, eagles, and other military insignia from the wounded.

On the morning of August 6, around 7:00 AM, three German soldiers entered the hospital. They conversed with a doctor, threatening that if any weapons were found on the hospital grounds, all Poles would be executed, and the building would be burned. German prisoners treated at the hospital assured the SS officers they had been well cared for. After the Germans left, the staff removed several grenades hidden by wounded insurgents from the building. Meanwhile, fierce fighting continued in the hospital's vicinity.

Between 3:00 and 4:00 PM, SS men, accompanied by soldiers from one of the Azerbaijani collaborationist battalions, entered the hospital. The attackers immediately began looting and raping women. The staff and patients who could move on their own were driven out of the hospital, while the severely ill and injured – about thirty-five in total – were murdered (one patient was shot in the operating room). Shortly afterward, the hospital was set on fire. In front of the building, the Germans conducted a "selection", during which those identified as wounded insurgents were pulled from the crowd and shot. About 40 wounded, along with a group of doctors and nurses, were marched through the burning streets of Leszno and Górczewska. Along the way, the Germans stopped some of the wounded, took them back to the hospital, and executed them. A moment later, at the intersection with Młynarska Street, the procession was stopped again. A German officer then asked the Polish doctors about the hospital commander. When they truthfully replied that the director was not among them, the German threatened that all the doctors would be shot if the commander did not come forward within a minute. Hearing this, the chief surgeon of the hospital, Dr. Włodzimierz Kmicikiewicz, stepped out of the line. On the officer's order, one of the Azerbaijani collaborators killed him with a shot to the head.

Initially, the Germans intended to lead the column to the area of Górczewska and Moczydło streets and execute them there. However, before this could happen, the execution order was canceled. The group of Poles likely owed their survival to a previously treated wounded German soldier from the Karol and Maria Hospital. With loud shouts, he stopped a passing officer (probably a doctor), who then ordered the escort to take the Poles to the Wola Hospital. (Note: Some sources say that some personnel were also escorted to Fort Bema. There, the Germans were later to release those who had reached the age of 60, as well as the hospital's employees, headed by Józefa Jurkowska, the supervisor of nurses (the latter were to be sent to a branch of the Wola Hospital in Jelonki) (Urbanek (1988, p. 184); Mórawski, Oktabiński & Świerczek (2000, pp. 140–141)).) However, before the hospital staff could settle all the newcomers, the Germans issued new orders. They were instructed to leave only the child patients at Płocka Street and send the adult wounded back to the Karol and Maria Hospital. Despite SS supervision, the Polish staff managed to hide some of the wounded. The patients who were returned to Leszno Street were murdered.

Meanwhile, about 20 children remained in the burning Karol and Maria Hospital, along with the facility's director, Dr. Jan Bogdanowicz, Dr. Irena Gacówna, and seven nurses, defying German orders. On the morning of August 7, German soldiers encountered them and sent the doctors, six nurses, and a group of children to the Wola Hospital. However, nurse Wanda Dąbrowska stayed in the garden of the Karol and Maria Hospital with several children and infants. Trying to keep the children alive, she fed them juice from green tomatoes. After some time, Germans found Dąbrowska and ordered her to go to the Wola Hospital. It was only after a few days, when a soldier brought an infant found in the garden to Płocka Street, that the Germans allowed the Polish staff to retrieve the remaining children. However, only one live infant was found in the hospital garden. Despite careful care, both found children died at the Wola Hospital.

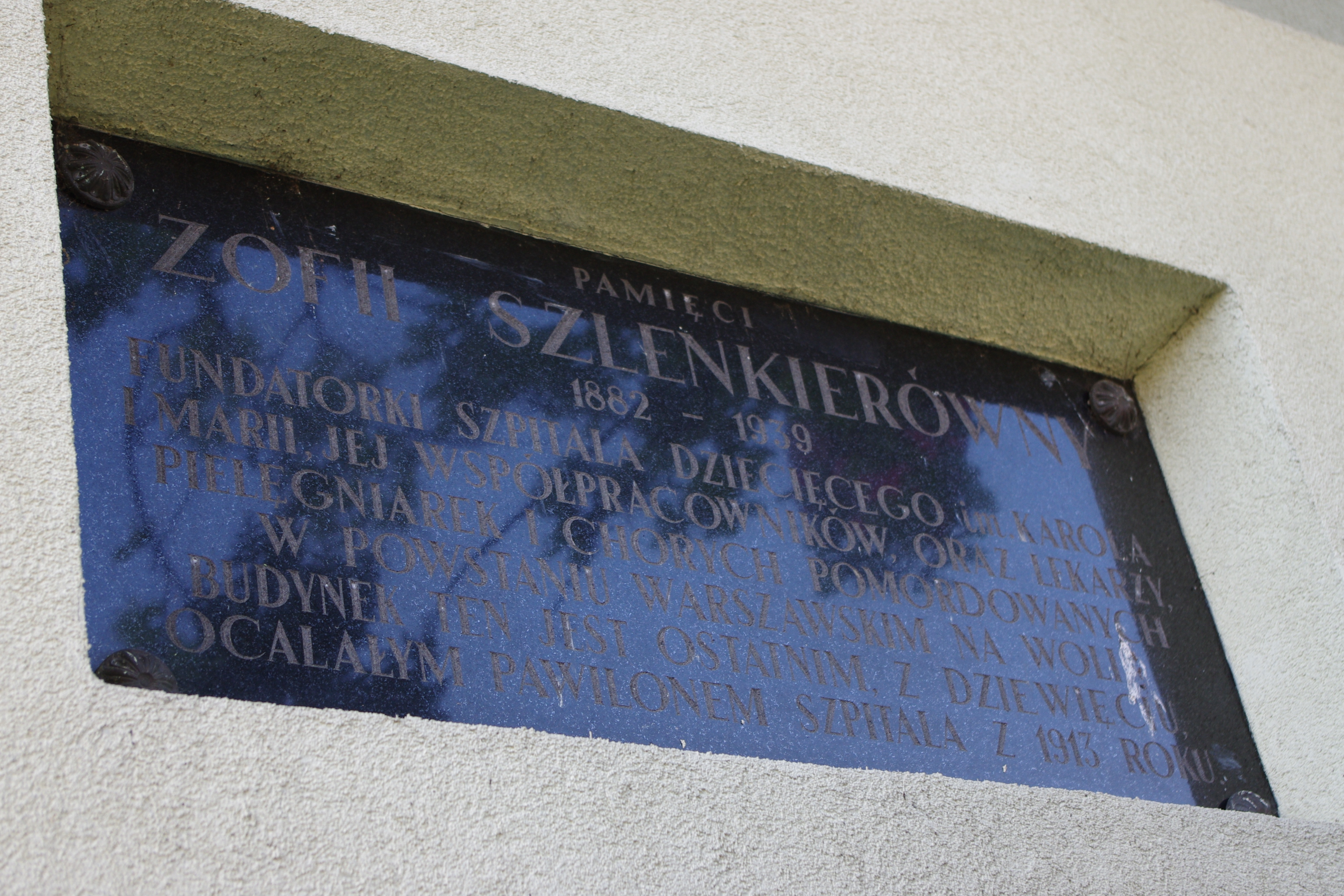
Plaque at 39 Żytnia Street commemorating Zofia Szlenkier and the victims of the massacre at the Karol and Maria Hospital

The liquidation of the Karol and Maria Hospital resulted in 100 to 200 deaths. Among the staff, Dr. Włodzimierz Kmicikiewicz, nurses Michalina Stobierska and Janina Sidorowska, and hospital worker Stanisław Stępień were killed. Among the murdered patients were, among others, Captain Aleksander Lossow-Niemojowski (National Military Organization activist, chief of staff of the Paweł Group), Platoon-leader Jerzy Flanc, codenamed Grab (soldier of the Zośka Battalion), Officer Cadet Stanisław Dąbrowski codenamed Cyklon (soldier of the Parasol Battalion), Second Lieutenant Antoni Wojciechowski, codenamed Antek and Second Lieutenant Janusz Zalewski, codenamed Supełek (soldiers of the Warsaw District's Kedyw Dispositional Unit A), as well as Jan Władymirski (fighter from the Czwartak Battalion).

The surviving doctors, students, and nurses from the Karol and Maria Hospital reinforced the Wola Hospital staff and shared its insurgent fate. On 20 October 1944, eight days before the final evacuation of the Wola Hospital, the staff of the Karol and Maria Hospital was transported by freight train to Włodzimierzów near Piotrków Trybunalski. In a nearby forest building, the hospital staff organized a medical facility that operated until 20 October 1945. After its liquidation, the Karol and Maria Hospital staff returned to the capital and began working at the Mother and Child Home at 13 Przybyszewskiego Street in Bielany. The hospital complex at Leszno Street was never rebuilt. In 1947, the Karol and Maria Hospital resumed operations in a building on Działdowska Street, equipped by the Swiss social organization Don Suisse. Three years later, its name was changed to State Clinical Hospital No. 3.

== Commemoration ==
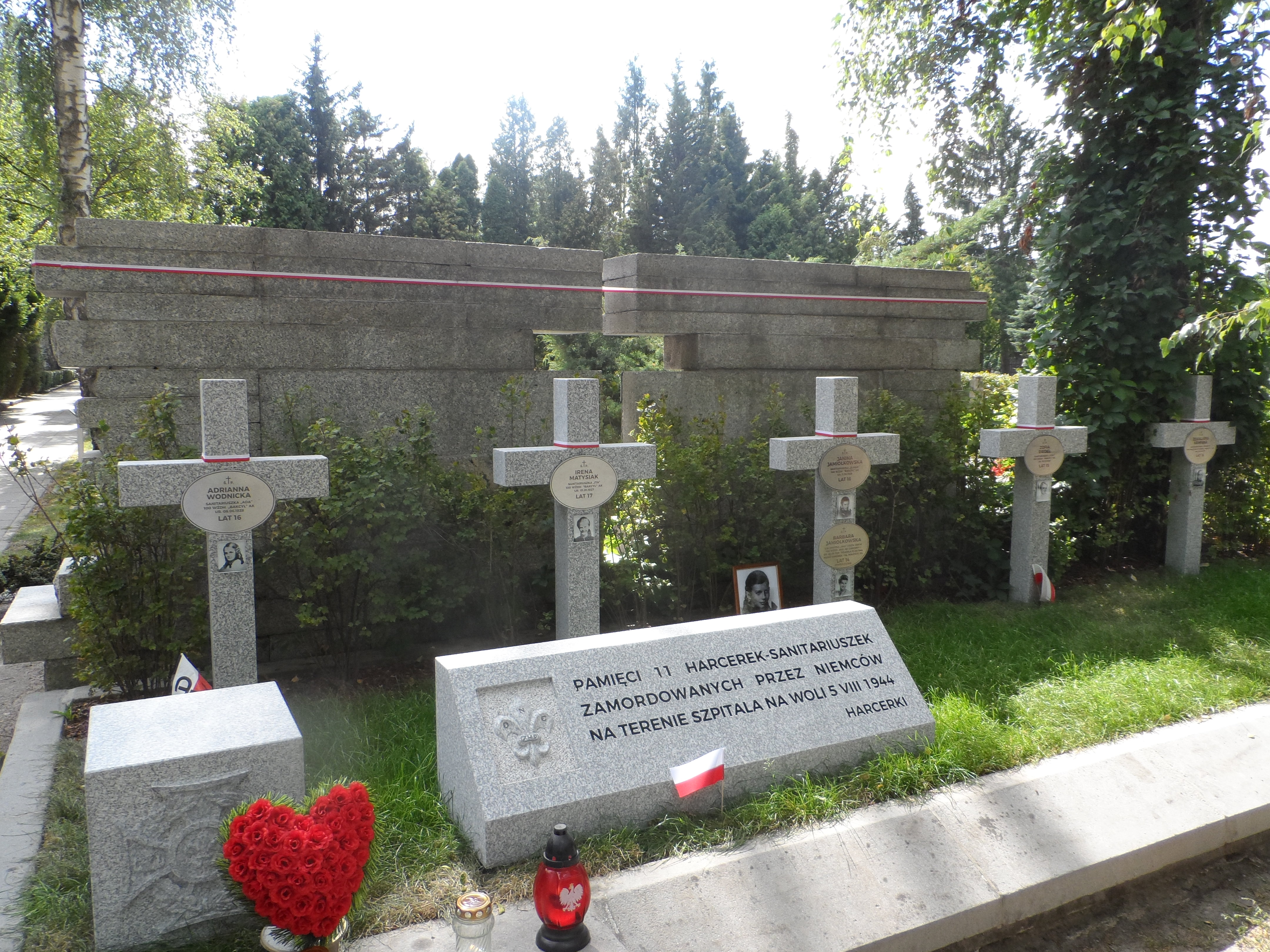
Graves of the nurses of the Emilia Plater scout team murdered in St. Lazarus Hospital. Powązki Military Cemetery

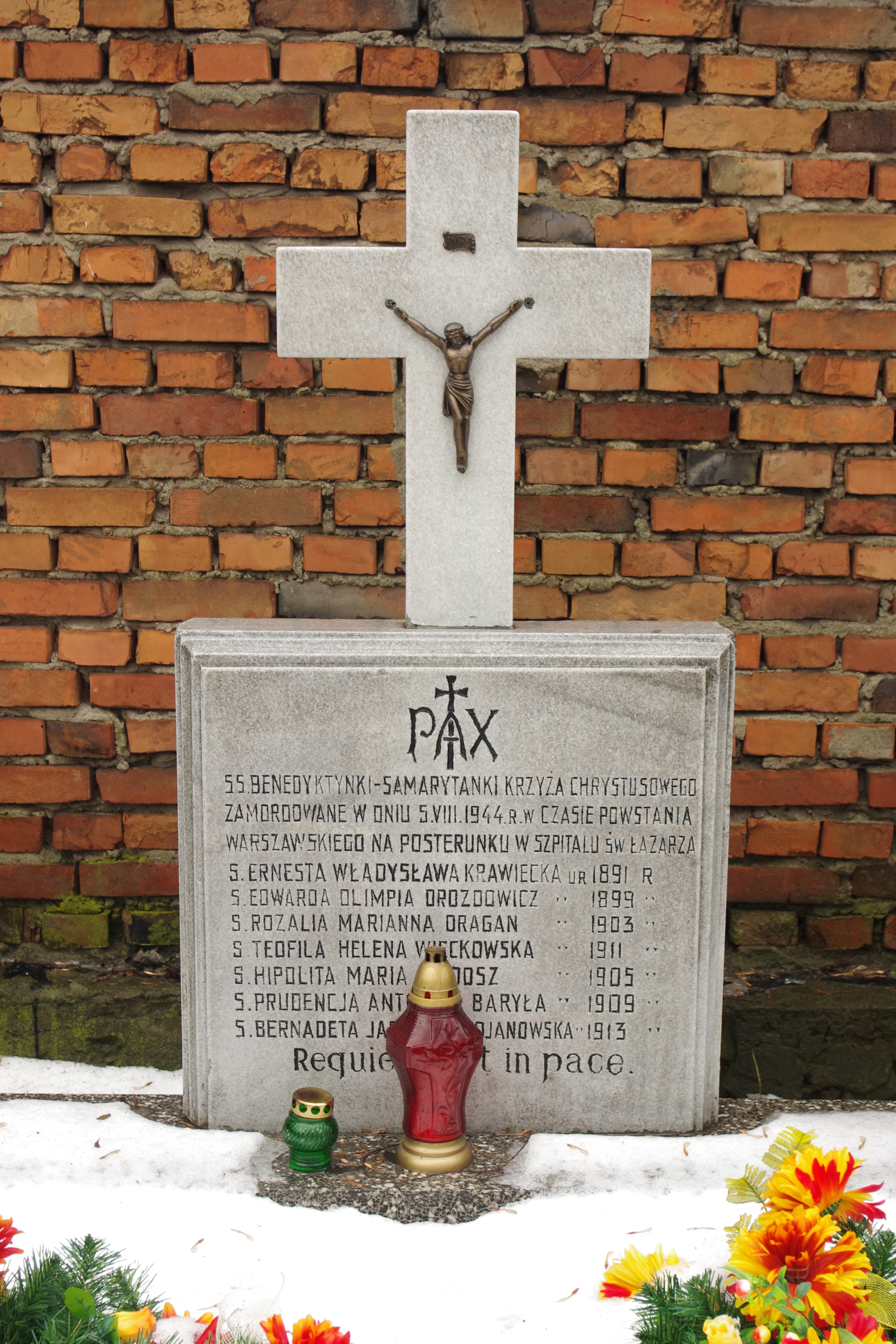
Grave of the Benedictine nuns murdered in St. Lazarus Hospital. Wola Cemetery

The first ceremony commemorating the victims of the liquidation of the Wola Hospital took place on 5 August 1945, on the first anniversary of the Wola massacre. On that day, a procession led by three survivors of the hospital massacre – doctors Stefan Wesołowski and Leon Manteuffel and student Jan Napiórkowski – departed from the hospital at Płocka Street. They carried a wooden cross, which was planted at the execution site on Górczewska Street (near the railway viaduct). The funeral service was conducted by Father Bernard Filipiuk and Father Marian Chwilczyński – both survivors of the executions carried out at that site. Annually, on August 5, a mass is held in the chapel of the Institute of Tuberculosis and Lung Diseases in memory of the murdered. Afterward, a roll call of the fallen takes place, followed by a procession to the memorial site on Górczewska Street.

By a resolution of the Presidium of the State National Council on 31 July 1946 and at the request of the Wola Hospital Staff Council in Warsaw, employees of the Wola Hospital who were shot by the Nazis on the hospital grounds on 5 August 1944 were posthumously awarded the Silver Medal for Merit on the Field of Glory.

The crimes committed by the Germans in the Wola hospitals are commemorated in the following places:

- 32 Górczewska Street (at the intersection with Prymasa Tysiąclecia Avenue) – an eight-meter steel cross and several plaques commemorate the thousands of victims murdered in this area during the Wola massacre, including 360 patients and staff of the Wola Hospital;
- 49 Karolkowa Street – a small enclosed square adjacent to the church and monastery of the Redemptorists has been known since 2000 as the Square of the Martyrs of Warsaw Wola. There are several commemorative plaques dedicated to the residents of the district murdered in August 1944. Three plaques respectively commemorate the murdered Wola Hospital staff, the girl scouts from the Home Army's Wola District's sanitary patrol and the Benedictine sisters murdered in the St. Lazarus Hospital;
- 56 Karolkowa Street – a plaque designed by Karol Tchorek, installed on the wall of Special School Complex No. 101, commemorates the victims of the massacre at St. Lazarus Hospital (until 2015, this plaque was located on the wall of a house at 53 Karolkowa Street). In 1993, a granite slab dedicated to the murdered girl scouts from the Home Army's Wola District's sanitary patrol was additionally unveiled near the adjacent sidewalk; (Note: The ceremony was attended by relatives of the Girl Scouts, their friends from the Grey Ranks, and two surviving members of the Emilia Plater troop – Wanda Łokietek-Borzęcka and Wanda Jaskłowska (Gursztyn (2014, p. 375)).)
- 30 Leszno Street – a plaque designed by Karol Tchorek, installed in 1968 on a reconstructed section of the wall, commemorates the victims of the massacre at the Karol and Maria Hospital;
- 26 Płocka Street – a small monument and two commemorative stones, unveiled in 1989 in front of the building of the Institute of Tuberculosis and Lung Diseases, commemorate the patients and staff of the Wola Hospital murdered on 5 August 1944. The victims of the massacre are also commemorated by a plaque inside the building;
- 37 Wolska Street – a plaque designed by Karol Tchorek, embedded in the front wall of the building, commemorates the victims of murders committed by the Germans on the grounds of the St. Stanislaus Infectious Disease Hospital. In the hospital courtyard, there is another commemorative plaque dedicated to two young insurgents hanged by the Germans shortly after the hospital's capture (the plaque gives the incorrect date of September 9);
- 39 Żytnia Street – a plaque on the front wall of the building, embedded in 1989, commemorates Zofia Szlenkier, the founder of the Karol and Maria Hospital, as well as the hospital's patients and staff murdered during the Warsaw Uprising.

For years, the building of the Capital Dermatological Hospital at 15 Leszno Street (demolished in 2009) housed a plaque dedicated to the staff of St. Lazarus Hospital who fell and were murdered during World War II, including during the Warsaw Uprising.

In the insurgent quarter of the Powązki Military Cemetery, there are graves of eleven girl scouts from the Home Army's Wola District's sanitary patrol murdered in the St. Lazarus Hospital. The graves of the Benedictine sisters murdered in this hospital are located in the Wola Cemetery.

== Bibliography ==
- Ciepłowski, Stanisław (2004). Wpisane w kamień i spiż. Inskrypcje pamiątkowe w Warszawie XVIII–XX w (in Polish). Warsaw: Argraf. ISBN 83-912463-4-5.
- Datner, Szymon (1962). Leszczyński, Kazimierz (ed.). Zbrodnie okupanta w czasie powstania warszawskiego w 1944 roku (w dokumentach) (in Polish). Warsaw: MON.
- Geber, Halina (2004). Halweg, Halina (ed.). Szpital Dobrej Woli. Szpital Wolski 1939–1945 (in Polish). Warsaw: Czytelnik. ISBN 83-07-02980-5.
- Gursztyn, Piotr (2014). Rzeź Woli. Zbrodnia nierozliczona (in Polish). Warsaw: DEMART SA. ISBN 978-83-7427-869-0.
- Kopf, Stanisław (2004). Powstańcze służby sanitarne (in Polish). Warsaw: Warszawa Walczy 1939–1945. ISBN 83-11-09806-9.
- Motyl, Maja; Rutkowski, Stanisław (1994). Powstanie Warszawskie – rejestr miejsc i faktów zbrodni (in Polish). Warsaw: GKBZpNP-IPN.
- Mórawski, Karol; Oktabiński, Krzysztof; Świerczek, Lidia (2000). Wola. Warszawskie Termopile 1944 (in Polish). Warsaw: Wystawa Warszawa Walczy 1939–1945. ISBN 83-87545-26-0.
- Serwański, Edward (1946). Trawińska, Irena (ed.). Zbrodnia niemiecka w Warszawie 1944 r (in Polish). Poznań: Wydawnictwo Instytutu Zachodniego.
- Sławińska, Anna Danuta (2015). Przeżyłam to. Wola 1944 (in Polish). Gondwana. ISBN 978-83-63756-08-6.
- Sumiński, Tadeusz, ed. (1957). Pamiętniki żołnierzy baonu "Zośka". Powstanie Warszawskie (in Polish). Warsaw: Nasza Księgarnia.
- Urbanek, Bożena (1988). Pielęgniarki i sanitariuszki w Powstaniu Warszawskim w 1944 r (in Polish). Warsaw: Państwowe Wydawnictwo Naukowe. ISBN 83-01-06803-5.
- Utracka, Katarzyna (2009). Powstańcze miejsca pamięci. Wola 1944 (in Polish). Warsaw: Urząd Dzielnicy Wola m.st. Warszawy. ISBN 978-83-911262-3-3.
- Wesołowski, Stefan (1974). "Chirurg i wojna". Pamiętniki chirurgów (in Polish). Warsaw: Czytelnik.
- Wiśniewska, Maria; Sikorska, Małgorzata (1991). Szpitale powstańczej Warszawy (in Polish). Warsaw: Rytm. ISBN 83-85249-04-4.
- Woźniewski, Zbigniew (1974). Książka raportów lekarza dyżurnego. Szpital Wolski w okresie Powstania Warszawskiego (in Polish). Warsaw: Państwowy Instytut Wydawniczy.
- Exodus Warszawy. Ludzie i miasto po Powstaniu 1944. Pamiętniki. Relacje (in Polish). Vol. I. Warsaw: Państwowy Instytut Wydawniczy. 1992. ISBN 83-06-01589-4.
- Ludność cywilna w powstaniu warszawskim. Pamiętniki, relacje, zeznania (in Polish). Vol. I. Warsaw: Państwowy Instytut Wydawniczy. 1974.
