= Barbara Warda =

Polish nurse and physician

- Born: May 24, 1912; Warsaw
- Died: February 27, 1999 (aged 86); Warsaw
- Burial place: Northern Communal Cemetery in Warsaw
- Other names: Stara, Barbara Wardzianka
- Citizenship: Polish
- Education: Warsaw School of Nursing, University of Warsaw
- Occupations: nurse, doctor, conspirator
- Honours: Order of Polonia Restituta, Medal For Participation in the Defensive War of 1939, Warsaw Uprising Cross, Cross of Merit, Cross of the Home Army, Medal of the 10th Anniversary of People's Poland, Honorary Badge of the Polish Tourist and Sightseeing Society, Honorary Badge For Merits to Warsaw

Barbara Warda, also known as Barbara Wardzianka, codenamed Stara (born 24 May 1912 in Warsaw, died 27 February 1999 in Warsaw), was a Polish nurse and physician. For most of her professional career, she was associated with the Wola Hospital in Warsaw. Warda served as a soldier in the Home Army and participated in the Warsaw Uprising.

== Biography ==
=== Youth and education ===
Barbara Warda was born on 24 May 1912 in Warsaw, to Wincenty Warda and Malwina Mackiewicz. During her childhood and adolescence, she lived with her parents in Kutno. In 1931, she graduated from the Tadeusz Kościuszko Gymnasium in Gostynin.

From 1936, she studied at the Warsaw School of Nursing, earning her diploma in 1939. She planned to work in Zakopane, where her family lived after finishing her studies. However, in the spring of 1939, Dr. Józef Marian Piasecki, the director of Wola Hospital, requested the school to recommend two of the best graduates from the class of 1939 for employment at his facility. Barbara Warda was one of those recommended. She started working at Wola Hospital on 1 April 1939 as a scrub nurse and head of the operating room.

=== Underground activities ===
In September 1939, she remained in besieged Warsaw. Along with other staff members from Wola Hospital, she provided assistance to injured soldiers and civilian victims of German air raids and artillery fire.

During the occupation, she became involved in underground activities within the sanitary services of the Home Army. She adopted the codename Stara. She trained medics in secret courses organized at Wola Hospital. She participated in the operation to free Stanisław Miedza-Tomaszewski, who was transferred from Pawiak prison to Wola Hospital, where his death was faked during a supposed operation. In February 1944, when heavily wounded Bronisław Pietraszewicz, codenamed Lot, the commander of Operation Kutschera, was brought to Wola Hospital, she was one of the medical staff involved in the unsuccessful attempt to save his life.

In 1943, she began her medical studies at the underground University of the Western Lands.

=== Warsaw Uprising ===
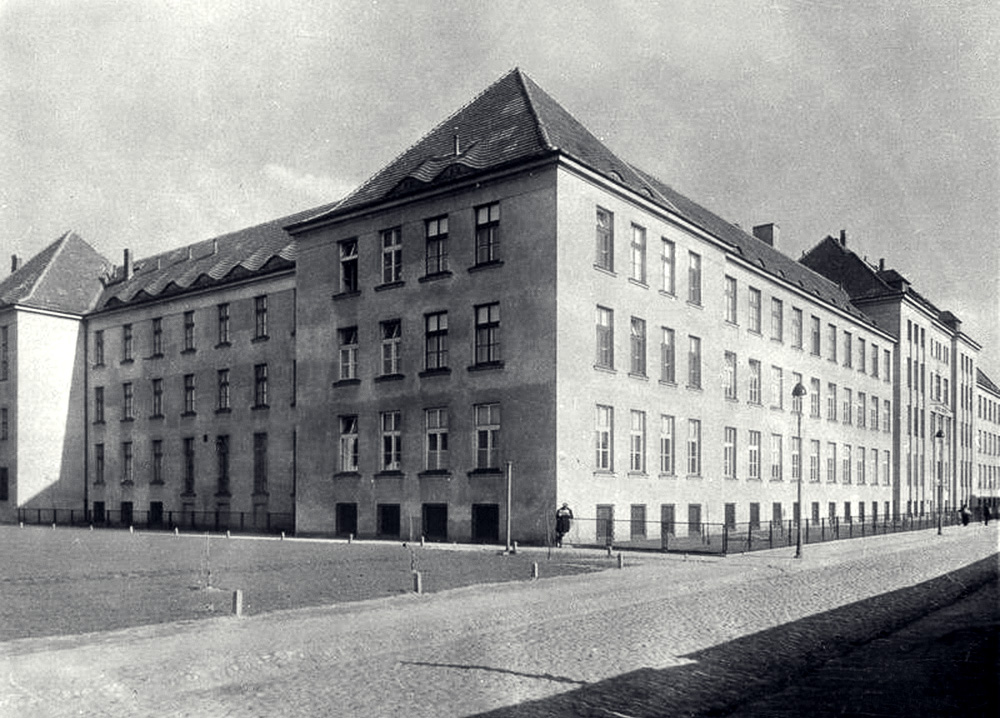
Wola Hospital building at 26 Płocka Street (now the headquarters of the Institute of Tuberculosis and Lung Diseases)

On 1 August 1944, the Warsaw Uprising began. Five days later, German SS and Ordnungspolizei units led by SS-Gruppenführer Heinz Reinefarth commenced the extermination of the residents of Wola. They stormed Wola Hospital, murdering its director, Dr. Piasecki, Professor Janusz Zeyland, and the hospital chaplain, Father Kazimierz Ciecierski. The remaining Poles were driven from the building and forced towards the railway workshops on Moczydło Street. (Note: Almost all the men – patients and staff members – who were taken from Wola Hospital to the railway workshops were shot that same day in the area of Górczewska and Moczydło streets (Geber & Halweg (2004, pp. 169–170, 174–179)).) At one point, surgeons Leon Manteuffel-Szoege and Stefan Wesołowski, as well as nurses Barbara Warda and Irena Dobrzańska, were taken from the column. The latter were directed to work at a German sanitary point on 53 Górczewska Street.

On 6 August, the German sanitary point, along with both Polish nurses, was moved to the Wola Hospital building. Meanwhile, Dr. Zbigniew Woźniewski, one of the few doctors who survived the massacre the day before, managed, with the help of several surviving staff members and personnel brought from the burned Karol and Maria Children's Hospital, to resume operations at Wola Hospital. Initially, they provided care to patients who had not been expelled from the hospital by the Germans and treated survivors of the Wola massacre. Later, they also began to assist civilians who were being driven out of the city by the Germans along Wolska Street towards the Warszawa Zachodnia station. During her free moments from working at the German sanitary point, Warda contributed to the efforts at the Polish hospital.

She stayed at Wola Hospital until 25 August, after which she was moved with the German sanitary point to the Malta Hospital on Senatorska Street. Whenever possible, she tried to return to Płocka Street, sometimes bringing back medicines and bandaging supplies taken from the Malta Hospital.

At one point, at the request of two young Polish forced laborers, she went to the basement of a nearby tenement to find them some clean clothes. However, the Germans became suspicious that she was passing information to insurgents who carried out a raid on German positions that same night at Bank Square. Consequently, she was accused of espionage and brought before a German military court. Thanks to the testimony of a German non-commissioned officer, who confirmed that she had gone to the basement solely in search of clothing, the court issued an acquittal.

Around 10 September, she moved with the German sanitary point to the Red Cross Hospital on Smolna Street in Powiśle. On 13 September, she was released by the Germans from work obligations and returned permanently to Wola Hospital.

Upon her return to Płocka Street, she focused primarily on the hospital's supply issues and the evacuation of patients, including traveling by horse-drawn cart to Pruszków for bread deliveries. She also facilitated the transfer of wounded and sick individuals from the church of St. Wojciech, which had been turned into a transit camp, to Wola Hospital. On 23 September, despite the prohibitions of the Gestapo from the so-called Sonderkommando Spilker, she extricated 13 prisoners – soldiers of the Home Army – who had been detained there. They were subsequently disguised as civilian patients and evacuated from the city later that same day, with the exception of two in the most critical condition.

By the end of October 1944, Wola Hospital was evacuated from Warsaw. For the following several months, she worked at one of its branches, which was established in the suburb of Pszczelin (near Brwinów).

=== Post-war fate ===
On 18 January 1945, upon hearing news of the Soviet offensive and the German retreat from Warsaw, she set out on foot with a group of Wola Hospital staff toward the ruined capital. They arrived the next day.

After the war, she continued working at Wola Hospital. Dr. Janina Misiewicz offered her the position of head nurse, but Warda decided to pursue the medical studies she had begun during the occupation, while also working as a surgical assistant at the hospital. In 1950, she earned her medical degree from the Medical Faculty of the University of Warsaw.

After completing her studies, she continued working at Wola Hospital – first as an assistant, and from 1957 as a senior assistant specializing in surgery and anesthesiology. Additionally, in 1953, she spent nine months working as an anesthesiologist at a Red Cross hospital in North Korea.

From 1960 to 1962, she worked at the Bielany Hospital as head of the operating block. She then worked at the Maria Skłodowska-Curie National Research Institute of Oncology. In 1973, she retired, but continued working until 1992 at an emergency medical center on Hoża Street in Warsaw.

She was a member of several organizations, including the Warsaw Medical Society, the Polish Nursing Society, the Polish Society of Surgeons, the Alumni Association of the Warsaw School of Nursing, the Friends of the Kutno Land Society, the Polish Tatra Society, and the Friends of the Royal Łazienki Society. For 35 years, she served as president of the Warsaw Friends of the Gostynin Region PTTK Club.

She died on 27 February 1999 and was laid to rest at the Northern Communal Cemetery in Warsaw (Section W-VII-13-5-5).

Her nursing cap is one of the exhibits at the Warsaw Rising Museum.

== Orders and decorations ==
She was awarded the following orders and decorations:

- Knight's Cross of the Order of Polonia Restituta (28 January 1954)
- Medal For Participation in the Defensive War of 1939
- Warsaw Uprising Cross
- Silver Cross of Merit
- Cross of the Home Army
- Medal of the 10th Anniversary of People's Poland (13 January 1955)
- Gold Honorary Badge of the Polish Tourist and Sightseeing Society
- Silver Honorary Badge For Merits to Warsaw
- Commemorative Medal Four Centuries of Warsaw as the Capital

She also received a North Korean decoration.

== Bibliography ==
- Geber, Halina; Halweg, Halina (2004). Szpital Dobrej Woli. Szpital Wolski 1939–1945 [Hospital of Good Will: Wola Hospital 1939–1945] (in Polish). Czytelnik Publishing House. ISBN 83-07-02980-5.
- Kopf, Stanisław (2004). Powstańcze służby sanitarne [Insurgent Sanitary Services] (in Polish). Warsaw: Warszawa Walczy 1939–1945. ISBN 83-11-09806-9.
