= Urszula Plenkiewicz =

Polish scout and liaison office (1921–2021)

- Born: Urszula Głowacka; 15 June 1921; Warsaw, Poland
- Died: 24 January 2021 (aged 99); Wrocław, Poland
- Occupations: Scout; Liaison officer
- Awards: Knight's Cross of the Order of Polonia Restituta; Cross of the Home Army; Auschwitz Cross; Righteous Among the Nations

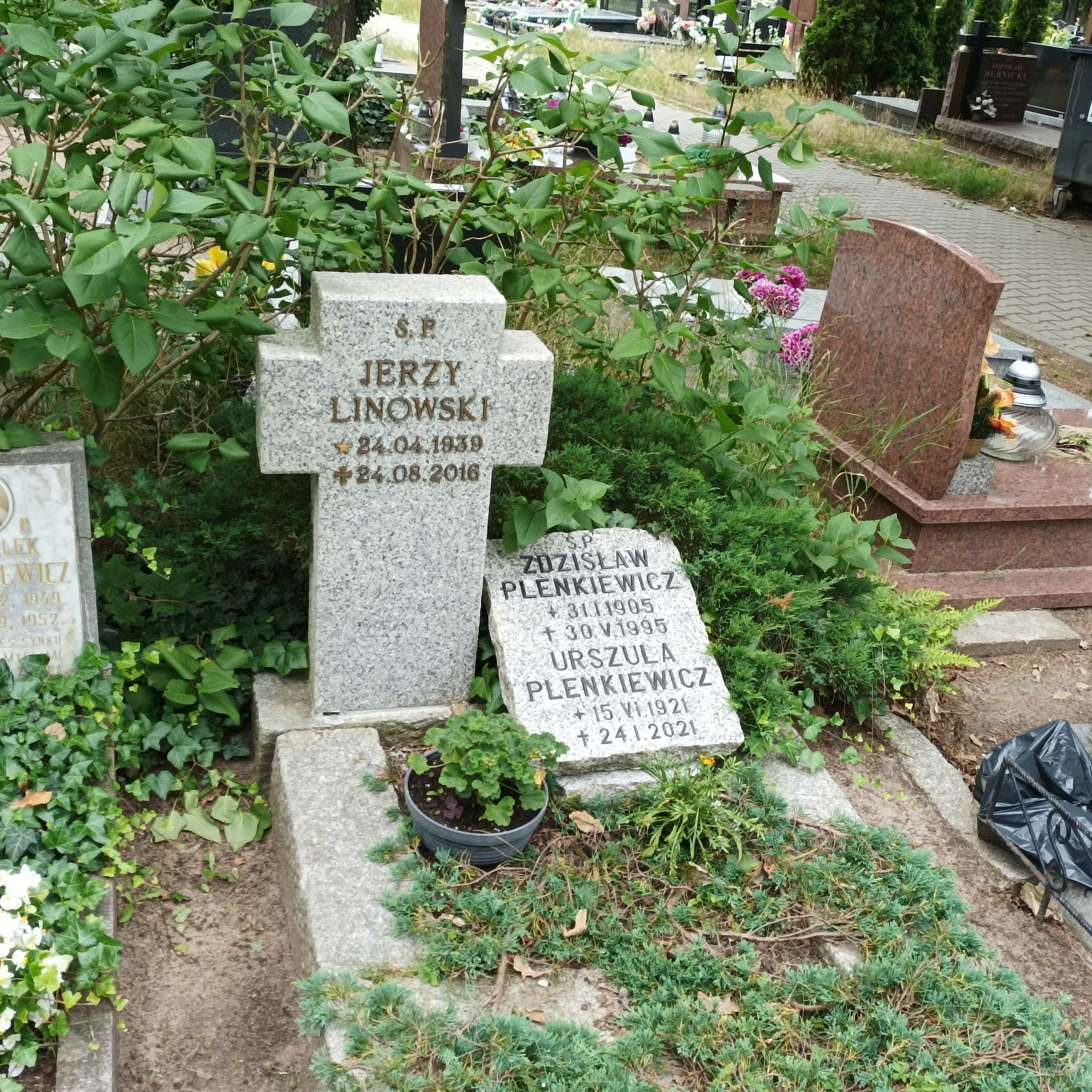
Urszula Plenkiewicz's grave at the Holy Family Cemetery, Wrocław.

Urszula Plenkiewicz (née Głowacka; 15 June 1921 – 24 January 2021) was a Polish scout and liaison officer of the Bureau of Information and Propaganda of the ZWZ-AK Main Command. She taught at the covert neighbourhood school and served as a soldier in the Sub-district V of Mokotów of the District of Warsaw Union of Armed Struggle. Plenkiewicz was apprehended by the Gestapo in November 1942 and deported to the female wing of the Auschwitz concentration camp known as Birkenau, where she escaped the death march in January 1945. She was awarded the Knight's Cross of the Order of Polonia Restituta, the Cross of the Home Army, and the Auschwitz Cross, as well as being recognised Righteous Among the Nations.

== Biography ==
Plenkiewicz was born in Warsaw, Poland on 15 June 1921. She was the daughter of Leokadia Gowacka and Feliks Gowacki, a state police officer who was murdered by the NKVD in Kalinin in 1940, and she had a younger sister. In order to serve Poland as a scout, Plenkiewicz joined the 14th Warsaw Female Scouting Team in 1935. Four years later, in May of that year, just before the Second World War, she completed her final exams at the all-girls ill|X LO im. Królowej Jadwigi in Warsaw school.

When Nazi Germany occupied Warsaw in September 1939 and enacted anti-Jewish decrees, she began teaching at the secret Girls' Gymnasium the following month. Plenkiewicz was able to assist Poles fleeing from the west of Germany from Wehrmacht soldiers, and they were sheltered in the school building, where she worked as a nurse. She would later shelter her school friend Krystyna Kon for a year beginning in November 1940, and she would organise false papers for Kon under the name Kowalska. Kon survived the war. Plenkiewicz enlisted in the Home Army as a soldier in the Sub-district V of Mokotów of the District of Warsaw Union of Armed Struggle in December 1940. She participated in minor sabotage actions in Wawer, held conspiratorial meetings in her apartment, before going on to join the Bureau of Information and Propaganda of the ZWZ-AK Main Command, where she became a liaison officer.

Plenkiewicz was arrested by the Gestapo in her Warsaw apartment on 2 November 1942, and was imprisoned at Pawiak prison the following day. She was interrogated at the Gestapo headquarters in Aleja Szucha before being transferred to the female wing of the Auschwitz concentration camp known as Birkenau on 27 November as prisoner No. 25985, which was tattoed on her forearm, and she worked in the hospital wing. Fearing the approaching Red Army, the Germans evacuated the camp in January 1945 and ordered a Death march as Plenkiewicz escaped from Auschwitz with a friend to the town of Oświęcim.

== Personal life ==
She resided in Wrocław following the conclusion of the war and became a mother. Plenkiewicz was a Roman Catholic; she died on 24 January 2021 and was buried at the Holy Family Cemetery in Wrocław following her funeral that took place on 1 February.

== Awards ==
Plenkiewicz was recognised as Righteous Among the Nations by Yad Vashem on 26 December 1994. She was a recipient of the Knight's Cross of the Order of Polonia Restituta, the Cross of the Home Army and the Auschwitz Cross.
