= Nazi war crimes during the Warsaw Uprising =

Nazi war crimes committed during the Warsaw Uprising

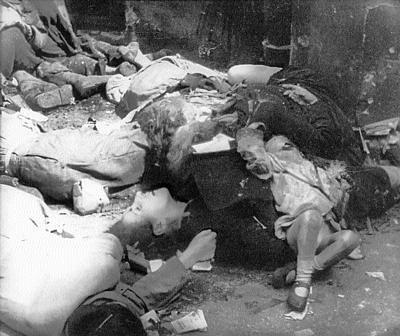
- Polish civilians murdered by Germans during the Warsaw Uprising, in the execution at 111 Marszałkowska Street
- Location: 52°13′48″N 21°00′39″E; Warsaw, German-occupied Poland (General Government)
- Date: 1 August–3 October 1944
- Attack type: Mass murders
- Deaths: approx. 150,000–180,000
- Perpetrator: Nazi Germany

Nazi war crimes during the Warsaw Uprising were the mass murders of civilians and prisoners of war, attacks on undefended civilian targets, rapes, deportations, looting, destruction of property, and other serious violations of the international humanitarian law committed by German police and military units participating in the suppression of the Warsaw Uprising.

Historians estimate that between 150,000 and 180,000 civilian residents of Warsaw died in August and September 1944, of which at least 63,000 were killed outside of combat operations. Approximately 550,000 residents of the capital and 100,000 people from towns near Warsaw were expelled, of whom almost 150,000 were sent to forced labor or Nazi concentration camps. As a result of the fighting in August and September 1944, as well as the systematic demolition and burning of the city carried out in the following months by German destruction units, 55% of Warsaw's pre-war buildings were destroyed.

== Hitler's order to destroy Warsaw ==
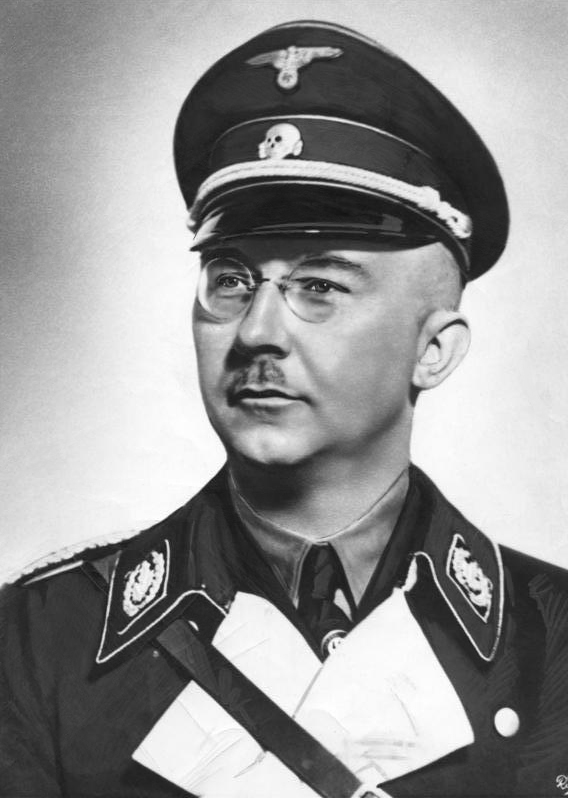
Heinrich Himmler

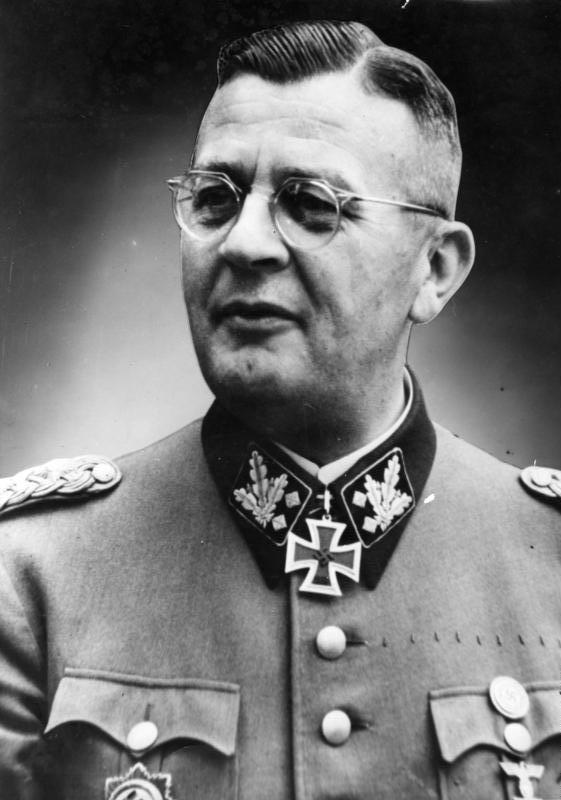
Erich von dem Bach

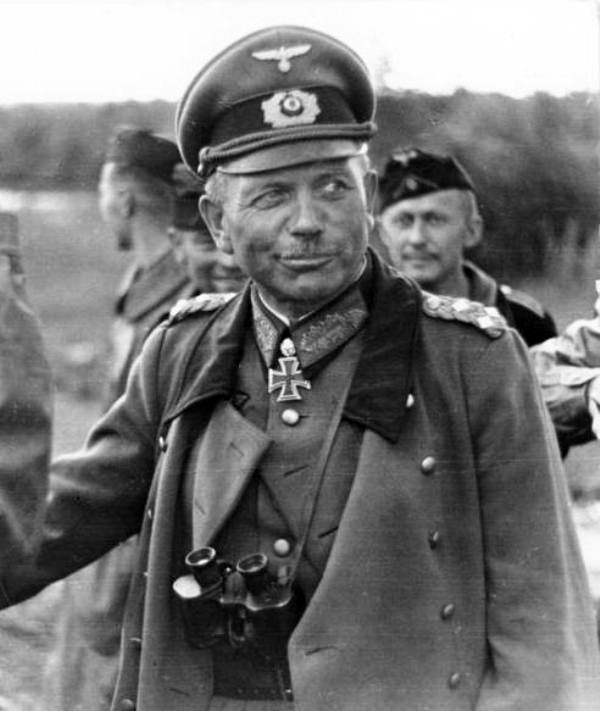
Heinz Guderian

Warsaw was considered by the German occupiers to be the center of Polish resistance against the Nazi "new order." Although the former capital of Poland had been downgraded to the status of a provincial town in the General Government, Warsaw remained the center of Polish political, intellectual, and cultural life. It was also the seat of the Polish Underground State and the location of particularly strong and well-organized resistance structures. Governor-General Hans Frank wrote in his diary on 14 December 1943: "If we did not have Warsaw in the General Government, we would not have four-fifths of the difficulties we have to contend with. Warsaw is and will remain a hotbed of confusion, a point from which unrest spreads throughout the country."

As early as 15 July 1940, Frank declared that "the Führer has decided that the reconstruction of Warsaw as a Polish metropolis is absolutely out of the question. The Führer wishes that, along with the general development of the General Government, Warsaw should be reduced to the status of a provincial town." The so-called Pabst Plan assumed that the population of Warsaw would be reduced to 130,000 inhabitants and its area to 15 square kilometres. The defeats suffered by the Third Reich on all fronts meant that the "Pabst Plan" was not implemented. Adolf Hitler therefore told Frank during a conversation on 6 February 1944 that "Warsaw must be destroyed as soon as the opportunity arises."

In this situation, the outbreak of the Warsaw Uprising on 1 August 1944 was treated by Nazi leaders as an ideal opportunity to solve the "Polish problem." During a speech to military district commanders and school commanders delivered in Jägerhöhe on 21 September 1944, Reichsführer-SS Heinrich Himmler mentioned that upon hearing the news of the uprising, he immediately went to Hitler, to whom he declared: "My Führer, the timing is not very favorable for us. From a historical point of view, however, it is a blessing that the Poles are doing this. In five or six weeks, we will get out of this. And after that, Warsaw, the capital, the head, the intelligentsia of this former nation of 16–17 million Poles will be destroyed, this nation that has been blocking our East for 700 years and has been in our way since the first Battle of Tannenberg. And then, historically, the Polish problem will no longer be a big issue for our children and for all those who come after us, or even for us ourselves."

Hitler's first reaction was to order the evacuation of all Germans from the city beyond its borders. Then, the German Luftwaffe was to "raze Warsaw to the ground through the mass use of all aircraft of the central front, including transport planes, and thus suppress the uprising." The task of organizing carpet bombing of Warsaw was given to the commander of the German 6th Air Fleet (Luftflotte 6), General Robert Ritter von Greim. However, it quickly became apparent that carrying out the order was unrealistic, since a number of German offices and military and police units had been cut off in the city, and their evacuation was temporarily impossible. In this situation, Hitler entrusted the task of organizing relief for the Warsaw garrison to Reichsführer-SS Himmler and the Chief of the General Staff of the Oberkommando des Heeres, General Heinz Guderian.

During a meeting held on the evening of 1 August 1944 or the following morning, Hitler gave Himmler and Guderian a verbal order to raze Warsaw to the ground and murder all its inhabitants. According to the account of SS-Obergruppenführer Erich von dem Bach, who was appointed commander of the forces assigned to suppress the uprising, the order was roughly as follows: "Every inhabitant is to be killed, no prisoners are to be taken. Warsaw is to be razed to the ground, thus setting a terrifying example for the whole of Europe." In turn, von dem Bach's chief of staff, SS-Brigadeführer Ernst Rode, testified after the war that SS-Oberführer Oskar Dirlewanger – commander of one of the units sent to fight the uprising – received a handwritten order from Himmler in pencil, in which the Reichsführer-SS announced on behalf of Hitler that Warsaw would be razed to the ground and that Dirlewanger himself was authorized to "kill whomever he wanted, according to his liking." Hitler's order to destroy Warsaw was also received by the commanders of the German garrison in the capital. SS-Oberführer Paul Otto Geibel, SS and Police Leader (SS- und Polizeiführer) for the Warsaw District, testified after the war that as early as the evening of 1 August, Himmler had instructed him by telephone: "Destroy tens of thousands."

Hitler's order applied not only to the SS and police units subordinate to Himmler, but also to Wehrmacht units, of which Oberkommando des Heeres was fully aware. Although General Guderian, when questioned by a Polish prosecutor, claimed that he had treated Hitler's words as a rhetorical figure and that the order had been passed on to the fighting units without the mediation of the Oberkommando des Heeres, during a telephone conversation with Hans Frank (3 August 1944, 9:10 PM), he himself assured that "everything will be done to come to the aid of Warsaw, and then a verdict will be passed on this city with utter ruthlessness." When von dem Bach attempted to soften the order to destroy Warsaw, Guderian refused to intercede with Hitler on this matter. (Note: In his testimony at the Nuremberg trials, SS-Brigadeführer Rode described a conversation he and von dem Bach had with Guderian on 2 or 3 August 1944: "We wanted Guderian to intercede with the Führer to revoke the order. However, Guderian flatly refused to mediate in this matter. He told us that it was a clear order from Hitler and that it would be impossible to revoke it. In any case, he did not want to get involved at all and was afraid of the responsibility for interceding. Bach tried several more times to persuade him to do so, but always without success [...] Bach and I thought that Guderian would never want to take responsibility for the destruction of this city. However, it turned out that this was not the case" (Sawicki (1949, pp. 105–106)).)

== Murder of prisoners of war and civilians ==
Of the approximately 150,000–180,000 civilian residents of Warsaw who died during the Warsaw Uprising, at least one-third were victims of executions carried out by German police and military units. Maja Motyl and Stanisław Rutkowski, authors of the study Powstanie Warszawskie – rejestr miejsc i faktów zbrodni (Warsaw Uprising – Register of Sites and Facts of Crimes), calculated that during the uprising, at least 63,000 civilian residents of the capital died outside of combat operations. Captured insurgents were also routinely murdered, even though they fought openly and wore the military insignia required by law, thus fighting in accordance with the Hague Convention.

=== Nazi crimes in the first days of the uprising ===
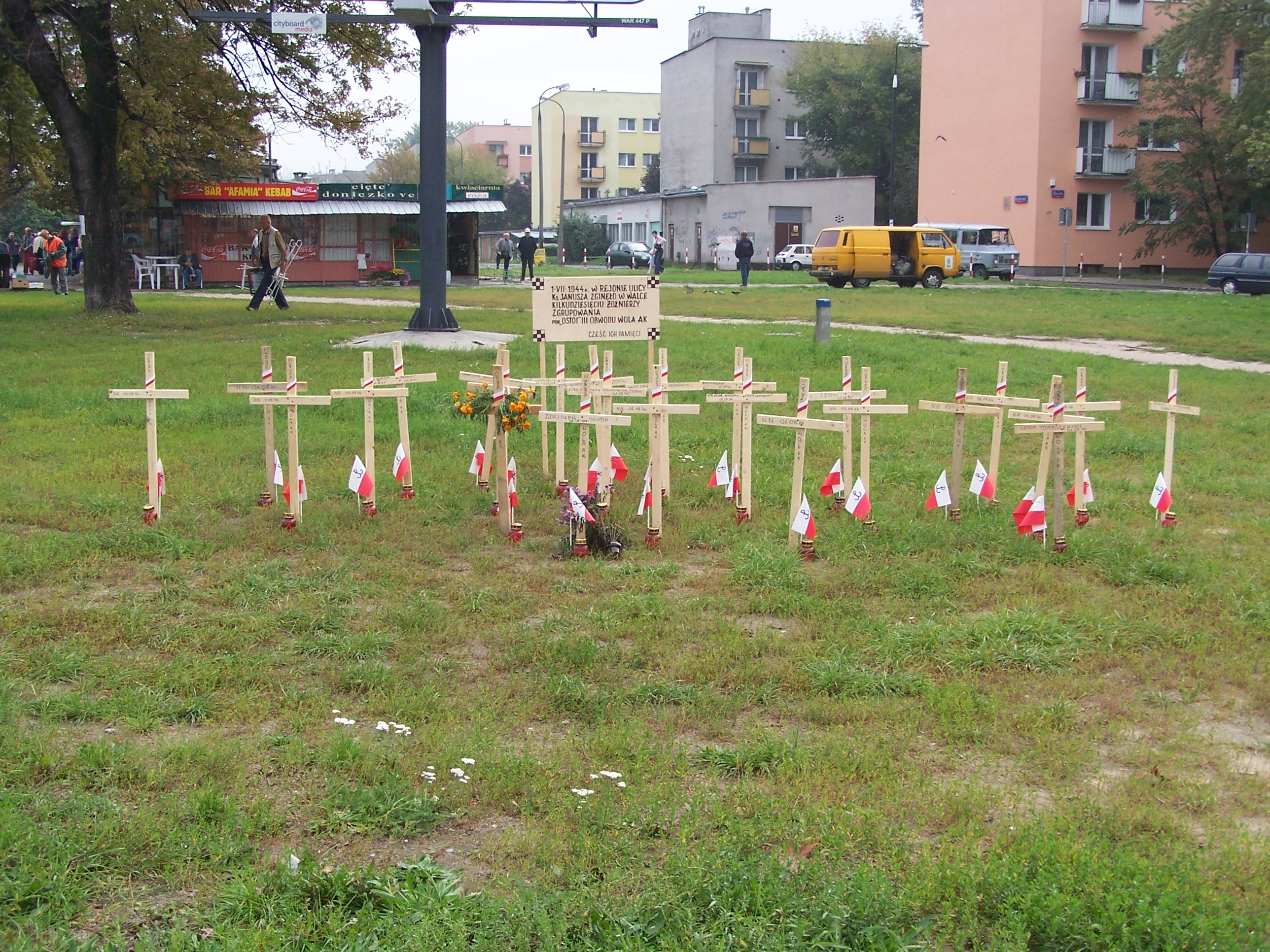
Crosses commemorating the fallen and murdered soldiers of the Ostoja Group in Wola

German troops stationed in Warsaw committed a series of war crimes on the very first day of the uprising, even before Hitler issued the order to destroy the city. Insurgents who were taken prisoner were shot, and the wounded were finished off. On 1 August, many soldiers of the Home Army were killed in this way, especially those from units that had been broken up during unsuccessful assaults on heavily fortified German strongpoints. Among those murdered were all the captured or wounded soldiers from Lieutenant Kosma's company, which was wiped out during an attack on the Sipo headquarters on Szuch Avenue, prisoners from the groups of Lieutenants Ostoja and Gromada – surprised and defeated by the Germans while taking up their starting positions in Wola, as well as soldiers from Mokotów Subdistrict who were taken prisoner after a failed attack on German strongpoints on Rakowiecka Street. The Germans also murdered soldiers of the Praga Subdistrict captured after a failed attack on the Poniatowski and Kierbedź bridges, wounded and captured insurgents from the Olza Battalion (defeated during the attack on Mokotów Fort) and the Karpaty Battalion (which attacked the horse racing track in Służewiec). Captured soldiers from the independent Subdistrict VI of the Home Army, which was defeated after a failed attack on Okęcie Airport, were also shot.

On 1 August, the first murders of civilians also took place. No special order from Hitler was necessary to begin them, since General Reiner Stahel, as commander of the Warsaw garrison, had the right to "use all means necessary to maintain peace, security, and order in relation to the civilian population of Warsaw." Immediately after the uprising began, Stahel declared a state of siege in the city and addressed the population (via the still functioning street loudspeakers) with a demand to remain calm. He threatened to demolish every house from which a shot was fired and to shoot every passerby on the street. These threats were carried out. German strongpoints were ordered to shoot without warning at any Pole within sight, regardless of whether they were participating in the fighting or not. German snipers (known as gołębiarze, "pigeon hunters") scattered throughout the city also terrorized the population from the very first hours of the uprising, killing many passersby. The first mass executions took place. On the night of 1–2 August, German soldiers stationed at Bema Fort shot 21 men from the house at 41 Powązkowska Street. From the buildings at 5 and 9 Flory Street, police officers from Jan Chrystian Szuch Avenue dragged out and shot all men over the age of 14. In Mokotów, Luftwaffe soldiers belonging to the Fliegerhorst-Kommandantur Warschau-Okecie (the Warsaw-Okęcie military airfield command) rounded up several hundred civilians and took them to Mokotów Fort. Many residents of Bachmacka, Baboszewska, and Syryńska streets were murdered, as well as several residents of the house at 97 Racławicka Street.

The executions intensified in the following days. Even before the arrival of German "relief forces," in the city, thousands of Warsaw residents were killed by soldiers and policemen belonging to the Warsaw garrison. Between 2 and 5 August 1944, the largest massacres took place mainly in Mokotów, Wola, and Śródmieście.

==== Mokotów ====
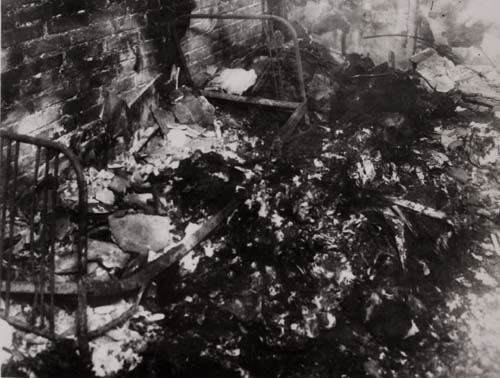
Jesuit monastery in Mokotów – site of the massacre

On 2 August, SS officers from the barracks on Rakowiecka Street (Stauferkaserne) shot approximately 600 prisoners held in the Mokotów Prison at 37 Rakowiecka Street. Faced with imminent death, some of the prisoners actively resisted the SS men, thanks to which several hundred inmates managed to escape and reach the area controlled by the insurgents. On the same day, SS men from Stauferkaserne also murdered several dozen people hiding in the Jesuit Writers' House at 61 Rakowiecka Street.

On 3 and 4 August, military police from the headquarters on Dworkowa Street carried out several raids aimed at terrorizing the civilian population. They murdered several hundred residents of houses on 49/51 Belgijska Street, 69/71 Puławska Street, and 1 and 3 Szustra Street. Some of the victims were killed in their flats and in the courtyards of tenements, while others were shot on the steps near the escarpment (now Eye of the Sea Park). On Olesińska Street, military police gathered several hundred civilians in the basements of houses at numbers 5 and 7, and then killed them with grenades. Murders also took place in other areas of the district. Between 2 and 4 August, SS men from the barracks on Rakowiecka Street and German airmen from the barracks on Puławska Street (Flakkaserne) murdered over 100 residents of Bukowińska, Madaliński, Rakowiecka, and Sandomierska streets. On 5 August, SS men and police officers sent from Szuch Avenue murdered about 100 residents of houses at 3 and 5 Skolimowska Street and about 80 residents of a house at 11 Puławska Street. Among the victims were some of the insurgents hiding there, including Captain Leon Światopełk-Mirski, codenamed Leon – commander of the Mokotów Subdistrict.

Starting on 2 August, SS men from Stauferkaserne began herding people from nearby streets into the barracks. A makeshift prison for the inhabitants of Mokotów was set up in Stauferkaserne. Most of those held there were men, who were treated as hostages and subjected to camp conditions – starved and forced to perform exhausting labor. Numerous executions took place on the barracks grounds, claiming the lives of at least 100 people. In addition, many of the men imprisoned in the Stauferkaserne were transported in Gestapo vans to an unknown destination and disappeared without trace, probably murdered in the vicinity of the Sicherheitspolizei headquarters on Szuch Avenue.

==== Wola ====
Between 1 and 4 August, units of the 1st Fallschirm-Panzer Division Hermann Göring stationed in Wola murdered approximately 400 captured insurgents, including many wounded. At the same time, units of this division, supported by soldiers of the Wehrmacht's 608th Security Regiment, systematically expelled the Polish population, committing murders, looting, and rape. On 3 August, the Germans murdered with grenades residents hiding in the basements of houses at 12, 14, and 16 Młynarska Street.

==== Śródmieście ====
On 3 and 4 August, Wehrmacht soldiers belonging to the 4th East Prussian Panzergrenadier Regiment attempted to unblock the section of Jerusalem Avenue held by the insurgents, attacking from the vicinity of the National Museum towards the Warszawa Główna railway station. Residents of Praga and 3 Maja Avenue were forced to run in front of the tanks and in the middle of the German column as "human shields." Several dozen hostages were killed in the crossfire. In addition, East Prussian grenadiers committed a series of murders – among others, residents of houses at 19 Jerusalem Avenue and 17 Bracka Street were shot (Antoni Przygoński estimated the total number of people murdered at around 100). Almost 4,000 civilians were herded into the basements of the National Museum, where, only after 24 hours had passed, they were given some food and doctors were allowed to help the wounded. Under the viaduct of the Poniatowski Bridge, 19 captured insurgents from the Krybar Group were also shot. These crimes were committed with the knowledge and approval of the German command. Walther Brunon Dolingkeit, a captured soldier of the 4th East Prussian Panzergrenadier Regiment (a Protestant pastor in civilian life), testified that his unit had received orders to kill all men they encountered, remove women and children from their homes, and burn buildings. The command of the German 9th Army treated the civilians imprisoned in the National Museum as hostages. (Note: The evening situation report of the 9th Army from 4 August 1944 stated that out of almost 4,000 Warsaw residents herded into the museum's basements, "women and children will be released tonight after being instructed that if the fire is not stopped by 8:00 AM, they would have the bandits to thank for the shooting of their husbands and fathers, as well as all other men, because the soldiers are unable to distinguish between friend and foe." Ultimately, however, this threat was not carried out (Przygoński (1980, p. 242, vol. I)).)

Furthermore, on 3 August, in the courtyard of the house at 111 Marszałkowska Street the crew of a German armored car shot and killed approximately 30–44 Polish civilians. On the same day, in the so-called Professors' House at 5 Nowy Zjazd Street, German soldiers murdered about 15 men, including professors of the University of Warsaw: Józef Rafacz, Andrzej Tretiak, Wacław Roszkowski, and Eugeniusz Wajgiel.

==== Outside Warsaw ====
Crimes directly related to the outbreak of the uprising also took place outside Warsaw during those days. On 2 August, units of the Ochota Subdistrict retreating from the city towards the Sękocin and Chojnów forests encountered strong German units near Pęcice. During the fighting, 67 insurgents were taken prisoner, 60 of whom – after being beaten – were shot in a nearby brickyard. On 3 August, SS troops pacified the settlement of Wawrzyszew near Warsaw (now a neighbourhood in the Bielany district of Warsaw), where over 30 residents were murdered and the settlement itself was partially burned down. In addition, upon hearing news of the outbreak of the uprising, Himmler ordered the murder of the commander-in-chief of the Home Army, General Stefan Rowecki, codenamed Grot, who was being held in the Sachsenhausen concentration camp.

=== Extermination of the population of South Downtown ===
Contrary to popular belief, the mass and organized extermination of the population of Warsaw began not in Wola, but in South Downtown – in the vicinity of the so-called police district. Starting on 2 August, (Note: According to some witnesses, as many as 980 people were murdered in the ruins of the General Inspectorate of the Armed Forces on 1 August 1944. However, it is generally accepted that mass executions began there around 2–3 August 1944 (Przygoński (1980, p. 240, vol. I)).) SS and police units subordinate to SS-Oberführer Geibel and his right-hand man, Ludwig Hahn (commander of the SD and Security Police in Warsaw), systematically burned houses and drove the Polish population from the streets near the Sipo headquarters on Szuch Avenue, where quick selections were made.

Initially, the SS and police carried out mass executions in the Jordan Garden on Bagatela Street. The bodies of the murdered were piled up and burned directly in the garden. From 4 August, in order to keep the executions secret, Poles were shot and burned in the ruins of the southern wing of the General Inspectorate of the Armed Forces building at 1/3 Ujazdów Avenue, which had been destroyed in September 1939. In both places, it was mainly men and boys who were murdered, but in the first days of the uprising (2–5 August), women and children were also killed, including female tram workers. At first, it was mostly residents of South Downtown who were shot in the vicinity of the Sipo headquarters. After Hitler's extermination order was revoked, the number of executions in the ruins of the General Inspectorate of the Armed Forces slightly decreased. Cases of murdering women and children also became less frequent. Between 11 and 20 August, an average of 5–6 groups were brought in for execution, and later, individual persons or small groups of people.

The Germans used prisoners from the "educational labor camp of the security police," which was located in the pre-war Bauman Orphanage at 14 Litewska Street, to burn the bodies and sort the clothing and belongings of the victims. Every eight days, groups of prisoners assigned to cover up the traces of the crimes were shot by the Germans in order to eliminate witnesses. As a result, by mid-September 1944, only 12 prisoners remained out of a group of nearly 100.

Maja Motyl and Stanisław Rutkowski estimated that in the summer of 1944, the Germans murdered between 5,000 and 6,000 Poles on the grounds of the General Inspectorate of the Armed Forces and Jordan Garden at Bagatela Street. The Institute of National Remembrance estimates that the number of victims could have been as high as 10,000. The scale of the crimes committed there is evidenced by information contained in the report of the Chief Commission for the Prosecution of Crimes against the Polish Nation in Warsaw from July 1946, which states that the human ashes found in the basements of the General Inspectorate weighed 5,578 kilograms. Mass executions of residents of South Downtown also took place in other parts of the district. In the first days of August, the Germans murdered about 100 Polish men near the Anca Pharmacy at 21 Marszałkowska Street. Another 200 people were murdered in the immediate vicinity of the Sipo headquarters on Szuch Avenue.

=== Wola massacre ===
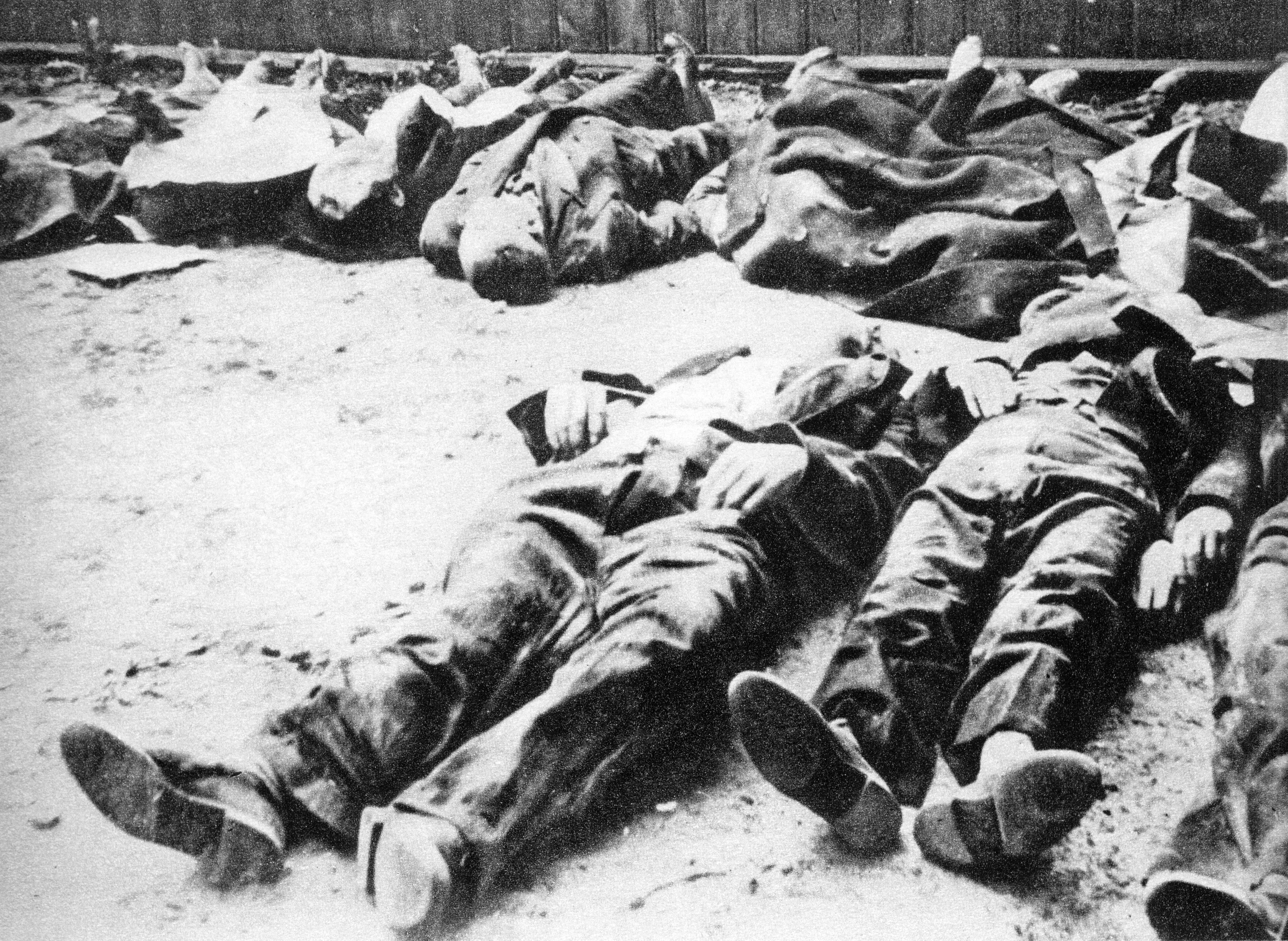
Victims of the Wola massacre

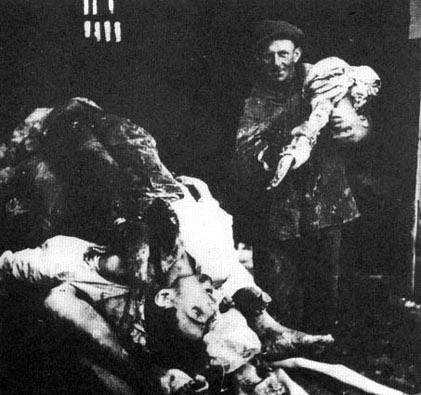
Burning of bodies by the Verbrennungskommando

On 4 August, the first units of the German "relief forces" commanded by SS-Gruppenführer Heinz Reinefarth appeared in Warsaw's Wola district. This group included, among others, 16 companies of police from the occupied Wartheland, and the Dirlewanger Brigade, known for its cruelty, composed of German criminals pulled from prisons and concentration camps. Reinefarth's troops began murdering the population of Wola on 4 August. The first executions took place at Kazimierz Franaszek's factory and at the railway viaduct on Górczewska Street.

However, the mass and systematic slaughter of the population of Wola began in earnest on 5 August. That day entered history as "Black Saturday." From 7:00 AM, Reinefarth and Dirlewanger's troops launched assaults on the insurgent barricades blocking Wolska and Górczewska streets. At the same time, in the newly captured parts of Wola – as well as in those areas of the district that had been under German control since the first hours of the uprising – soldiers of the "relief forces" massacred the Polish civilian population on a mass scale. Following Hitler's order to the letter, they killed every captured Pole, regardless of age or gender. Initially, the population of Wola was murdered immediately – in flats, basements, courtyards of tenements, and on the streets. Some houses were set on fire, and those who tried to escape were shot with machine guns. In this way, thousands of residents of the so-called Hankiewicz houses at 105/109 Wolska Street (approximately 2,000 victims) and the Wawelberg houses at 15 Górczewska Street (approximately 2,000–3,000 victims) were killed. In some places, the population was herded into courtyards or basements of tenements and then murdered with grenades. Acts of exceptional sadism were committed – among others, in the Orthodox orphanage at 149 Wolska Street, SS men from Dirlewanger's regiment murdered several dozen children by smashing their heads with rifle butts.

In the second half of the day, the slaughter took on a more organized character. The population of Wola was herded to several selected execution sites on Wolska and Górczewska streets (these were mostly large buildings and factory yards, parks, cemeteries, etc.) and murdered en masse, usually with machine guns. At least several thousand Poles – men, women, and children – were murdered at that time in places such as: the area of Górczewska Street and Moczydło streets, especially near the railway tracks (between 4,500 and 10,000 victims); the Ursus factory at 55 Wolska Street (between 6,000 and 7,500 victims); the K. Franaszek's factory at 41/45 Wolska Street (between 4,000 and 6,000 victims); Sowiński Park (approximately 1,500 victims); the tram depot at 2 Młynarska Street (approximately 1,000 victims); and the grounds of the forge at 122/124 Wolska Street (approximately 700 victims). Witnesses recalled that in these places, piles of corpses sometimes reached approximately 25–35 metres in length, 15–20 metres in width, and 2 metres in height. The Germans did not spare hospitals either – patients and staff of the Wola Hospital (over 360 victims) and St. Lazarus Hospital (approximately 1,200 victims) were murdered. Only St. Stanislaus Infectious Diseases Hospital was spared. Antoni Przygoński estimated that 45,500 residents of Wola were murdered on 5 August 1944.

On the afternoon of 5 August, SS-Obergruppenführer Erich von dem Bach arrived in Wola and took command of the forces assigned to suppress the uprising. In the evening of the same day, Bach partially softened Hitler's extermination order. Specifically, he prohibited the murder of women and children, who were to be sent to a transit camp in Pruszków near Warsaw. The order to liquidate all Polish men remained in force, and not all frontline units immediately began to comply with the new guidelines. As a result, the massacre in Wola continued on 6 August. Around 10,000 Poles were murdered that day, mainly residents of Chłodna, Leszno, Towarowa, and Żelazna streets. Among those killed were patients of the Karol and Maria Hospital at 136 Leszno Street (between 200 and 300 victims) and about 30 priests and monks from the Redemptorist monastery at 49 Karolkowa Street. A series of murders of residents of Wola and the western quarters of North Downtown also took place on 7 August. Having taken control of the Wolska Street–Chłodna Street–Saxon Garden thoroughfare that day, the Germans herded hundreds of men onto this route, forcing them to remove barricades and rubble. Later, most of them were shot in the Mier Halls. Antoni Przygoński estimated that approximately 3,800 Poles were murdered in Wola on 7 August.

The district was littered with tens of thousands of corpses, so in order to prevent an epidemic and cover up the traces of the crime, the Germans established the so-called Verbrennungskommando on 6 August. It consisted of about 100 young and strong Polish men who had been excluded from the group of people murdered in Wola. The Verbrennungskommando was responsible for burning the bodies of the massacre victims. Only a few of its members managed to escape (thanks to bribes or the goodwill of the guards) and survive the war.

Historians disagree on the number of victims of the genocide committed in Wola. Antoni Przygoński estimated that the number of people murdered exceeded 65,000, of whom 59,400 were killed on 5–7 August. According to Adam Borkiewicz, Władysław Bartoszewski, and Krzysztof Dunin-Wąsowicz, the Wola massacre claimed approximately 38,000 victims. Joanna K. M. Hanson and Alexandra Richie estimated the number of victims at around 30,000–40,000. Tadeusz Komorowski estimated that it reached 30,000, while Maria Turlejska, Marek Getter, and Andrzej Janowski estimated it at least 20,000. According to West German historian Hans von Krannhals, approximately 10,000–15,000 Polish civilians were murdered in Wola. Polish researcher Marek Strok also estimates the number of victims of the massacre at around 15,000.

Szymon Datner described the Wola massacre as "one of the bloodiest pages in the history of the martyrdom of the Polish nation," while Norman Davies considered 5 and 6 August 1944 to be "the two darkest days in the history of Warsaw."

=== Pacification of Ochota ===
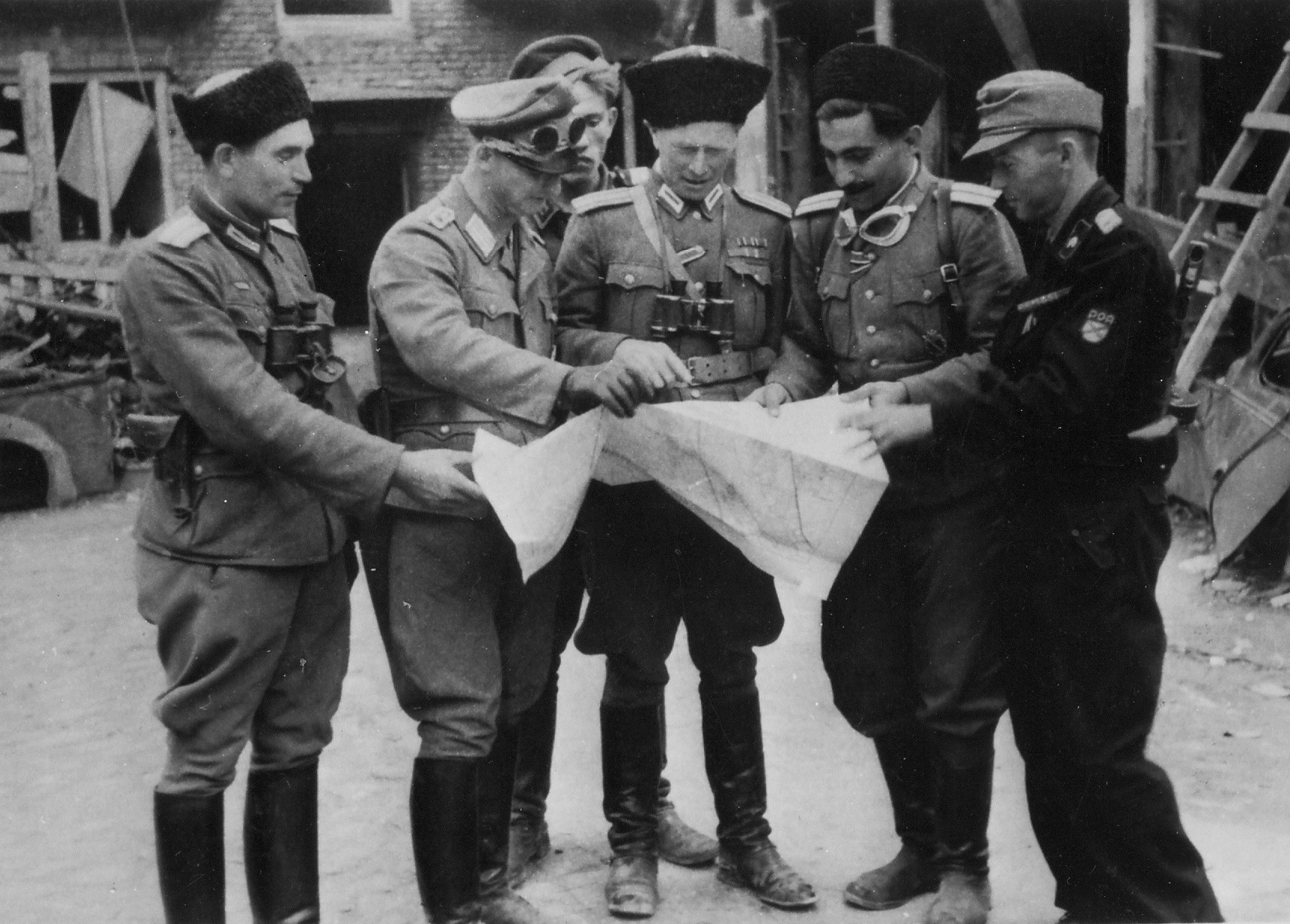
Command of RONA brigade

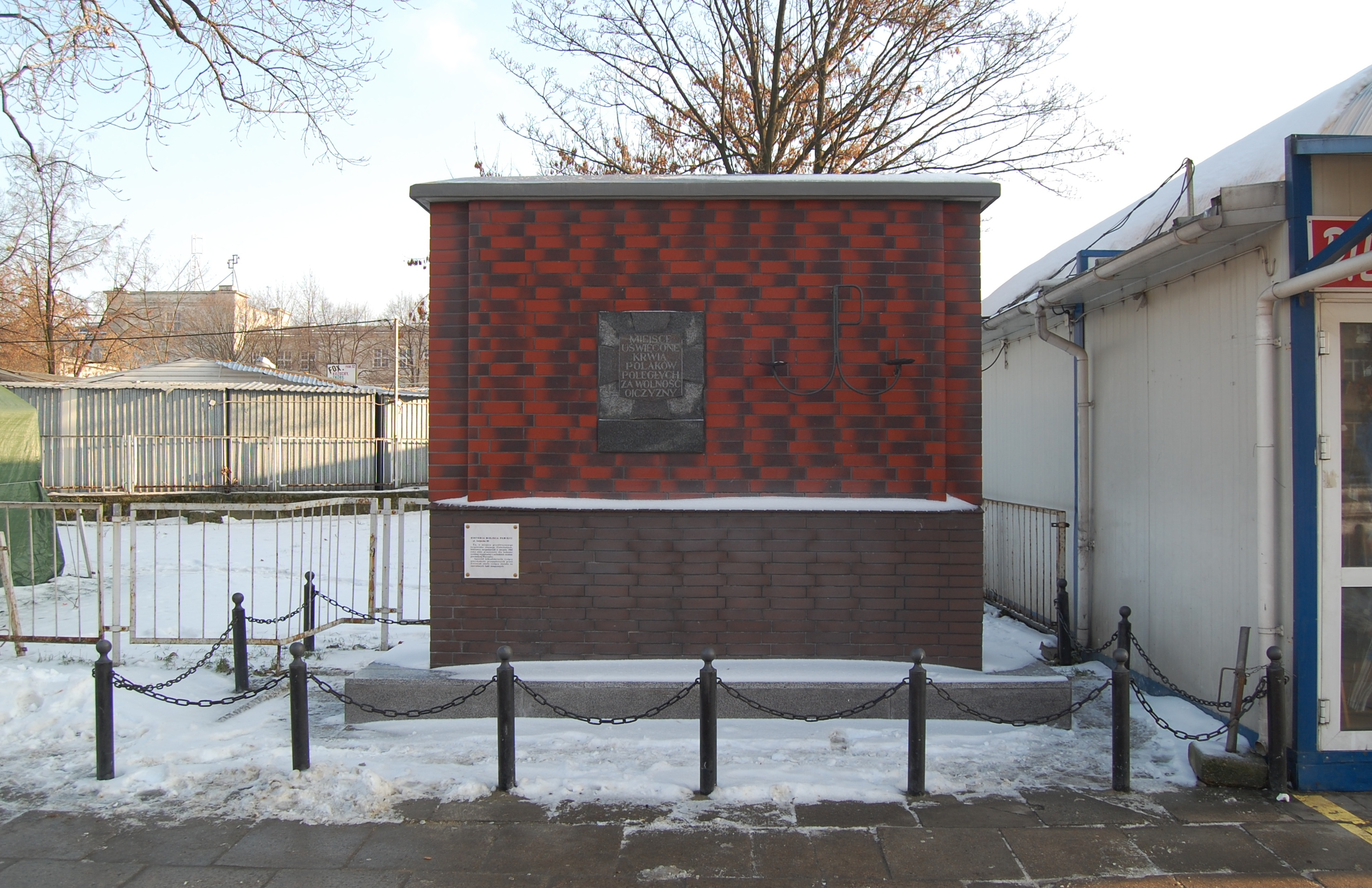
Monument commemorating the victims of Zieleniak

On 3 August, the first soldiers of the collaborationist SS RONA brigade (Russian People's Liberation Army), commanded by SS-Brigadeführer Bronislav Kaminski, arrived in Okęcie. The brigade – or rather its collective regiment commanded by Major Ivan Frolov – began a bloody pacification of the Ochota district on 4 August. The mass crimes began with the pogrom of the residents of Opaczewska Street. The pacification of the district lasted until approximately 12 August. During this time, Kaminski's soldiers committed hundreds of murders, rapes, lootings, and arsons. The most serious crimes took place especially at the Zieleniak vegetable market, Kolonia Staszica, and the Maria Skłodowska-Curie Radium Institute.

The pacification of Ochota was extremely brutal, but unlike in Wola, there was no mass and systematic slaughter of the population, mostly because the soldiers of the RONA brigade were mainly interested in rape, drunkenness, and looting. In Ochota, however, there were many, usually spontaneous, executions of smaller groups of people. Very often, there were also individual killings carried out by RONA soldiers for resisting attempts at rape or looting, for delaying the march, or for "entertainment." In addition, many people were killed as a result of indiscriminate shooting by drunk soldiers. A series of murders took place in particular in houses on Grójecka Street (numbers 20B, 24, 81, 104), where between 4 and 5 August, Germans and RONA soldiers murdered about 280 people, including numerous women and children. Many civilians were killed there in executions or in basements littered with grenades. Similar murders also took place in houses at 4 Korzeniowski Street (approximately 40 victims) and 217/223 Independence Avenue (53 victims). On two occasions (5–6 August and 19 August), soldiers from the RONA brigade pacified the Radium Institute on Wawelska Street. The hospital was burned down and about 80 people (mostly patients and a few staff members) were murdered. Female patients and employees of the institute were raped. RONA soldiers also murdered several wounded people from the insurgent hospital on Marian Langiewicz Street. The nurses caring for them were raped. In addition, German policemen from the barracks in the Academic House on Narutowicz Square committed a series of crimes against the population of Ochota, including the murder of 38 hostages near the building.

On 4 August, a transit camp for the expelled population of Ochota was set up on the grounds of the Zieleniak vegetable market, where several thousand civilians had gathered by the evening of the following day. There were no sanitary facilities in the camp. The prisoners were also deprived of water, food (they only received portions of moldy bread from time to time) and medical care. Hundreds of people (mainly the elderly and children) died at Zieleniak from hunger, thirst, or extreme exhaustion. Drunken soldiers constantly roamed the square, robbing the displaced and pulling young women and girls out of the crowd, whom they later raped in the market square or in the nearby Hugo Kołłątaj High School. Soldiers often shot at prisoners for entertainment or carried out executions for the most trivial reasons. In total, about a thousand residents of Ochota died at Zieleniak, of which about 300 were murdered by RONA soldiers.

The final act of pacification in Ochota was the crimes committed after the fall of the last insurgent stronghold in the district – the so-called Wawel Redoubt (11 August). RONA soldiers murdered about 80 people there, mainly men and the wounded. There were also cases of looting and rape. According to Józef Kazimierz Wroniszewski, the total number of victims of the pacification of Ochota is estimated at 10,000.

=== Revocation of the extermination order ===
On the evening of 5 August, von dem Bach – presumably with the knowledge and consent of Nazi leaders – softened Hitler's extermination order. The murder of women and children was prohibited, but the order to liquidate all Polish men remained in force. Von dem Bach's decision was based not so much on humanitarian motives as on pragmatic calculations. Bach quickly realized that mass murders only strengthened the Poles' will to resist, and that the soldiers of the "relief forces," busy with murder, rape, and looting, were unable to carry out offensive operations against the insurgents. Moreover, from the very beginning, he intended to suppress the uprising through a combination of political and military factors, as he feared that the use of purely forceful solutions would prevent him from achieving what he considered his main goal – the quick elimination of the dangerous flashpoint behind the Eastern Front, which Warsaw, engulfed by the uprising, had become. On 12 August, Bach further moderated Hitler's order by issuing a ban on the murder of Polish civilian men. Economic considerations were also taken into account at that time. At this stage of the war, the Third Reich could not afford to waste such a large reservoir of potential labor. During post-war interrogations, SS-Oberführer Geibel testified that in the first days of August 1944, Bach quoted Hitler as saying that "500,000 workers in the Reich equals a battle won."

However, this did not mean that the Germans had completely abandoned their extermination efforts. The order to liquidate all captured insurgents remained in force. In addition, on 8 August, a special German Security Police unit, the so-called Einsatzkommando der Sicherheitspolizei bei der Kampfgruppe Reinefarth (also known as Sonderkommando "Spilker"), began operating alongside the units of the Reinefarth Combat Group. The task of this unit, headed by SS-Hauptsturmführer Alfred Spilker, was to carry out "selections" of the expelled population of Warsaw by picking out and liquidating people considered "undesirable." The group of "undesirable" people included mainly those suspected of participating in the uprising or of Jewish origin, as well as the wounded, sick, and infirm (those unable to work and unable to reach the camp in Pruszków on their own) or representatives of certain social groups (mostly the intelligentsia and clergy). The selection criteria were so fluid that, in practice, any person who for some reason did not appeal to the SS men could be pulled out of the crowd. Members of Sonderkommando "Spilker" carried out selections at assembly points in the city where the expelled population of Warsaw was gathered. The execution of "undesirable people" took place mainly at 59 Okopowa Street in Wola, near the Pfeiffer tannery. The preserved reports of the Einsatzkommando include information about the shooting of 1,309 people during the 10 days of the second half of August and the first two days of September. However, the number of victims of Spilker's commando was certainly higher. Witness testimonies indicate that at least 5,000 people – residents of various districts of Warsaw – were murdered in the vicinity of the Pfeiffer tannery during the uprising.

The area near the Pfeiffer tannery was mainly used for murdering residents of Warsaw's northern districts – Wola, the Old Town, North Downtown, and Powiśle. The place of "selection" for the expelled population of the southern districts of Warsaw was the vicinity of the Sipo headquarters on Szuch Avenue. The "undesirable people" picked out from the crowd – residents of Upper Mokotów, Sielce, Siekierki, and Powiśle Czerniakowskie – were murdered in the ruins of the General Inspectorate of the Armed Forces. The "selections" and executions were carried out by Gestapo officers from Szuch Avenue, who were subordinate to Geibel.

=== Old Town ===
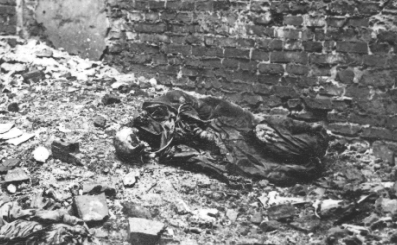
Body of one of the victims of the execution in the ruins of the National Opera

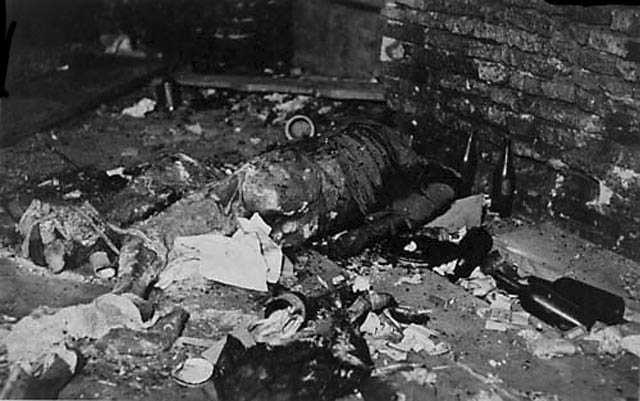
Remains of wounded people murdered in the hospital at 7 Długa Street

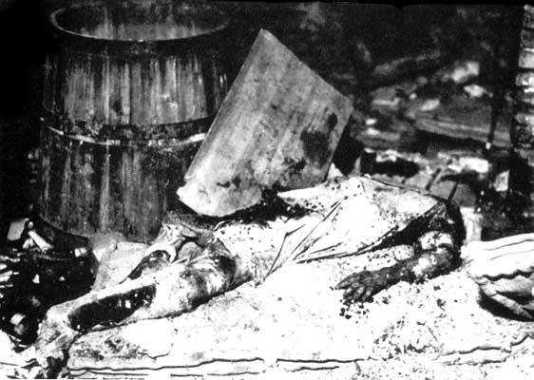
Hospital at 9 Długa Street

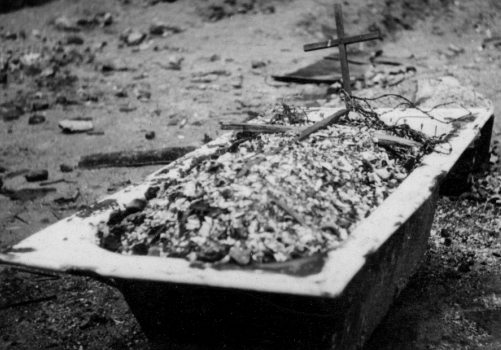
Bathtub containing human ashes found at Wąski Dunaj Street

During the fighting for Warsaw's Old Town, German troops committed a series of crimes against prisoners of war and civilians. As early as 8 and 9 August, SS men from Dirlewanger's regiment fighting in the vicinity of Theatre Square murdered 350 Polish men in the ruins of the National Opera. In addition, between 8 and 10 August, several hundred civilians were murdered in mass executions on Kozia, Senatorska, Alberta, and Niecała streets, as well as in the Saxon Garden.

Occupying successive quarters of the Old Town, units of the Reinefarth Combat Group brutally expelled civilians from their homes, committing numerous murders, rapes, and looting. "Undesirable people" isolated from the crowd of refugees were murdered on the spot or in the Pfeiffer tannery in Wola. Wounded or captured insurgents were also killed. After the fall of Muranów on 21 August, the Germans murdered about 200 Polish civilians in the courtyard of a house at 17 Dzika Street. The victims were mainly men from Muranów and elderly people from a nursing home at Przebieg Street. In the basements of the captured Polish Security Printing Works, approximately 30–50 patients of the insurgent hospital were murdered, along with the doctor who was caring for them (28 August). In the New Town, several hundred elderly and disabled people from nursing homes at Przyrynek, Franciszkańska, and Zakroczymska streets were murdered (29 and 31 August).

On 2 September, the Old Town fell, abandoned the day before by insurgent troops who evacuated through the sewers to Śródmieście or Żoliborz. At that time, there were about 2,500 seriously wounded insurgents (unable to evacuate through the sewers) and some of the medical personnel caring for them, as well as nearly 35,000 civilians (of whom about 5,000 were wounded) remaining in the district. A few hours after taking control of the Old Town, the Germans carried out a massacre in the insurgent hospitals. Hundreds of seriously wounded patients were shot or burned alive, including in the central insurgent hospital in the Raczyński Palace at 7 Długa Street (about 430 victims), in the Pod Krzywą Latarnią hospital at 25 Podwale Street (about 100 victims), in the Czarny Łabędź hospital at 46 Podwale Street (about 30 victims), in the hospital at 1/3 Jan Kiliński Street (about 50 victims), and in many others. Those wounded who were able to move on their own were picked out of the crowd of refugees and murdered in places of mass executions on Wąski Dunaj Street, Castle Square, or in the Pfeiffer tannery. There were cases of medical personnel being murdered. Female insurgent medics and lightly wounded female patients were raped.

On 2 September, German troops also committed a series of crimes against the civilian population of the district. The cellars where civilians were hiding were pelted with grenades or set on fire with gasoline, and people fleeing in panic were murdered with machine gun fire. Only after some time did the German command order the slaughter to be stopped and all civilians capable of moving on their own to be removed from the Old Town. The population was brutally driven out of basements and shelters, given only a few minutes to leave the premises. Those who hesitated or resisted were murdered on the spot. Then the houses were set on fire with those people who had not yet managed to leave them. At assembly points (Castle Square, Stawki Street, Romuald Traugutt Park, the Pfeiffer factory, Church of St. Stanislaus in Wola), the expelled were subjected to "selections." The wounded, the sick, the elderly, the infirm, those suspected of participating in the uprising, or people who had simply offended the escort soldiers were pulled out of the crowd and murdered. The displacement was accompanied by rape and looting.

In total, after the fall of the Old Town, the Germans murdered at least 3,000 people, including almost 1,000 wounded insurgents. According to some sources, the number of those murdered could have been as high as 5,000 or 7,000. During the entire battle for the Old Town, approximately 30,000 to 40,000 Polish civilians were killed, of which, according to Antoni Przygoński, between 8,000 and 10,000 were murdered directly by German soldiers. Most of the surviving residents of the Old Town were sent to concentration camps. (Note: At the end of August 1944, the head of the Reich Security Main Office, SS-Obergruppenführer Ernst Kaltenbrunner, recommended to the command of Army Group Centre that, due to "serious considerations of police security," the bulk of able-bodied men and women from Warsaw be sent to work in concentration camps. Only women with small children could be treated as Polish civilian workers and placed at the disposal of the General Plenipotentiary for Labour Deployment, Fritz Sauckel (Przygoński (1980, p. 506, vol. II)).)

=== Nazi crimes in other districts of Warsaw ===
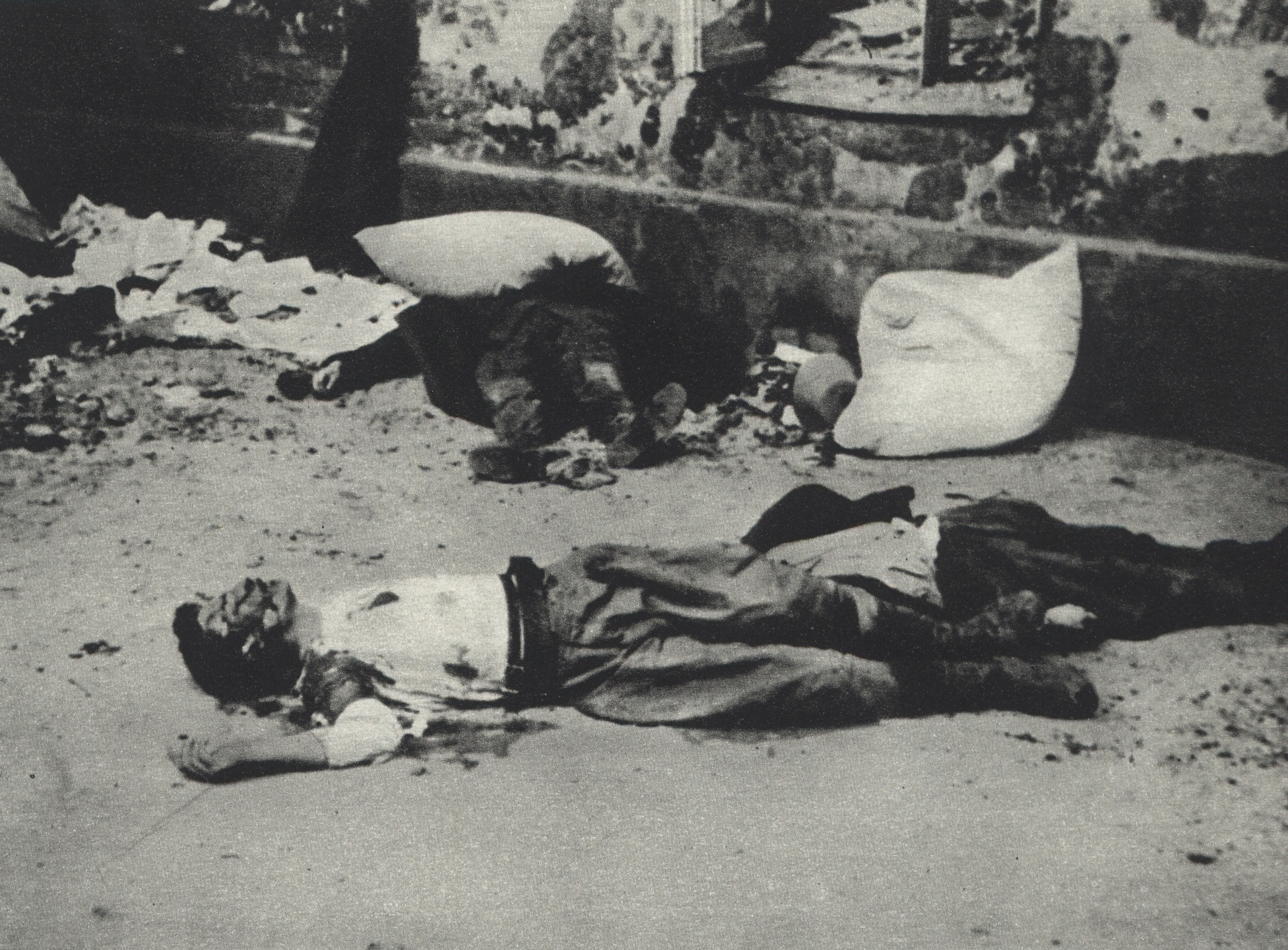
Murdered prisoners of war – September 1944

On 30 August 1944, the governments of the United States and United Kingdom agreed to officially recognize the Home Army as an integral part of the Polish Armed Forces, entitled to full combatant rights. On 3 September 1944, the Deutsche Nachrichtenbüro issued a statement announcing that Germany also recognized the combatant rights of Home Army soldiers.

On 2 September, German units captured Sadyba. German soldiers (mainly those belonging to the Luftwaffe's hastily assembled formations) murdered all wounded and captured insurgents, as well as many civilians – residents of Podhalańska, Klarysewska, Chochołowska, and other streets. Some of the victims were killed in executions, while the rest by grenades thrown into shelters and basements. Among those murdered were women and children.

On 4 September, the units of the Reinefarth Combat Group attacked Powiśle. After three days of fighting, the insurgents' resistance was broken. In the captured district, the Germans again proceeded to liquidate the insurgent hospitals. The wounded and some members of the staff from the hospitals at 3 Tamka Street and 8 Drewniana Street were murdered. Thanks to the actions of the doctors, however, it was possible to save the patients of the hospitals on Pieracki and Konopczyński streets. The Germans gathered the civilian population in the square at Browarna Street, then marched them through the Saxon Garden to Wola, and from there to the camp in Pruszków. This was accompanied by a series of rapes and looting. Young men suspected of participating in the uprising were murdered.

Soldiers from the Reinefarth Combat Group also committed a series of crimes during the fighting in Powiśle Czerniakowskie. In Czerniaków, as was the case in the Old Town and Powiśle, wounded and captured insurgents were routinely murdered. Several hundred wounded Home Army soldiers were shot or burned alive in insurgent hospitals captured by the Germans located in: the Social Insurance Institution building (about 60 victims) and the Citroën factory (about 40 victims) on Czerniakowska Street, the Primary School No. 29 at 9 Zagórna Street (several dozen victims), and in houses at 41 Solec Street (about 60 victims) and 5 Wilanowska Street (122 victims). Healthy prisoners of war and civilians were also murdered, mainly men suspected of participating in the uprising. Several hundred people were killed during mass executions carried out near the Port of Czerniaków (unknown number of victims), the Społem warehouses (about 100 victims), and on Wilanowska (140–200 victims) and Adam Idźkowski streets (several dozen victims).

After the fall of Czerniaków on 23 September, the Germans murdered between 120 and 200 captured Home Army soldiers. At the ultramarine factory near 53 Solec Street, 14 prisoners were hanged on transmission belts, including 5 nurses and Father Józef Stanek, chaplain of the Kryska Group. Another 30 insurgents were hanged near the Syrena sailing club jetty (in the ice rink hall). The rest of the prisoners were herded together with civilians to the Sipo headquarters on Szuch Avenue, where further executions took place.

On 14–15 September, after fierce fighting, the Germans managed to take control of most of Marymont. Units from the Wehrmacht's 25th Panzer Division committed a series of war crimes, systematically burning houses and carrying out executions, including in the square in front of the Marysieńka Palace, near the Marymont ponds, in the area of Gdańska Street, and in the municipal Water Works Management building on Potocka Street. According to the Polish Red Cross reports, at least 363 people were murdered in Marymont at that time, including 25 children aged between 3 months and 14 years. Adam Borkiewicz estimated the number of victims at over 500. The surviving population, amid rapes and looting, was herded into the Central Institute of Physical Education in Bielany and then transported to Pruszków. The wounded and captured insurgents also fell victim to the murders. In a house at 12 Rajszewska Street, the Germans used grenades and flamethrowers to murder 14 wounded members of the Żmija Group and three nurses who were caring for them. At the insurgent first-aid post at 4 Rudzka Street, they murdered 20 wounded and an unknown number of medical personnel.

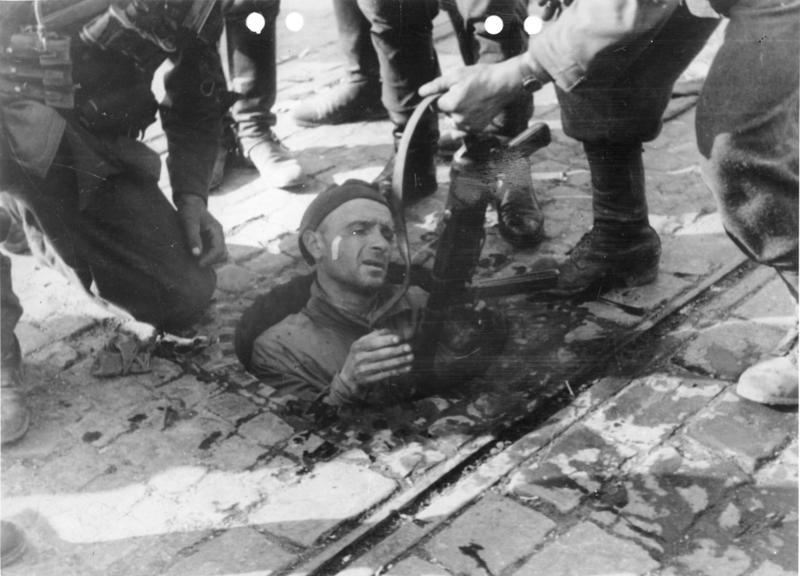
One of the insurgents captured near Dworkowa Street

On 24 September, German troops launched a general assault on insurgent Mokotów. After four days of fighting, the district fell. During the fighting, German soldiers murdered the wounded and medical personnel in the insurgent hospitals at 117/119 Independence Avenue and 17 Czeczota Street. The Germans brutally expelled residents from the captured quarters of the district, looting and setting fires. Over 70 men suspected of participating in the uprising were shot on Kazimierzowska Street. In addition, after the capitulation of Mokotów on September 27, the Germans murdered an unknown number of seriously wounded Poles lying in the basements of houses on Szustra Street, and set fire to the insurgent hospital at 91 Puławska Street, where over 20 people died.

On the evening of 26 September, on the orders of the commander of the Mokotów defense, Lieutenant Colonel Józef Rokicki, codenamed Daniel, units of the Home Army's 10th Infantry Division began evacuating through the sewers to Śródmieście. During the chaotic evacuation, some of the insurgents got lost in the sewers and, after several dozen hours of arduous marching, mistakenly exited through a manhole in German-occupied territory. 140 Home Army soldiers captured in this manner were shot near the Warsaw District military police headquarters on Dworkowa Street. Another 98 insurgents captured after leaving the sewers were murdered on Chocimska Street.

In addition, after the fall of Żoliborz on 30 September, the Germans, contrary to the terms of the capitulation agreement, murdered some of the most seriously wounded prisoners. Similar crimes also occurred sporadically after the final surrender of the uprising on 3 October.

== Attacks on civilian objects ==
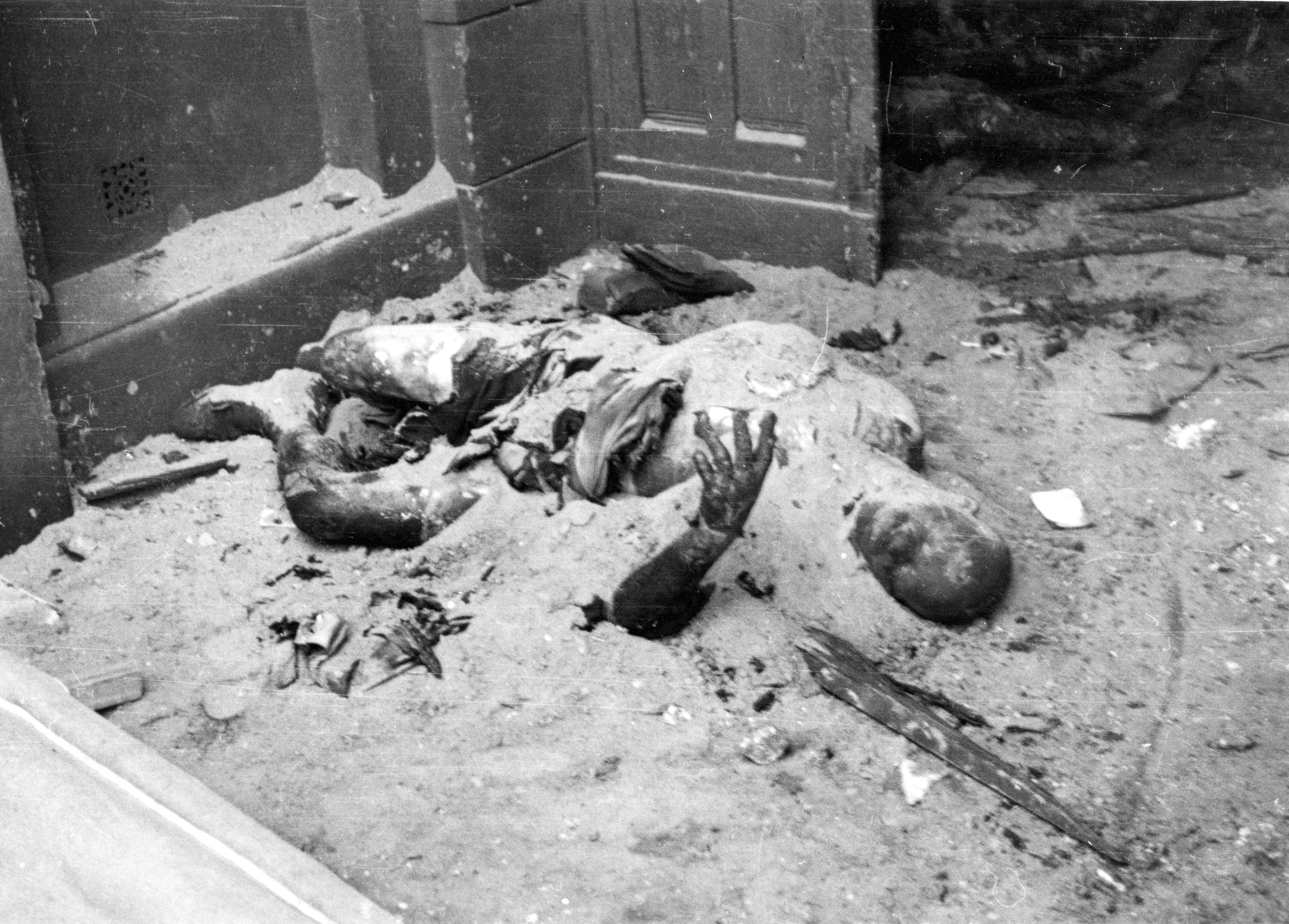
Victim of a Nebelwerfer

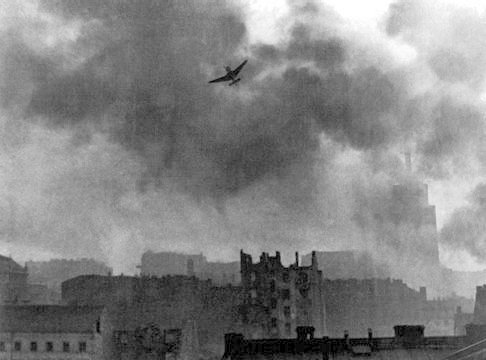
Air raid on the Old Town

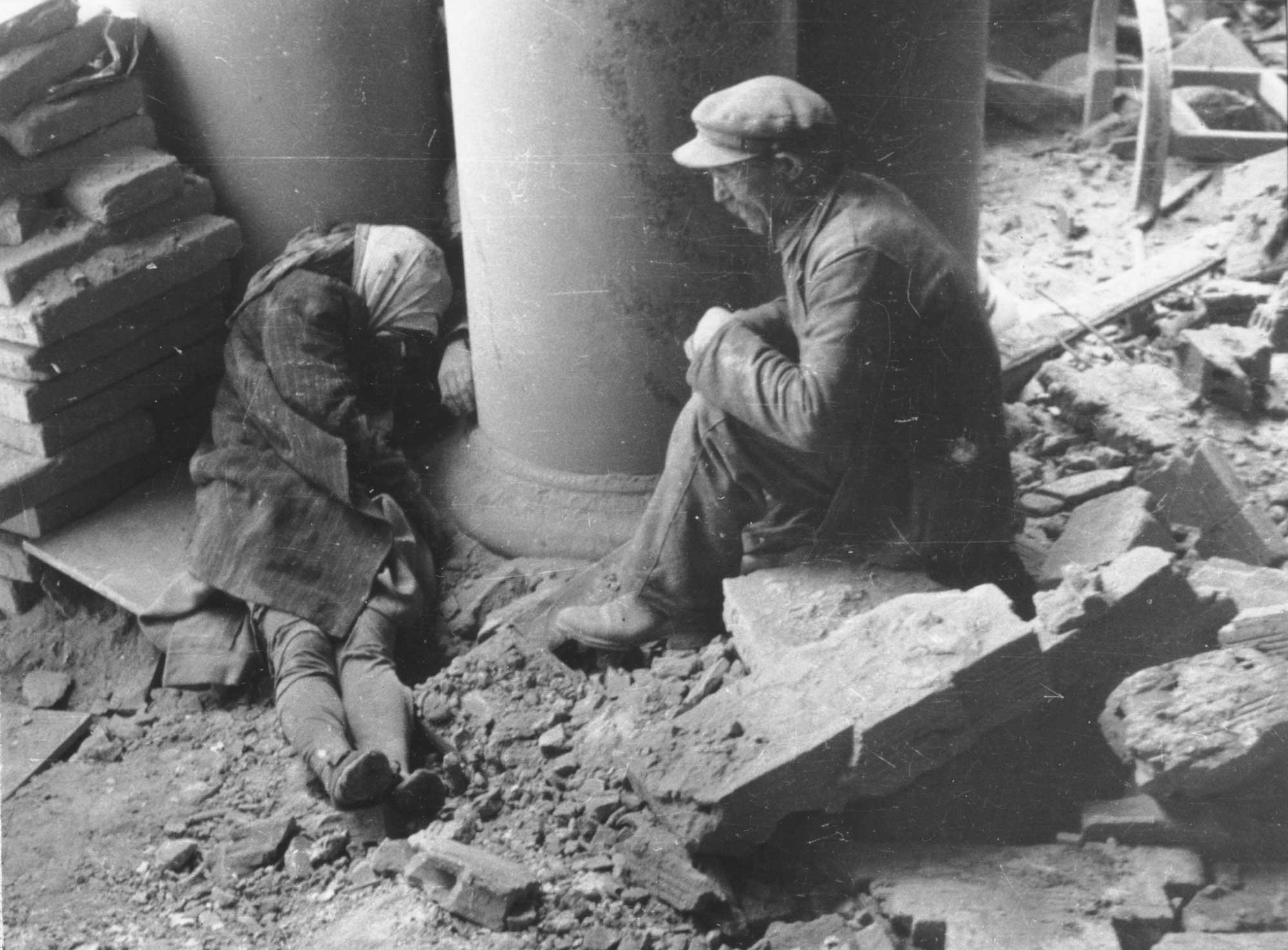
Victims of an air raid

During two months of fighting, German artillery and air forces indiscriminately attacked both civilian and military targets. As a result, the Polish civilian population suffered enormous losses as a result of air raids and artillery fire; until 10 September – when Soviet fighter planes appeared over the city – the German air force operated over Warsaw with virtually no consequences. As early as 7 August, the insurgent newspaper Rzeczpospolita Polska estimated that in Śródmieście alone, 500 people had been killed and 57 tenements had been destroyed as a result of German air raids. On 8 September, the Warsaw branch of the Polish Red Cross reported in a telegram to the International Red Cross headquarters in Geneva that "the losses among the civilian population dying from shelling or under the rubble can be estimated at thousands per day." The population of the Old Town (including many refugees from Wola sheltering there) suffered particularly heavy losses. During the battle for the Old Town, approximately 30,000–40,000 civilians were killed, and nearly two-thirds of them as a result of German air raids and artillery fire. On 1 September alone, over 2,000 people were killed in the bombed church of the Benedictine Nuns of Perpetual Adoration of the Blessed Sacrament, St. Hyacinth's Church, and St. Martin's Church.

German artillery and air forces routinely attacked Warsaw hospitals, even when they were clearly marked with Red Cross symbols. Some eyewitness accounts indicate that such markings actually intensified enemy fire.

- In August 1944, approximately 300 mentally ill patients, wounded civilians and insurgents, as well as nurses and doctors were killed as a result of German bombing and shelling of the Church of John of God on Bonifraterska Street. The hospital was clearly marked with Red Cross symbols.
- On 20 August, the German air force bombed the insurgent hospital at 13/15 Długa Street (the Field Cathedral of the Polish Army). Between 120 and 200 people were killed, including almost 60 members of staff. The hospital was clearly marked with Red Cross symbols.
- As a result of aerial bombardment and artillery fire, approximately 60 people (including 40 wounded) were killed in the hospital of the Sisters of Saint Elizabeth at Goszczyński Street (27–29 August). The hospital was clearly marked with Red Cross symbols.
- On 30 August, the German air force bombed the Ujazdów Hospital at 19 Chełmska Street, which was clearly marked with a Red Cross flag. Approximately 240–300 wounded and members of staff were killed.
- On 2 September, the German air force bombed the insurgent hospital at 3/5 Antoni Malczewski Street, killing about 100 people. German pilots then fired machine guns at people trying to dig out the victims buried during the air raid.
- On 6 September, approximately 80 wounded people burned alive in the insurgent hospital at 3/5 Pieracki Street, which was shelled with Nebelwerfer rockets.
- Approximately 100 people died under the rubble of the insurgent hospital at 4/6 Gabriel Piotr Boduen Street, which was bombed on 15 September.

== Human shields ==
During the Warsaw Uprising, German units repeatedly used Polish civilians (including women and children) as "human shields" to cover infantry or tank attacks. This tactic was first used in Warsaw by Wehrmacht troops, and only later by SS and police units. The order to take hostages from among the civilian population and use them to shield German attacks was given to Wehrmacht units by the commander of the Warsaw garrison, General Reiner Stahel. Most cases of civilians being used as "human shields" took place in the first days of the uprising, especially during the fighting in Wola.

- On 2 August, during fighting in the area of Okopowa Street in Wola, soldiers of the 1st Fallschirm-Panzer Division Hermann Göring used 50 Poles tied to a ladder as cover for advancing tanks. This was the first recorded case of the Germans using civilians as "human shields" during the uprising.
- In the early morning of 3 August, German tanks attacked the insurgent barricades on Wolska Street. A group of men and women were herded in front of the column to serve as cover for the vehicles and as labor to dismantle the barricades. The attack was stopped, and the insurgents managed to rescue some of the hostages. In the morning, a strong armored column belonging to the Hermann Göring division again attacked the insurgent barricades on Wolska Street. About 300 civilians (women and men) were herded in front of the tanks as a shield. The German column managed to break through the insurgent positions and then reach the vicinity of the Poniatowski Bridge via Towarowa Street and Jerusalem Avenue. It was only there that the surviving civilians were released from the "human shield."
- During the attempt to unblock Jerusalem Avenue on 3 August, Wehrmacht soldiers from the 4th East Prussian Panzergrenadier Regiment used several dozen civilians from Praga and houses on 3 Maja Avenue as human shields. During the fighting, the civilians from the "human shield" were caught in crossfire from both sides and were massacred. The Germans shot or threw grenades at hostages who fled or tried to hide from the bullets. Approximately 50–60 Polish civilians were killed at that time.
- On 4 August, during an attack on an insurgent redoubt in the Tobacco Monopoly building in Ochota, German police officers used a group of civilians as human shields. Many hostages were killed in the crossfire, while some managed to escape to areas controlled by the insurgents.
- On 5 August, Wehrmacht soldiers under General Stahel's command drove the Polish population from the vicinity of Krakowskie Przedmieście to the small square by the Nicolaus Copernicus Monument. There, some of the civilians (both women and men) were separated from the crowd and used as cover for two German armored columns attacking insurgent positions on New World Street and Świętokrzyska Street. The group covering the attack on the Polish barricade on Świętokrzyska Street was repelled by Home Army soldiers, but many hostages were killed in the process. The "human shield" from New World Street was withdrawn to the Saxon Garden and then used again as cover for the German attack on the insurgent positions on Królewska Street. During the fighting, most of the hostages managed to take refuge in areas controlled by the insurgents.
- On 5 August, in South Downtown, the German garrison of the "police district" attempted to relieve the crew of the so-called small PAST building (19 Pius XI Street). On the orders of SS-Oberführer Geibel, several hundred Polish women captured in the vicinity of Union of Lublin Square were used as a "human shields." Some of the women were placed on tanks to protect them from Molotov cocktails, while others walked in front of and on the sides of the column. The hostages were ordered (under threat of being shot) to wave white handkerchiefs and loudly call on the insurgents to cease fire. German policemen disguised in women's scarves and coats were mixed in with the crowd. A fierce battle took place on Pius XI Street, during which about 50 hostages were killed and many others were wounded. About 200 women managed to get to the area controlled by the Home Army units.
- On 7 August, during fighting near Chłodna and Elektoralna streets, SS men from Dirlewanger's regiment used Polish civilians as "human shields" to protect themselves from the insurgents' fire. On the same day, while advancing from Krakowskie Przedmieście towards Powiśle (along Karowa and Bednarska streets), Dirlewanger's men used wounded insurgents from the first-aid post on Furmańska Street as cover. Several wounded men were killed.
- On 8 August, SS men from Dirlewanger's regiment attacked insurgent positions on Bielańska Street and in the City Hall. The attack was carried out under cover of a crowd of women and children driven out of the National Opera. The attack collapsed under the insurgents' flanking fire, and most of the hostages managed to take refuge in the area controlled by the Poles, thanks to the help of Home Army soldiers. However, many women were killed during the exchange of fire. The Germans used the same tactics during the fighting on Senatorska Street.

The Germans' use of "human shields" did not break the spirit of the insurgent troops, who continued to put up fierce resistance, even though it caused inevitable losses among the hostages. In this situation, the German command (probably on the initiative of von dem Bach) abandoned this tactic around 12 August. However, front-line units were still willing to use civilians as "human shields." During the fighting for the Old Town, the Germans used Polish civilians as cover for attacking troops several more times – including during the attack on the Polish barricade on Leszno Street on 12 August, during the assault on St. John of God Hospital on 21 August, and during the fighting after the fall of the Polish Security Printing Works on 28 August. Sporadic cases of using civilians as "human shields" also occurred during the fighting in Powiśle, Upper Czerniaków, and Marymont.

In addition, German soldiers forced Polish civilians to work at the front line – dismantling insurgent barricades or building their own fortifications. They were also used to carry wounded and dead German soldiers and their abandoned weapons from the front line, as well as to transport supplies to advanced German posts. This practice was sanctioned by the German command, which, in one of its instructions to fighting units, recommended that "the supposedly non-combatant, innocent population should be ruthlessly forced to work on clearing the area, even under enemy fire."

== Rapes ==
From the very first days of the uprising, Polish women and girls were raped in Warsaw. The scale of this phenomenon is very difficult to estimate, although a number of testimonies given before the Chief Commission for the Prosecution of Crimes against the Polish Nation, as well as the recollections of witnesses to these events, indicate that rape was a common occurrence during the suppression of the uprising. They most often occurred during the expulsion of people from their homes or at assembly points for civilians located within the city, such as the Zieleniak market in Ochota or the Church of St. Stanislaus (commonly known at the time as the Church of St. Adalbert) in Wola. Not only civilians were assaulted, but also female insurgent medics and even hospital patients. After being raped, the victims were often murdered and mutilated in an obscene manner.

The testimonies and recollections of participants in the uprising quite unanimously emphasize that rapes were most often committed by soldiers from collaborationist units formed from citizens of the Soviet Union. (Note: The residents of Warsaw collectively referred to the collaborators from eastern volunteer formations who were pacifying the city as "Ukrainians" or "Kalmyks," and these terms appear most frequently in memoirs. This was largely due to the impression made throughout Poland by reports of crimes committed in Kresy by Ukrainian nationalists. In reality, the compact Ukrainian units did not play a major role in the uprising (Ludność cywilna (1974, pp. 46–47, vol. II)).) A series of brutal rapes were committed by soldiers of the RONA brigade pacifying Ochota – especially in the transit camp at Zieleniak. Other collaborationist units fighting in other districts of Warsaw did not behave much better in this respect. Rapes committed by Russian-speaking collaborators was generally tolerated by the German officers commanding them.

However, a number of witness testimonies indicate that units composed of Germans also committed numerous rapes of women. This applies in particular to Dirlewanger's regiment, which was known for its low level of discipline. "Every time we stormed a basement and there were women in it, Dirlewanger's men raped them," recalled Wehrmacht veteran Mathias Schenk in an interview with Polish journalists. Christian Ingrao put forward the thesis that Dirlewanger's soldiers' propensity for mass rape of women – especially those with emblematic status (nurses, nuns, etc.) – stemmed from the fact that the leadership of the Third Reich perceived the Warsaw Uprising as the final act in an almost thousand-year rivalry between the Polish and German elements. In this context, rape was seen as a blow to the cultural and ethnic identity of the Polish nation, which the Germans considered to be most strongly embodied by Polish women.

== Expulsion of Warsaw population ==
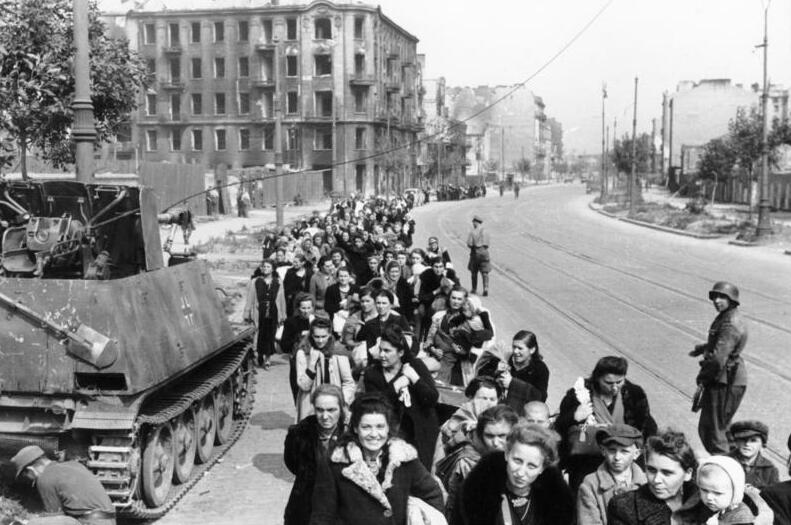
Expelled population of Wola

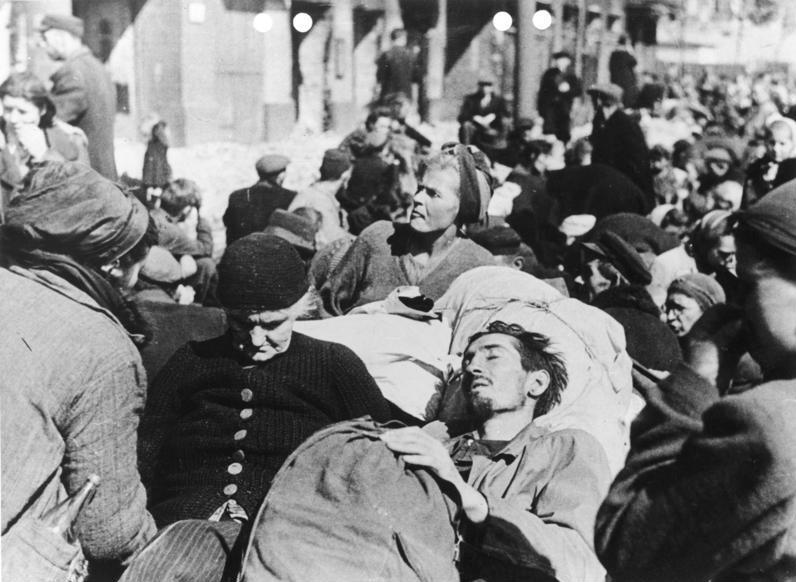
"Evacuation" of civilians after the capitulation of the uprising

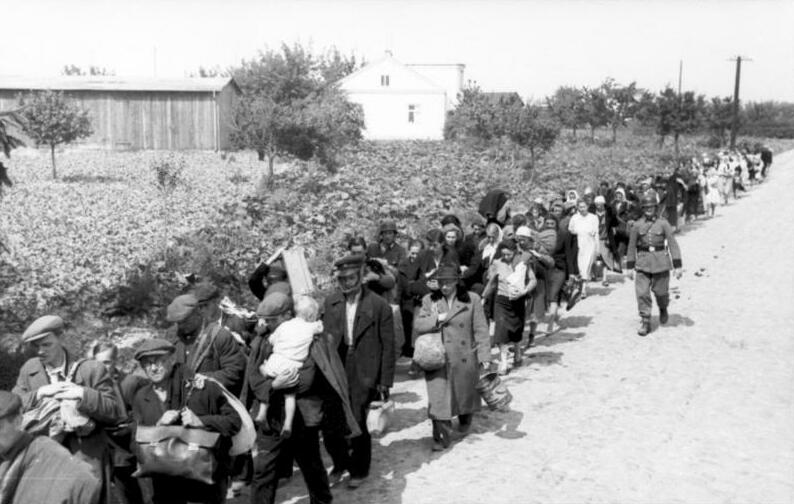
Deportees on the road to Pruszków

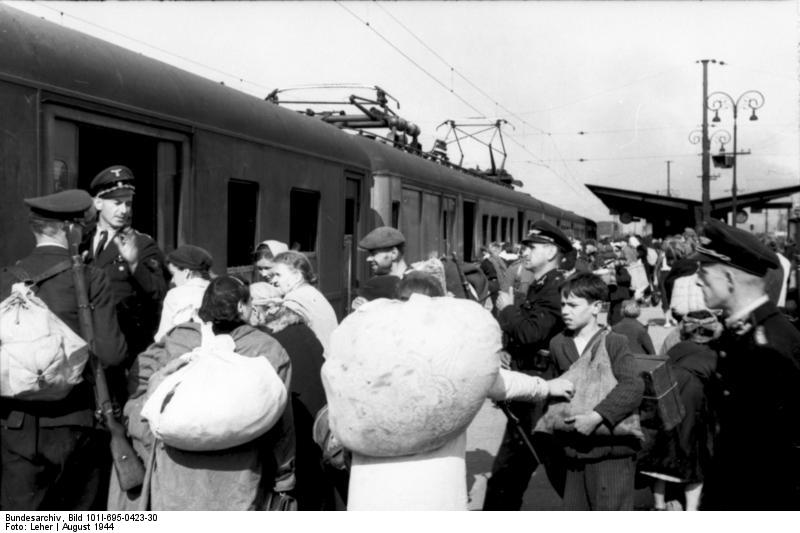
Deportation of Warsaw residents from Warszawa Zachodnia station to the camp in Pruszków

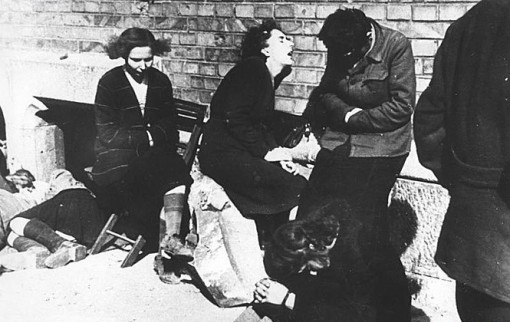
Women from Wola in the Pruszków camp

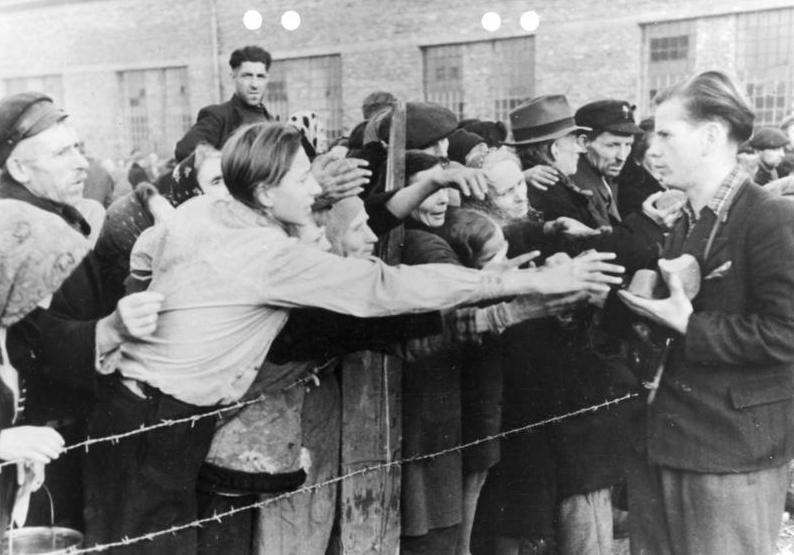
Pruszków – distribution of food by Polish Red Cross workers

Starting on 6 August, Polish women and children were sent, in accordance with von dem Bach's orders, to a transit camp set up in Pruszków near Warsaw. Contrary to official assurances that the purpose of the displacement was to remove civilians from the front line, the Germans were only interested in using the captured Warsaw residents as slave labor and looting and destroying the city itself. As early as 7 August, the first transport of displaced Warsaw residents arrived at the camp in Pruszków. They were mainly survivors of the massacre in Wola, who were first gathered in the Church of St. Adalbert and then sent on foot to Pruszków. From 12 August, men were also sent to the camp. In general, the displacement of Warsaw's inhabitants took place in stages and depended on the situation on the insurgent fronts. The final phase of the displacement took place after the capitulation of the uprising. In accordance with the provisions of the "Agreement on the Cessation of Hostilities in Warsaw," most civilians left the city in the first ten days of October 1944. From 25 October, an order prohibiting civilians from staying in Warsaw came into force.

When fighting on the central section of the eastern front temporarily ceased, the Germans began systematically deporting people from districts of right-bank Praga that were not affected by the uprising, starting with Gocławek and Grochów. Initially, this included men aged 16 to 60, and in the final stage, it also included women up to 45 years of age who did not have small children. In addition, the population of the immediate vicinity of Warsaw was also subject to displacement: Łomianki, Młociny, Bemowo, Wawrzyszew, Włochy, Stare Babice, and Jelonki. This was part of the German plan to thin out the Polish population within a 35-kilometer radius of Warsaw.

During the uprising, the displacement of Warsaw's residents usually followed a similar pattern. In the districts they had occupied, the Germans and their Eastern collaborators drove people out of shelters or residential buildings, usually accompanied by beatings, shouting, and looting of all valuable personal belongings. Residents were given no more than a few minutes to leave the building, allowing them to take only enough luggage that would not hinder their march to the camp in Pruszków. Those who resisted, delayed the march (due to their age and health), or simply offended the escort soldiers in some way were killed on the spot. The captured civilians were initially sent to makeshift transit camps and assembly points within the city. The most famous of these were the Church of St. Adalbert in Wola and the Zieleniak market in Ochota, through which 90,000 and 60,000 people passed during the uprising, respectively. Other assembly points for the expelled residents of the capital were located, among others, in the Stauferkaserne barracks on Rakowiecka Street and the Flakkaserne on Puławska Street, as well as within the horse racing track in Służewiec in Mokotów, the Central Institute of Physical Education in Bielany, the Sipo headquarters on Szuch Avenue, the University of Warsaw complex on Krakowskie Przedmieście, the National Museum in Śródmieście, the vicinity of Moczydło between Natolin and Pyry, at a "sawmill/joinery" in Okęcie and the barracks at 11 Listopada Street in Praga.

A transit camp for the expelled population of Warsaw (Durchgangslager 121) was organized on the premises of the disused Railway Rolling Stock Repair Works in Pruszków, which in 1939 housed a camp for Polish prisoners of war, and from January 1941 (for a certain period of time) – a labor camp for Jews. As a result, in 1944, elements of the security infrastructure (bunkers, watchtowers) still existed on the premises of the plant, which could be adapted for the needs of the new camp. The site was also chosen because of its favorable location – a short distance from the capital and conveniently situated on the railway from Warsaw to Skierniewice, which enabled efficient "unloading" of the camp.

At any given time, there were usually between 5,000 and 40,000 people in the camp. At the end of August and in September, several dozen passenger trains (3–6 wagons) and freight trains arrived in Pruszków daily. The camp became extremely overcrowded after the fall of the Old Town, when it held around 75,000 displaced people. However, the largest number of refugees arrived there after the capitulation of the uprising. At that time, nearly 150,000 people passed through Dulag 121. It is difficult to estimate how many residents of Warsaw and its surroundings ended up in the Pruszków camp. Danuta Leśniewska, a Polish interpreter working in the camp, estimated, based on her own observations and German statistics, that between 390,000 and 410,000 Warsaw residents passed through Dulag 121. In order to at least partially relieve the main camp in Pruszków, the Germans were forced to temporarily create several subcamps. They were organized in: Ursus (on the premises of a metalworks), Piastów (in a rubber factory), Ożarów Mazowiecki (in a glassworks), and Włochy (in the Era factory), and were subordinate to the commandant's office in Pruszków. A total of 38 temporary camps were identified, to which Warsaw residents expelled after the uprising were sent. (Note: These were located, among other places, in Groty near Babice, Jelonki, Laski, Łomianki, Niepokalanów, Pomiechówek, Rembertów (liberated 12 September), Skierniewice, Zakroczym, and Żabieniec, which were situated close to the capital. The exiles were also placed in camps established at a considerable distance from Warsaw — in Brzeg, Działdowo, Głogów, Legnica, Łambinowice, Namysłów, Oleśnica, Opole, Piła, Prądnik Biały, Stargard, Szczakowa, and Sołtysowice (Exodus Warszawy (1992, vol. I)).)

The displaced people who arrived in Pruszków were housed in nine huge production halls. The conditions there were very harsh. The halls were stuffy and extremely crowded, and each of them had inspection ditches filled with rotting waste and vermin. There were no beds, so the prisoners had to sleep on concrete floors covered with mud and waste, and in the locomotive shed also with grease and slag. Although the nights were getting colder every day, the halls were unheated. Due to the lack of basic sanitary facilities, it was impossible to even wash one's hands, let alone maintain cleanliness. The few taps provided industrial water that was unfit for drinking. Due to the small number of latrines, the population had to relieve themselves in inspection ditches. Up to 480 workers were employed in the camp kitchen, but even when there was no shortage of food, the kitchen staff could not keep up with its distribution because there were not enough plates and spoons. There was a lack of medicine and sanitary facilities. As a result, there was hunger in the camp and people suffered from dysentery on a massive scale. In Dulag 121, unlike other German camps, Polish sanitary and kitchen staff from outside were allowed to work. In addition, with the consent of the Germans, the Central Welfare Council and the Polish Red Cross took care of the population, which helped to alleviate the difficult situation of the prisoners to some extent. Polish personnel (most of whom had been sent to the camp by the Polish Underground State) tried to protect the population from being sent to concentration camps or forced labor camps. However, they had no influence on the overall situation in the camp, especially on the selections carried out by the Germans, during which people were chosen to be transported deep into the Reich or to concentration camps. During these brutal and cursory selections, the rule of not separating families was not respected. At Dulag 121, there were cases (especially in the early days of its operation) of young men suspected of participating in the uprising being murdered. Summary executions were also carried out in cases of attempted escape from the camp or transport. Several hundred to several thousand prisoners of Dulag 121 died from disease, exhaustion, or at the hands of guards. However, over 30,000 people managed to leave the camp, mainly thanks to the help of Polish medical personnel employed there. In addition, as part of the so-called Raków Operation, railway workers of the Warsaw Commuter Railway enabled almost a 1,000 people to escape from transport.

During and after the uprising, the Germans expelled a total of approximately 550,000 residents of Warsaw and 100,000 people from towns near Warsaw. Of this group, at least 520,000 people fell into German hands and passed through transit camps near Warsaw. Almost 60,000 people, including at least 17,882 women and children, were sent by the Germans to concentration camps. (Note: According to the calculations of Dunin-Wąsowicz (1984, p. 355), women and children were sent to: Ravensbrück – 12,000; Auschwitz – 5,200; Stutthof – 680. Men were directed to: Mauthausen-Gusen – 8,800; Auschwitz – 7,900; Buchenwald – 4,560; Stutthof – 3,500 (including two transports from Praga on 25 and 31 August); Dachau – 3,040; Sachsenhausen – 3,000; Gross-Rosen – 3,000; Flossenbürg – 2,500.) Another 90,000 expellees were sent to forced labor.

Approximately 300,000–350,000 people unable to work – pregnant women, mothers with children under the age of fifteen, men over the age of sixty, women over the age of fifty, injured, sick or disabled people – were transported throughout the General Government and left there without any means of subsistence. The number of people who were released or removed from transit camps under various pretexts, or who managed to escape from transports or leave the city on their own, is estimated at 100,000. In addition, about 400–1,500 people (the so-called Robinson Crusoes of Warsaw) hid in the ruins of Warsaw, where in many cases they remained until the liberation of the capital in January 1945.

== Destruction of Warsaw ==
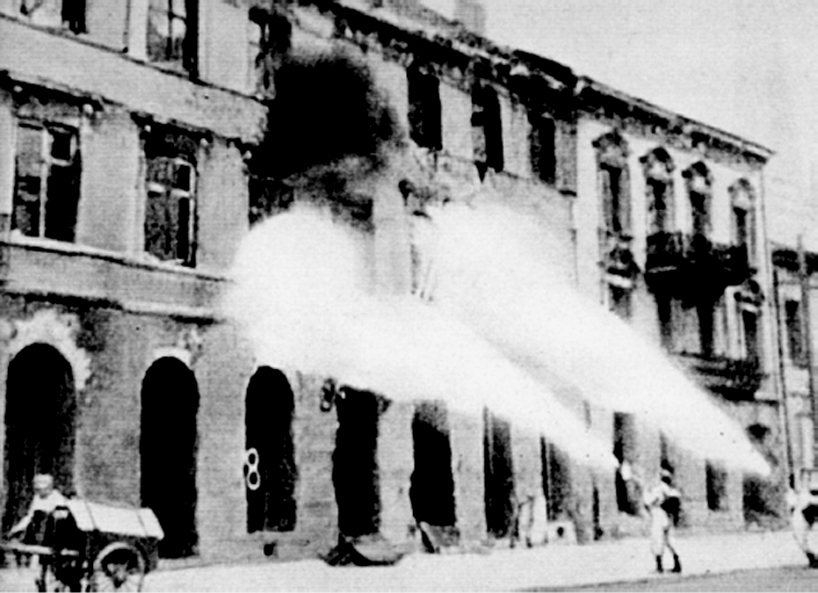
Brandkommando in action

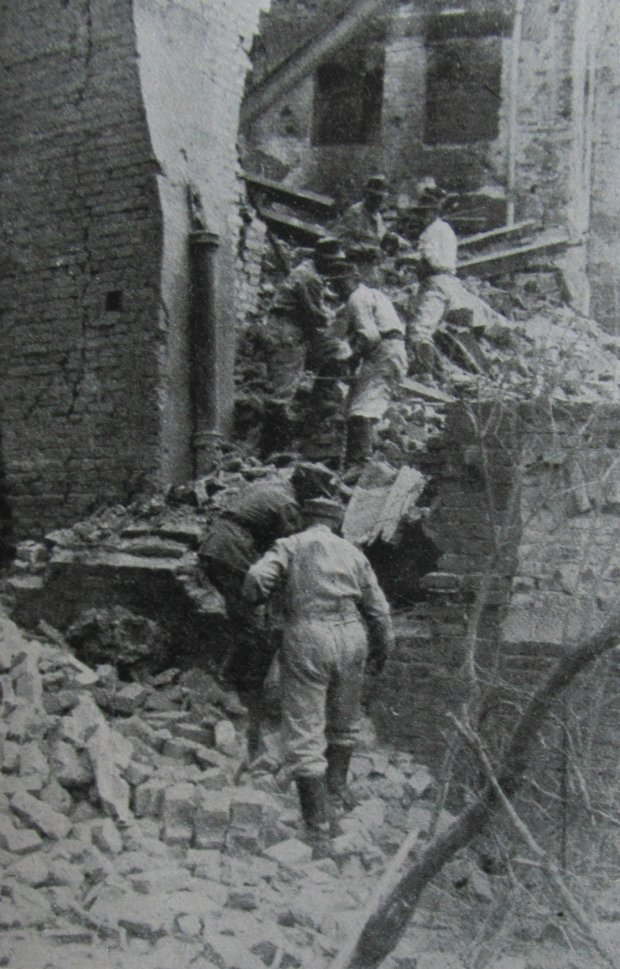
Preparations for the demolition of the Royal Castle in Warsaw, 8 September 1944

Two months of fierce fighting caused enormous material damage to Warsaw. Approximately 25% of the pre-war buildings on the left bank of Warsaw were destroyed. The Old Town was almost completely demolished, and the districts of Wola, Powiśle, Czerniaków, and North Downtown also suffered severe damage. Next on the list of losses were South Downtown, Mokotów, Żoliborz, and Ochota. At the beginning of September 1944, the Germans also caused a great deal of destruction in Praga, where, retreating under pressure from the Red Army, they blew up all the bridges over the Vistula and burned or blew up the railway stations on the right bank. The destruction during the uprising was caused not only by artillery fire and air raids, but also by deliberate arson and explosions carried out by German troops, who treated the burning of entire neighborhoods as a legitimate method of warfare. Among other things, in the first days of the uprising, the Germans deliberately burned down Mariensztat, as well as a whole row of houses in Wola and on Jerusalem Avenue. Many of these deliberate acts of destruction could not be justified by the necessities of war, especially the demolition of Sigismund's Column on 2 September, the destruction of the Tomb of the Unknown Soldier by German tanks on 4 September, and the blowing up of the ruins of the Royal Castle in mid-September.

After the capitulation of the uprising, the Germans undertook to spare the public and private property remaining in the city, with particular emphasis on objects of great historical, cultural, or religious value. However, there was no intention of complying with the terms of the surrender agreement. As early as 9 October, a conference was held at Himmler's field headquarters in East Prussia to discuss the future of Warsaw. Acting on Hitler's authority, the Reichsführer-SS issued an order to completely destroy the city, after first emptying it of all materials of value to the Reich. According to the account of SS-Oberführer Geibel, Himmler's order was: "This city is to disappear completely from the face of the earth and serve only as a transshipment point for Wehrmacht transport. Not a stone should remain standing. All buildings are to be demolished down to their foundations. Only technical equipment and railway buildings will remain."

The planned destruction of the city lasted about three and a half months and was only interrupted by the Soviet offensive in January 1945. The Germans developed a very precise method of destruction and looting. After emptying residential houses, industrial plants, and public buildings of everything that the destroyers considered to be of any value, arsonists from the so-called Brandkommando set to work. They systematically set fire to house after house, quarter after quarter. After a day or two, they checked the results and if the fire had gone out, they reignited it. The Brandkommando was followed by the so-called Sprengkommando, which blew up selected buildings. In addition to residential buildings, all the facilities necessary for the functioning of the city were also destroyed: the power station in Powiśle, the Water Filtration Station, the River Pumping Station, the gasworks, and the Tram Power Station. The Warsaw Cross-City Line was blocked by completely destroying the Warszawa Główna railway station and the Postal Station and seriously damaging the cross-city tunnel. The civil airport in Okęcie was ruined, and the rolling stock of the city's public transport (trams and buses) was destroyed or taken to Germany. Tanks were used to tear up telegraph wires and tram tracks. Destruction units, composed mainly of members of the Technische Nothilfe (police sapper units), operated mostly in the districts of Wola, North Downtown, and Żoliborz. The destruction of Warsaw was documented by Alfred Mensebach's special group and film crews.

The Germans were particularly passionate about destroying Polish monuments and objects of great cultural and spiritual value – palaces, churches, monuments, museums, archives, and libraries. The Central Archives of Historical Records, the Archives of Old Records, the Archives of Modern Records, the City Archives, the Treasury Archives, and the Archives of the Warsaw Metropolitan Curia were burned down, along with most of the collections they contained. The Krasiński Library, the Warsaw Public Library, and the Main Library of the Warsaw University of Technology were also destroyed. The Brühl Palace and the Saxon Palace were blown up. The Germans also burned down the Palace on the Isle, which they were unable to blow up. However, they demolished the St. John's Archcathedral along with the adjacent Jesuit Church, part of Hotel Europejski, and burned down the Church of St. Anthony of Padua on Senatorska Street, the Church of the Holy Spirit in New Town, St. Martin's Church on Piwna Street, St. Alexander's Church on Three Crosses Square, and St. Barbara Chappel on Nowogrodzka Street. The Church of the Holiest Saviour was seriously damaged as a result of being partially blown up. 22 of Warsaw's 31 monuments were scrapped or blown up (including the monuments of Bogusławski, Adam Mickiewicz, the Aviator, and the Sapper). A number of historic buildings were prepared for demolition (including the Belweder, the Copper-Roof Palace, the ruins of the National Opera, and the churches of the Bernardines, Carmelites, and Sisters of the Visitation on Krakowskie Przedmieście), but this was prevented by the Soviet offensive in January.

As a result of the planned destruction of the city, approximately 30% of the pre-war buildings on the left bank of Warsaw were destroyed, which is 5% more than was destroyed during the two months of the uprising. When this destruction is added to the losses from the siege of the city in September 1939, the liquidation of the Warsaw Ghetto, Soviet air raids, and uprising fighting, it turns out that 84% of the buildings on the left bank of Warsaw were destroyed during World War II. For the entire city, including Praga, this estimate was approximately 65%. Hundreds of priceless monuments and objects of great cultural and spiritual value were destroyed. The register of destroyed sacred and secular buildings of historical value in Warsaw contains 674 items. When retreating from Warsaw, the Germans left thousands of booby traps in ruins.

=== Looting ===
One element of the destruction of Warsaw was the mass looting of private and public property by the Germans both during and after the uprising. This was made easier by the fact that the population expelled from the city was only allowed to take with them enough luggage that would not hinder their march to the camp in Pruszków. The looting was carried out by the Germans in an organized way. After 22 October 1944, the so-called Räumungsstab (Evacuation Staff) was established, headed by SS-Oberführer Geibel (at the time directly subordinate to Himmler), who supervised the activities of the evacuation staffs of the police and civil authorities and was given priority in seizing property left in the city. Under his supervision, abandoned apartments and public buildings were systematically emptied of all valuable items and materials (industrial equipment, raw materials, works of art, foreign currency, valuables, textiles, furniture, etc.). At the very end, even street lamps and telephone cables were torn out of the ground to obtain raw materials. The services of the Minister of Armaments, Albert Speer, and the apparatus subordinate to the Gauleiter of the Wartheland, Arthur Greiser, also took part in the plundering of the Polish capital.

The scale of the looting was enormous. According to the calculations of Czesław Madajczyk, between mid-August and mid-December 1944, 26,319 wagons filled with industrial products, raw materials, and equipment were transported from Warsaw, along with 3,240 wagons of agricultural products and 850 trucks of looted property. Marian Chlewski, on the other hand, estimated that the Germans used 1,000 trains with 45,000 wagons to transport the goods looted in Warsaw. Chlewski's estimates may be indirectly confirmed by Wehrmacht documents stating that between August 11 and September 15 alone, 23,300 wagons filled with "evacuation goods" were transported from Warsaw. The same source also emphasizes that it is impossible to calculate "the amount of goods evacuated by motor convoys and empty return trains."

The highest Nazi leaders also personally benefited from the looting carried out in Warsaw. Preserved documents indicate that, among other things, musical instruments found in Warsaw were sent to Himmler's wife, and stamp collections were sent to him. There were even conflicts between the governor of the Warsaw District, Ludwig Fischer, and Gauleiter Greiser over who had priority in seizing property left behind in the city. Higher-ranking officers (including Dirlewanger and Kaminski), officials, and ordinary soldiers also engaged in looting on their own initiative. Abandoned apartments were looted so often that the commander of the Warsaw garrison, General Reiner Stahel, was forced to officially sanction the looting by allowing soldiers to take everything from the houses where the fire had started. Furthermore, as indicated by witness testimonies and memoirs, displaced residents of Warsaw were usually deprived of all valuable personal belongings by soldiers. Individual looting was facilitated by the fact that the luggage of officers, soldiers, and officials leaving the city was only checked for possible possession of gold or valuables.

== Criminal accountability of the perpetrators ==
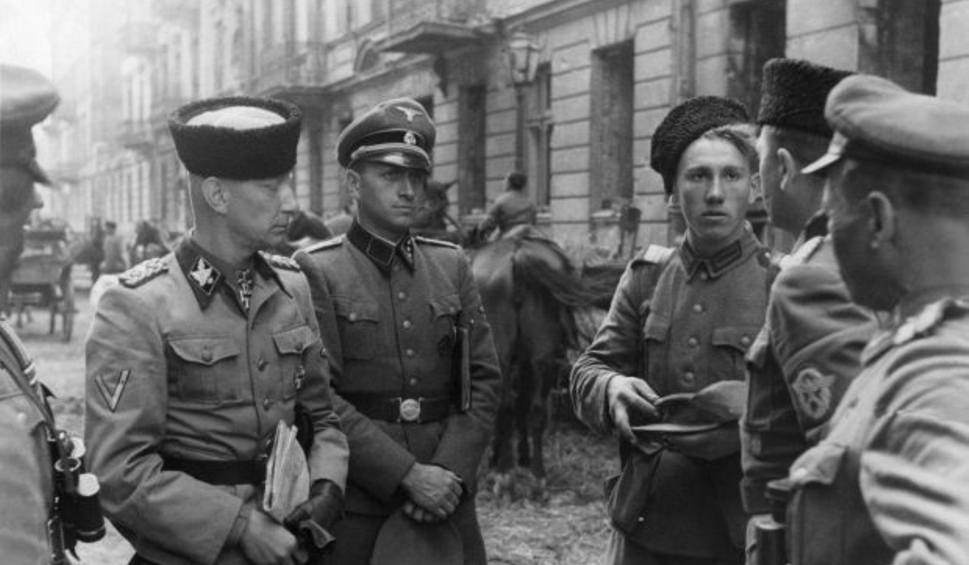
SS-Gruppenführer Heinz Reinefarth and soldiers of the 3rd Cossack Regiment of Jakub Bondarenko

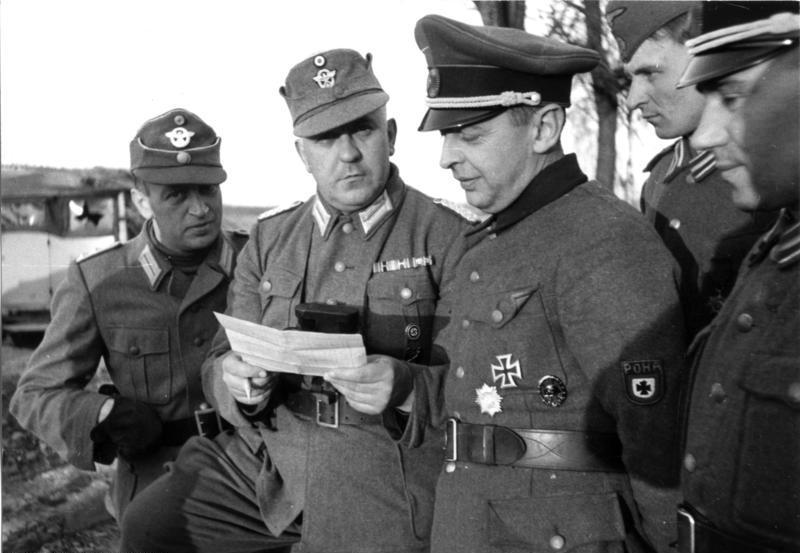
Bronislav Kaminski surrounded by German police officers

Only a few perpetrators of crimes committed during the suppression of the Warsaw Uprising were tried for their actions after the war ended. Charged with treason, Major Ivan Frolov was sentenced to death by firing squad by a court in Moscow in December 1945. General Reiner Stahel, commander of the Warsaw garrison, died in the Soviet Voikovo prison camp in 1955. Paul Otto Geibel, the SS and Police Leader for the Warsaw District, was sentenced in 1954 by the Provincial Court of the Capital City of Warsaw to life imprisonment (in 1966, he committed suicide in the Mokotów prison). Ludwig Hahn was sentenced to life imprisonment by a court in Hamburg in 1975, but the indictment did not include crimes committed by him during the suppression of the Warsaw Uprising. Hahn was released in 1983 and died three years later. In 1980, a court in Cologne found SS-Obersturmführer Martin Patz, commander of the 3rd Reserve SS Panzergrenadier Battalion, guilty of murdering 600 prisoners of the Mokotów prison and sentenced him to 9 years' imprisonment. Karl Misling, who was tried in the same trial, received a sentence of 4 years in prison.

A few months after the end of the war, Erich von dem Bach was arrested by the Americans. During the Nuremberg trials, he made a series of incriminating statements against Nazi leaders, as a result of which the United States later refused to extradite him to Poland. At the turn of 1946 and 1947, he appeared only briefly in Warsaw to testify at the trial of Ludwig Fischer, who was sentenced to death by the Supreme National Court in Warsaw for crimes committed against the population of the capital between 1939 and 1945.

Some of those responsible for the destruction of Warsaw died during the war or shortly after its end. The commander of the RONA brigade, SS-Brigadeführer Bronislav Kaminski, was shot by the Germans in October 1944 for insubordination and arbitrary looting in Warsaw. To avoid unrest among Kaminski's subordinates, his death was staged as a car accident. SS-Hauptsturmführer Alfred Spilker likely died during the defense of the Poznań citadel in February 1945. SS-Oberführer Oskar Dirlewanger died in unexplained circumstances in Altshausen in Baden-Württemberg, after being arrested in the French occupation zone on 1 June 1945. One version of events claims that he was recognized by former Polish prisoners of war and beaten to death.

However, many perpetrators of crimes committed during the Warsaw Uprising did not face any punishment. SS-Gruppenführer Heinz Reinefarth was not extradited to Poland because the American occupation authorities did not give their consent. In 1951, he was elected mayor of Westerland on the island of Sylt, and then served in the state parliament of Schleswig-Holstein. After ending his political career, he began working as a lawyer, while receiving a general's pension. He died in 1979 – he was never tried for the crimes committed in Warsaw. The American authorities also did not consent to the extradition of General Heinz Guderian to Poland. Major Kurt Fisher, who commanded the SS units that murdered the last defenders of Czerniaków, was the chief of police in Kassel after the war.

== Bibliography ==
- Bartelski, Lesław M. (1986). Mokotów 1944 (in Polish). Warsaw: MON. ISBN 83-11-07078-4.
- Bartoszewski, Władysław (2008). Dni walczącej stolicy. Kronika powstania warszawskiego [Days of the Fighting Capital: Chronicle of the Warsaw Uprising] (in Polish). Warsaw: Świat Książki. ISBN 978-83-247-1202-1.
- Bartoszewski, Władysław (1970). Warszawski pierścień śmierci 1939–1944 [Warsaw's Ring of Death 1939–1944] (in Polish). Warsaw: Interpress.
- Borkiewicz, Adam (1969). Powstanie warszawskie. Zarys działań natury wojskowej [The Warsaw Uprising: An Outline of Military Operations] (in Polish). Warsaw: Pax.
- Datner, Szymon; Leszczyński, Kazimierz, eds. (1962). Zbrodnie okupanta w czasie powstania warszawskiego w 1944 roku (w dokumentach) [Crimes of the Occupier During the Warsaw Uprising of 1944 (in Documents)] (in Polish). Warsaw: MON.
- Datner, Szymon (1960). "Zburzenie Warszawy" [The Destruction of Warsaw]. Straty wojenne Polski w latach 1939–1945 [Poland's War Losses 1939–1945] (in Polish). Poznań, Warsaw: Wydawnictwo Zachodnie.
- Davies, Norman (2006). Rising '44. The Battle for Warsaw. Kraków: Znak. ISBN 978-83-240-1386-9.
- Dunin-Wąsowicz, Krzysztof (1984). Warszawa w latach 1939–1945 [Warsaw in the Years 1939–1945] (in Polish). Warsaw: National Scientific Publishers PWN. ISBN 83-01-04207-9.
- Getter, Marek (August–September 2004). "Straty ludzkie i materialne w Powstaniu Warszawskim" [Human and Material Losses in the Warsaw Uprising]. Biuletyn IPN (in Polish). 8–9 (43–44).
- Grigo, Tadeusz (1989). Powiśle Czerniakowskie (in Polish). Warsaw: MON. ISBN 83-11-07667-7.
- Hanson, Joanna K. M. (2004). Nadludzkiej poddani próbie. Ludność cywilna Warszawy w powstaniu 1944 r. [Subjected to More Than Human Trial: The Civilian Population of Warsaw in the 1944 Uprising] (in Polish). Warsaw: Czytelnik. ISBN 83-07-02987-2.
- Kirchmayer, Jerzy (1984). Powstanie Warszawskie [The Warsaw Uprising] (in Polish). Warsaw: Książka i Wiedza. ISBN 83-05-11-080-X.
- Kopf, Stanisław (2001). Wyrok na miasto. Warszawskie Termopile 1944–1945 [Sentence on a City: Warsaw's Thermopylae 1944–1945] (in Polish). Warsaw: Askon. ISBN 83-87545-54-6.
- Kunert, Andrzej Krzysztof (2004). Kronika powstania warszawskiego [Chronicle of the Warsaw Uprising] (in Polish). Warsaw: Edipresse Polska; Zysk i Ska. ISBN 83-7298-662-2.
- Motyl, Maja; Rutkowski, Stanisław (1994). Powstanie Warszawskie – rejestr miejsc i faktów zbrodni [The Warsaw Uprising – Register of Sites and Facts of Crimes] (in Polish). Warsaw: Chief Commission for the Prosecution of Crimes against the Polish Nation.
- Przygoński, Antoni (1980). Powstanie warszawskie w sierpniu 1944 r. [The Warsaw Uprising in August 1944] (in Polish). Vol. I–II. Warsaw: National Scientific Publishers PWN. ISBN 83-01-00293-X.
- Sawicki, Jerzy (1949). Zburzenie Warszawy. Zeznania generałów niemieckich przed polskim prokuratorem członkiem polskiej delegacji przy Międzynarodowym Trybunale Wojennym w Norymberdze [The Destruction of Warsaw: Testimonies of German Generals Before the Polish Prosecutor, Member of the Polish Delegation to the International Military Tribunal in Nuremberg] (in Polish). Warsaw: Kolumna.
- Sawicki, Tadeusz (2010). Rozkaz zdławić powstanie. Niemcy i ich sojusznicy w walce z powstaniem warszawskim [Order to Crush the Uprising: Germany and Its Allies in the Fight Against the Warsaw Uprising] (in Polish). Warsaw: Bellona. ISBN 978-83-11-11892-8.
- Ujazdowska, Lidia (2005). Zagłada Ochoty [The Annihilation of Ochota] (in Polish). Warsaw: Fronda. ISBN 83-922344-1-3.
- Zaborski, Zdzisław (2010). Durchgangslager 121. Niemiecka zbrodnia specjalna [Durchgangslager 121: A Special German Crime] (in Polish). Pruszków: County and Municipal Public Library in Pruszków. ISBN 978-83-62144-04-4.
- Zaborski, Zdzisław (2004). Tędy przeszła Warszawa. Epilog Powstania Warszawskiego [Warsaw Passed This Way: Epilogue to the Warsaw Uprising] (in Polish). Warsaw: ASKON. ISBN 83-87545-86-4.
- Exodus Warszawy. Ludzie i miasto po Powstaniu 1944 [The Exodus of Warsaw: People and City After the 1944 Uprising] (in Polish). Vol. I–II. Warsaw: State Publishing Institute PIW. 1992. ISBN 83-06-01589-4.
- Ludność cywilna w powstaniu warszawskim [Civilian Population in the Warsaw Uprising] (in Polish). Vol. I–II. Warsaw: State Publishing Institute PIW. 1974.
