= Warsaw County Subdistrict (Home Army) =

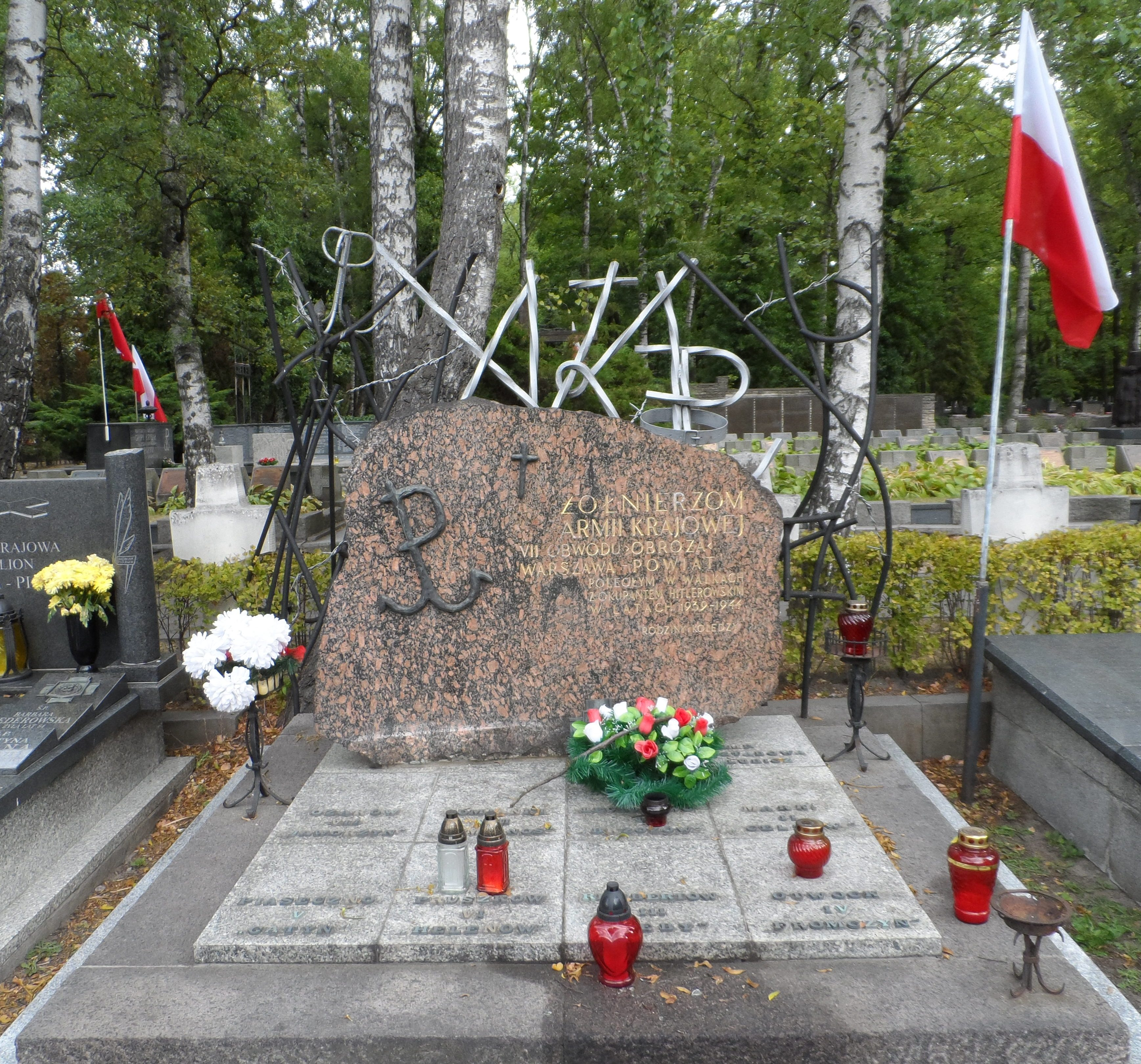
Memorial of the soldiers of the Sub-district Obroża at the Powązki Military Cemetery in Warsaw

The Sub-district VII of Warsaw suburbs (of Armia Krajowa) (Polish: Obwód VII Warszawa podmiejska), also called Sub-district collar (Polish: Obwód Obroża) was a territorial organisational unit of the District of Warsaw of Armia Krajowa, which acted during the German occupation of Poland. Military units of that sub-district took part in the Warsaw Uprising of 1944.

== Organisation ==
The sub-district operated since 1940 and covered the area of the then powiat of Warsaw, excluding the city area of Warsaw itself. During the whole period of German occupation the chief of the sub-district was major Kazimierz Krzyżak pseudonym Bronisław or Kalwin.

The sub-district was divided into regions:

- Region I – of "Marianowo–Brzozów" – Legionowo – commanded by major Roman Kłoczkowski pseudonym "Grosz";
- Region II – of "Celków" – Marki – commanded by major Henryk Okińczyc pseudonym "Bill";
- Region III – of "Dęby" – Rembertów;
- Region IV – of "Fromczyn" – Otwock;
- Region V – of "Gątyń" – Piaseczno – commanded by captain Marian Bródka-Kęsicki pseudonym "Grzegorz"
- Region VI – of "Helenów" – Pruszków;
- Region VII – of "Jelsk–Jaworzyn" – Ożarów – commanded by major Edmund Grunwald pseudonym "Jarema";
- Region VIII – of "Łęgów" – Młociny – commanded by captain Józef Krzyczkowski pseudonym "Szymon";
- Region IX – of "Lubicz" – Warsaw.

In spring 1944 there were 176 military platoons (line, special task and auxiliary service ones) organised in the sub-district, which included ca 10,000 people.

== Tasks assigned in case of military uprising ==
The sub-district was assigned to perform military actions to prevent Germans from bringing down reinforcements for their Warsaw garrison; as well as the organisation and protection of the uprising base like hospitals, air-drop places, supply of weapon, organisation of prisoner camps, etc.

== Course of combat in the Warsaw Uprising 1944 ==
Region I – fights lasted there during several initial days of August. Not the whole area was seized and major Grosz commanded to return to conspiracy. Part of the units were concentrated in neighbouring forests. A battalion, having supplemented its weapons, commanded by lieutenant Bolesław Szymkiewicz pseudonym "Znicz", crossed Wisła river and took part in fights of the Kampinos Group.

Region II – fights lasted also during several initial days of August only. Units fought with a local German garrison and cooperated with the armoured spearhead of the Red Army in the section of Wołomin-Struga. Upon the withdrawal of the Soviet units, it became impossible to continue the fight.

Region III – line units turned up in assigned places of concentration. In the face of a large saturation of the area with German units, the planned military actions were not developed. Reconnaissance was carried and contact was kept with the Sub-district VI. A group of ten to twenty soldiers commanded by officer cadet Czesław Nalewajko pseudonym Cimurak swam across Wisła river and included in the fights of the "Baszta" regiment.

Region IV – because of a stabilisation of the front line in the area of Radość, the region was divided into two parts:

- Northern part happened to be place in the immediate base of concentrated German units,
- Southern part was in the area liberated by Soviet units.

In the northern part no military actions were taken up. In the southern part, actions were taken aimed to provide assistance for advancing soldiers of the 27th Wołyń Division of Armia Krajowa. In September, medical aid was provided for insurgents of the "Kryska group", who succeeded in swimming across Wisła from the Czerniaków bridge-head to the Praga bank of Wisła river.

Region V – it covered the Chojnowo forests, which were a place of concentration of the sub-district's units as well as units of the Sub-district IV of Ochota (of Armia Krajowa) and Sub-district V of Mokotów, which failed to perform their military action on their own area. The commander of the Sub-district IV of Ochota lieutenant-colonel Mieczysław Sokołowski pseudonym Grzymała, who had withdrawn to the Sub-district V, decided to take up an attack to Wilanów / Sadyba, aimed at joining with units fighting in Warsaw. The attack failed. Lieutenant-colonel Grzymała fell in Wilanów. Only one company commanded by sec. lieutenant Stanisław Milczyński pseudonym Gryf managed to force its way to Wilanów. The remaining units of the sub-district withdrew to the area of Chojnowo forests.

Region VI – its units concentrated in the Sękocin forests, but apart from local fights they did not take up larger military actions. The Women Military Service established communication with the commandment of the sub-district of Śródmieście. Additionally, it was provided help for Warsaw inhabitants and insurgent soldiers interned in the Pruszków camp.

Region VII – large German forces concentrated in that region. In Oźarów it was stationed the staff of general Erich von dem Bach-Zelewski. It made impossible to take up military actions by the insurgents. Major Jarema formed a company, which moved to Kampinos Forest and submitted to the command of the Kampinos group.

Rejon VIII was the operational area of the Kampinos group.
