= Warsaw District (Home Army) =

The District of Warsaw (of Armia Krajowa) (Polish: Okręg Warszawa) - one of territorial organisational units of the Polish Home Army, covered the territory of Warsaw and its close neighbourhood i.e. the Powiat of Warsaw. Military units belonging to that district took part in the Warsaw Uprising of 1944.

The rest of the territory of Mazovia, i.e. the Warsaw Voivodship, was included into a larger organisational unit, the Area of Warsaw of Armia Krajowa.

== Organisational structure ==
Chief of the district - colonel Antoni Chruściel pseudonym Monter, Nurt,

- Sub-district I of Śródmieście including the Old Town (Pol.: Obwód I Śródmieście) - commanded by lieutenant-colonel Edward Pfeiffer pseudonym Radwan,
- Sub-district II of Żoliborz, Marymont, Bielany (Pol.: Obwód II Żoliborz, Marymont, Bielany, also called Obwód Żywiciel) - commanded by lieutenant-colonel Mieczysław Niedzielski pseudonym Żywiciel,
- Sub-district III of Wola (of Armia Krajowa) (Pol.: Obwód III Wola) - commanded by major Jan Tarnowski pseudonym Waligóra,
- Sub-district IV of Ochota (Pol.: Obwód IV Ochota) - commanded by lieutenant-colonel Mieczysław Sokołowski pseudonym Grzymała,
- Sub-district V od Mokotów (Pol.: Obwód V Mokotów) - commanded by lieutenant-colonel Aleksander Hrynkiewicz pseudonym Przegonia,
- Sub-district VI of Praga (Pol.: Obwód VI Praga) - commanded by lieutenant-colonel Antoni Żurowski pseudonym Bober,
- Sub-district VII of Powiat Warszawski (Pol.: Obwód VII Powiat Warszawski, also called Obwód Obroża) - commanded by majot Kazimierz Krzyżak pseudonym Bronisław,
- Autonomous Region VIII of Okęcie (Pol.: Samodzielny Rejon VIII Okęcie) - commanded by major Stanisław Babiarz pseudonym Wysocki.

== Effective force ==
The roll of the District of Warsaw of Armia Krajowa on 1 August 1944 recorded approximately 50,000 soldiers. The effective force of military units during the Warsaw Uprising amounted to between 25,000 and 28,000 soldiers. At the Hour "W", around 2,500 armed insurgents began the combat.

== See also ==
- Military description of the Warsaw Uprising

== Bibliography ==
- Kirchmayer Jerzy: Powstanie Warszawskie [Warsaw Uprising], Warszawa 1984.
