= Downtown Subdistrict (Home Army) =

The Sub-district I of Śródmieście (of Armia Krajowa) (Polish: Obwód II Śródmieście also named as Obwód Radwan) - a territorial organisational unit of the District of Warsaw of Armia Krajowa. It covered the area of Śródmieście in Warsaw, fought in conspiracy during the German occupation of Poland during World War II and openly during the Warsaw Uprising 1944.

Sub-district commander was Edward Pfeiffer, codenamed Radwan.

== See also ==
- Military description of the Warsaw Uprising
