= Praga Subdistrict (Home Army) =

The Sub-district VI of Praga (of Armia Krajowa) (Polish: Obwód VI Praga) - a territorial organisational unit of the District of Warsaw of Armia Krajowa. It covered the area of Praga of Warsaw, fought in conspiracy during the German occupation of Poland and openly during the Warsaw Uprising of 1944.

== Period of conspiracy ==
The sub-district VI of Praga of the then Związek Walki Zbrojnej was created in November 1939 and was commanded by lieutenant-colonel Szramka Gliszczyński pseudonym "Zawisza".

In 1941 the sub-district was divided into regions of training, tactics and organisational purposes. Five regions were created, equipped with their staffs and service units.

- Region I: Nowe Bródno / Pelcowizna - commanded by captain Zygmunt Pawlik pseudonym "Antoni".
- Region II: Bródno / Targówek / Targówek Fabryczny - commanded by captain Kazimierz Lichodziejowski pseudonym "Tara".
- Region III: Grochów / Saska Kępa - commanded by captain of horse Tadeusz Schollenderger pseudonym "Rakowski".
- Region IV: Michałów - commanded by major Henryk Bełdycki pseudonym "Stefan".
- Region V: Praga Centralna - commanded by captain Zygmunt Bobrowski pseudonym "Ludwik".

Since 24 July 1944 German motor infantry, artillery and tank units began to come in large number into Praga. On 1 August at 7:30 a.m. the commander of the sub-district received an order to start military action on 5:00 p.m. Special emphasis was put in it on barring the bridges on Wisła river. Because of late reception of the order, which in accordance with the assumptions ought to have been delivered 24 hours prior to the commencement of the fights, the mobilisation of forces and means of the sub-district was deficient. In connection with a large concentration of German forces in Praga as well as execrable state of armament of conspirators, which had become manifest during previous action stations, part of officers and soldiers of the sub-district put in question the use to take up fight in Praga.

== Period of fights in the Warsaw Uprising 1944 ==
At the hour "W" ca 40% soldiers out of the nominal number of the sub-district were mobilized. The weapon in possession until the uprising was by far insufficient and included:

- 272 pcs of rifles of various models with 4,800 pcs of ammunition,
- 6 heavy machine-guns with 2,600 pcs of ammunition,
- 7 pcs of hand machine-guns,
- 1 pcs of anti-tank gun with 80 cartridges,
- 10 pcs of submachine-guns and 900 pcs of ammunition,
- 35 pcs of Sten submachine-guns,
- 1000 pcs of hand-grenades (including 500 pcs of so-called sidol hand-grenades manufactured in conspiracy),
- ca 600 pcs of incendiary bottles.

Because of a shortage of weapon (often a failure to deliver it to places of assembly) and incomplete mobilisation, many units of the sub-district did not reach the state of fighting readiness.

- Region I: Fight was started at 5:00 on 1 August. Railway workshops in Oliwska street defended by ca 200 German soldiers were attacked. In face of strong resistance of the enemy it was made a retreat to the building of a school in Bartnicza street. Attacks on a bridge on the Wisła-Bug canal and on barracks in Golędzinów failed. Upon an introduction of tanks into fight by Germans, the insurgents were forced to withdraw to Targówek.
- Region II: An attack on a battery of anti-aircraft artillery broke down under a heavy fire of guns and machine-guns. The building of the administration of Bródno cemetery was not seized. Bur the building of a school in Oszmiańska street was captured as well as the building of the 24th Police Station where from ten to twenty pcs of rifles and pistols were found.
- Region III: Because of the presence of strong German armoured units and very poor armament, insurgents did not decide to start the attack.
- Region IV: The attack on the barracks of the 36th Infantry Regiment of "Academic Legion" (Polish: 36 Pułk Piechoty Legii Akademickiej) in 11 Listopada street broke down under heavy fire of enemy machine-guns and 16 tanks. The attack on a railway guard post in Św. Wincentego street, defended by an armoured train, failed.
- Region V: There were captured the Warsaw Wilno Railway Station (Polish: Warszawa Wileńska), building of the administration of the Polish State-owned Railways (Polish: Polskie Koleje Państwowe), the post office and the telephone exchange in Wileńska street, building of the slaughter-house in Sierakowskiego street and a school building in Kawęczyńska street. The attack on the strongly defended Kierbedź Bridge (Polish: Most Kierbedzia) and on the gendarmerie station in Targowa street failed. A group of 12 German tanks moved along Grochowska / Targowa / 11 Listopada streets and make impossible to the insurgents to erect barricades. Also, because of an overwhelming advantage of fire by the enemy, the seizure of the Poniatowski Bridge (Polish: Most Poniatowskiego) failed.

On the second day of the uprising, several hundred insurgents continued their fight in several points of Praga. Because of an overwhelming German advantage, incomplete mobilisation of sub-district's forces and poor armament, fight in Praga went out after 3 days.

On 4 August the commander of the sub-district lieutenant-colonel Antoni Żurowski pseudonym "Bober", "Papież", with approval of the commander of the District of Warsaw (of Armia Krajowa), ordered to go back to conspiracy.

Some insurgents forced their way to Mokotów, Sadyba and Czerniaków. Two units were transferred to the Kampinos Forest.

== See also ==
- Military description of the Warsaw Uprising
