= Edward Pfeiffer =

Polish Officer

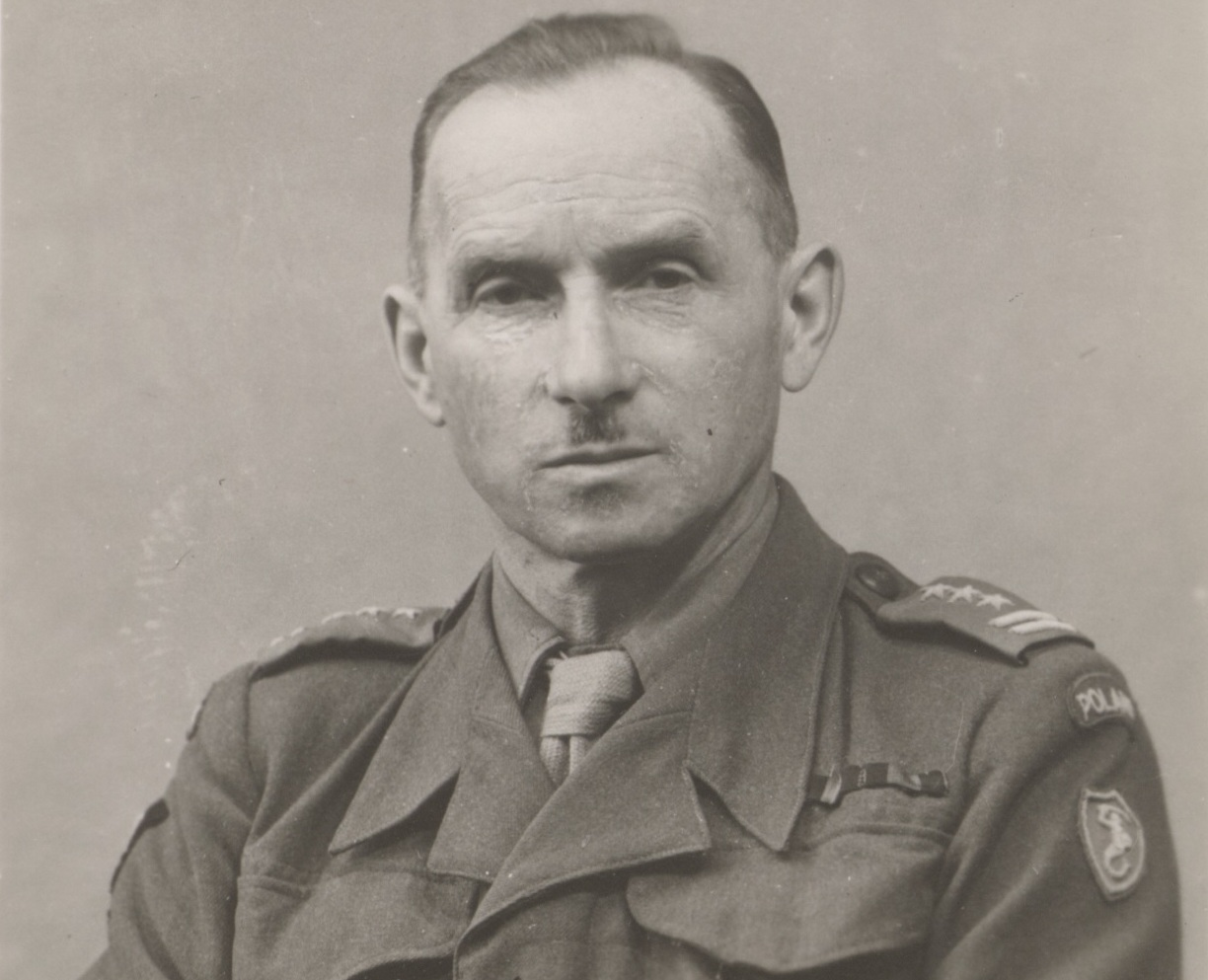
Pfeiffer with the 2nd Polish Corps in Italy c. 1945

Franciszek Edward Pfeiffer, nom-de-guerre Radwan (January 21, 1895 in Łódź – June 13, 1964 in London) was a Polish military commander, Brigadier General of the Polish Army, commander of the Region I Śródmieście of the Home Army during the Warsaw Uprising, cavalier of the Order of Virtuti Militari

Edward Pfeiffer was born in 1895 in a middle-class family in Łódź. He also attended high school there and between 1910 and 1912 he helped to found the Polish Scouting Association and a secret school organization "Collegial Self-Help" whose purpose was education in the Polish language (partly banned or restricted in the Russian Empire) and the study of Polish history. The group also distributed books which had been banned by the Tsarist censors.

== Honours and awards ==
- Gold Cross of the Order of Virtuti Militari, previously awarded the Silver Cross
- Cross of Independence
- Cross of Valour - four times
- Gold Cross of Merit with Swords
- Order of Lāčplēsis, 3rd class (Latvia)
