= Mokotów Subdistrict (Home Army) =

The Sub-district V of Mokotów(of Armia Krajowa) (Polish: Obwód V Mokotów) - a territorial organisational unit of the District of Warsaw of Armia Krajowa. It covered the area of Mokotów in Warsaw, fought in conspiracy during the German occupation of Poland during World War II and openly during the Warsaw Uprising 1944.

Sub-district commander was Aleksander Hrynkiewicz, codenamed Przegonia.

== See also ==
- Military description of the Warsaw Uprising
