= Krosna-Wieś =

- Village
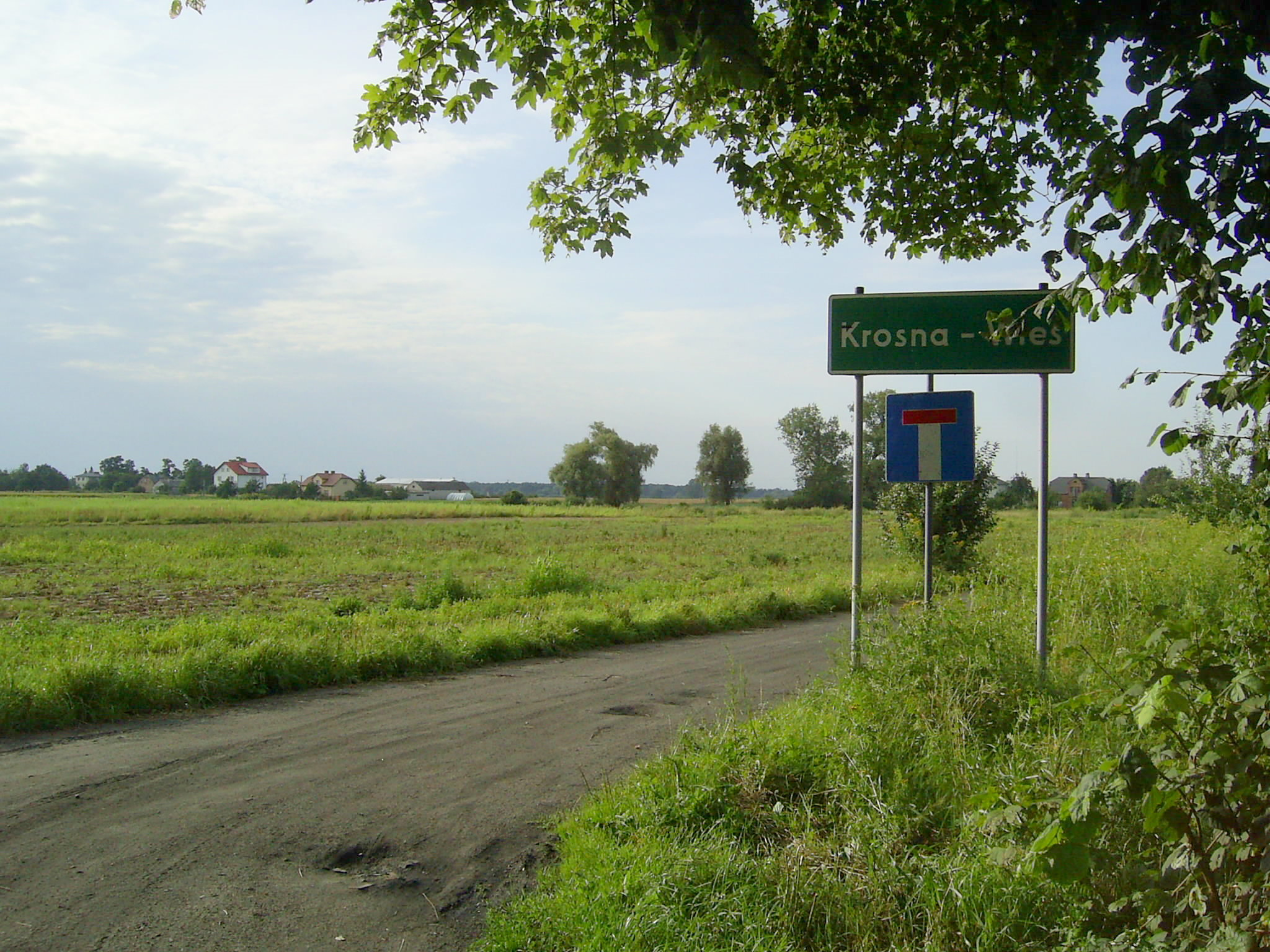
- Road sign leading to Krosna-Wieś

- Location within Poland
- Coordinates: 52°10′20″N 20°42′51″E
- Country: Poland
- Voivodeship: Masovian
- County: Pruszków
- Gmina: Brwinów

Krosna-Wieś [ˈkrɔsna ˈvjɛɕ] is a village in the administrative district of Gmina Brwinów, within Pruszków County, Masovian Voivodeship, in east-central Poland.

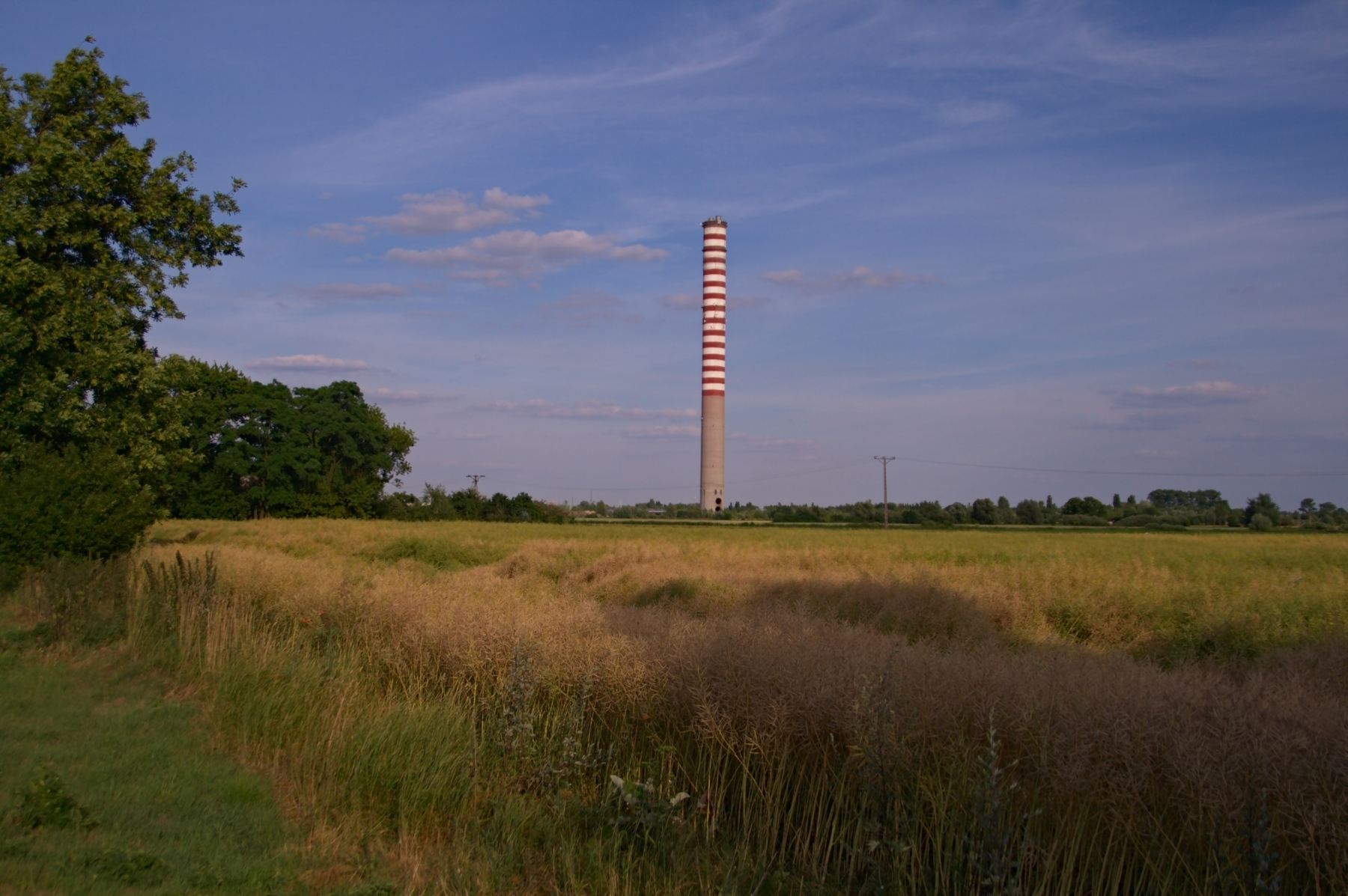
Power plant Chimney seen from Moszna-Wieś
