= Krakowiany =

Krakowiany may refer to the following places in Poland:

- Krakowiany, Lower Silesian Voivodeship (south-west Poland)
- Krakowiany, Masovian Voivodeship (east-central Poland)
- Krakowiany, West Pomeranian Voivodeship (north-west Poland)
