= Domaniewek, Masovian Voivodeship =

Domaniewek
- Village
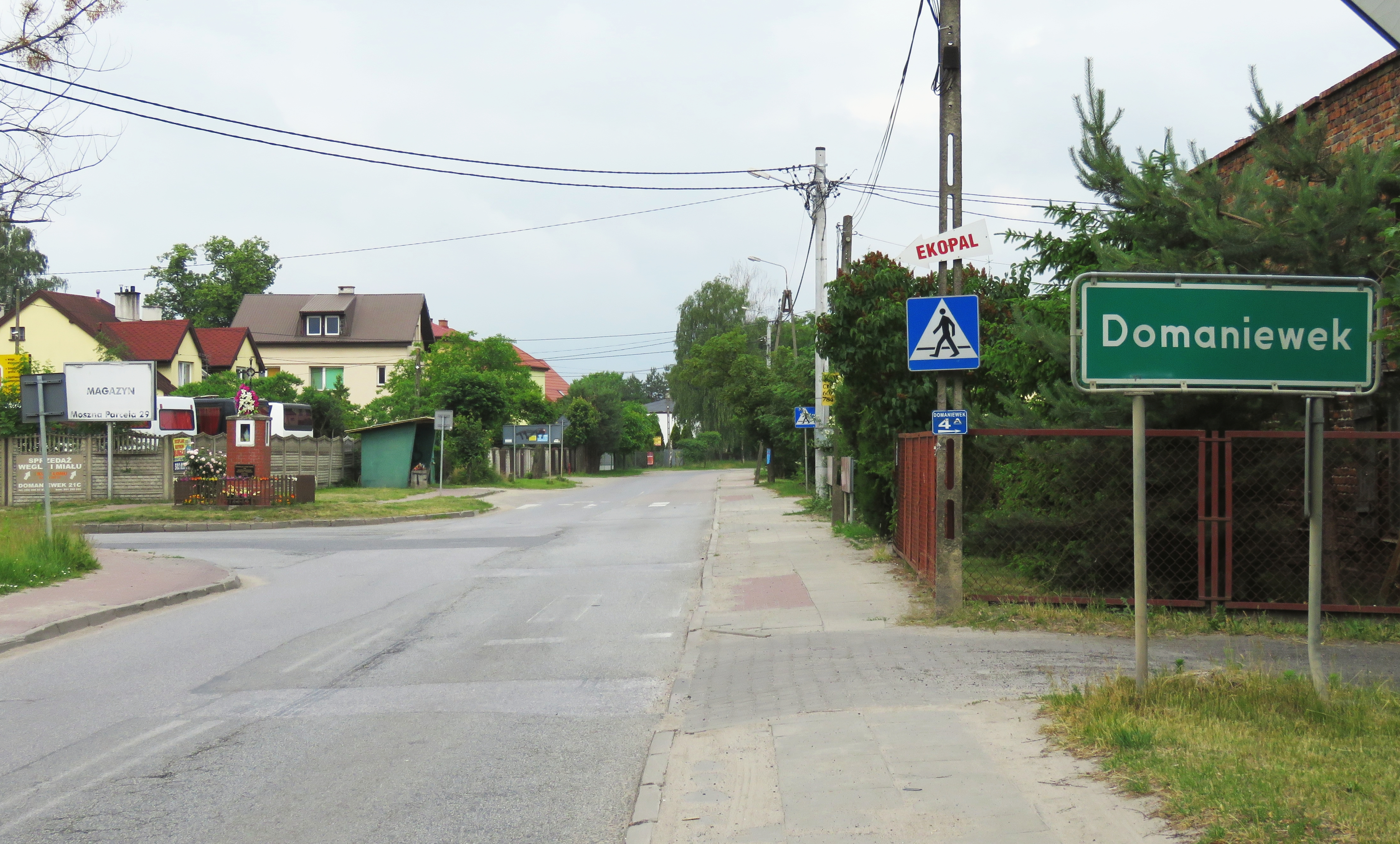

- Location within Poland
- Coordinates: 52°11′28″N 20°45′26″E
- Country: Poland
- Voivodeship: Masovian
- County: Pruszków
- Gmina: Brwinów

Domaniewek [dɔmaˈɲɛvɛk] is a village in the administrative district of Gmina Brwinów, within Pruszków County, Masovian Voivodeship, in east-central Poland.
