= Bieliny, Pruszków County =

Bieliny
- Village
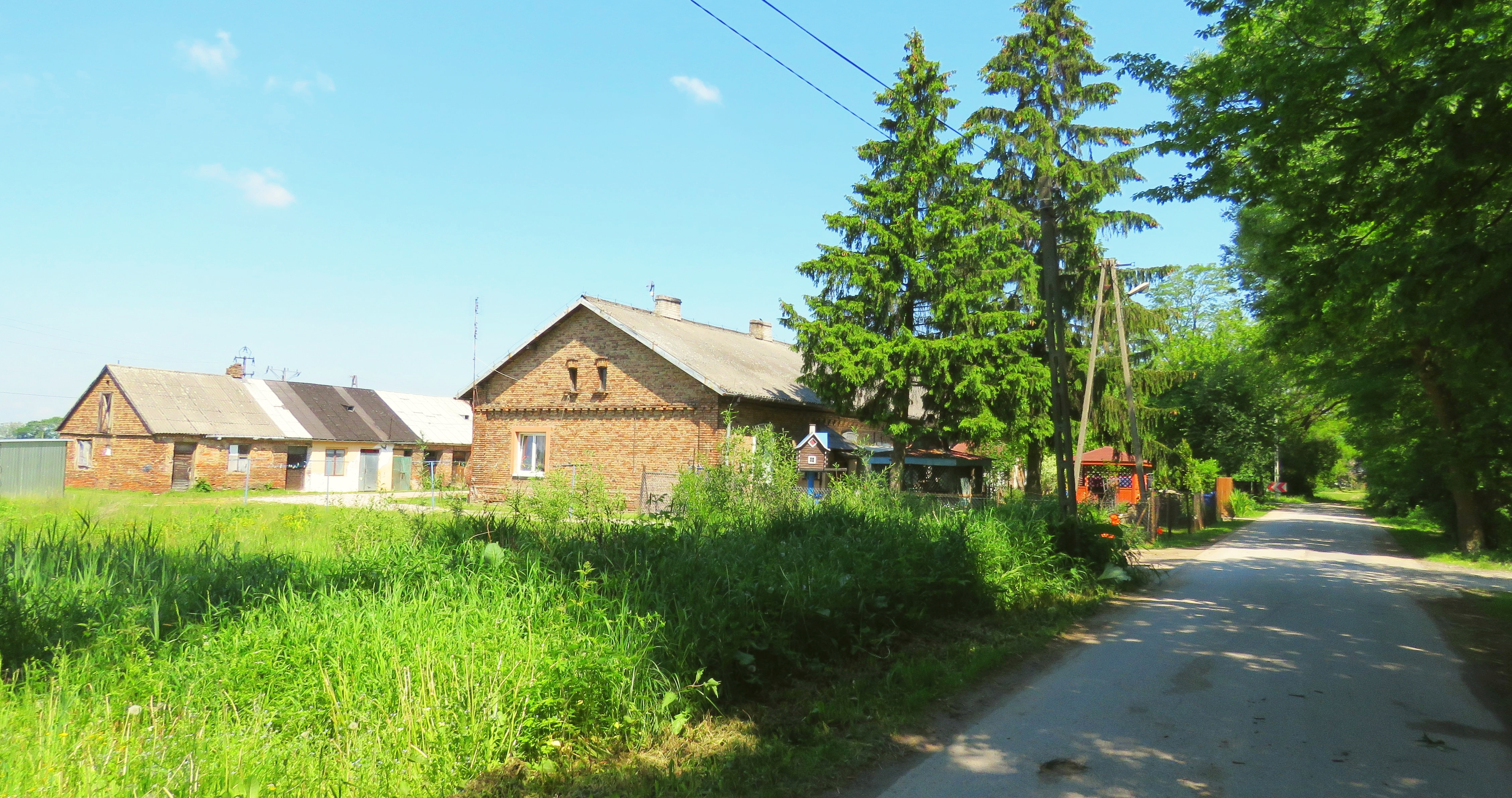

- Location within Poland
- Coordinates: 52°3′17″N 20°45′57″E
- Country: Poland
- Voivodeship: Masovian
- County: Pruszków
- Gmina: Nadarzyn

Bieliny [bjɛˈlinɨ] is a village in the administrative district of Gmina Nadarzyn, within Pruszków County, Masovian Voivodeship, in east-central Poland.
