= Kotowice, Masovian Voivodeship =

Kotowice
- Village
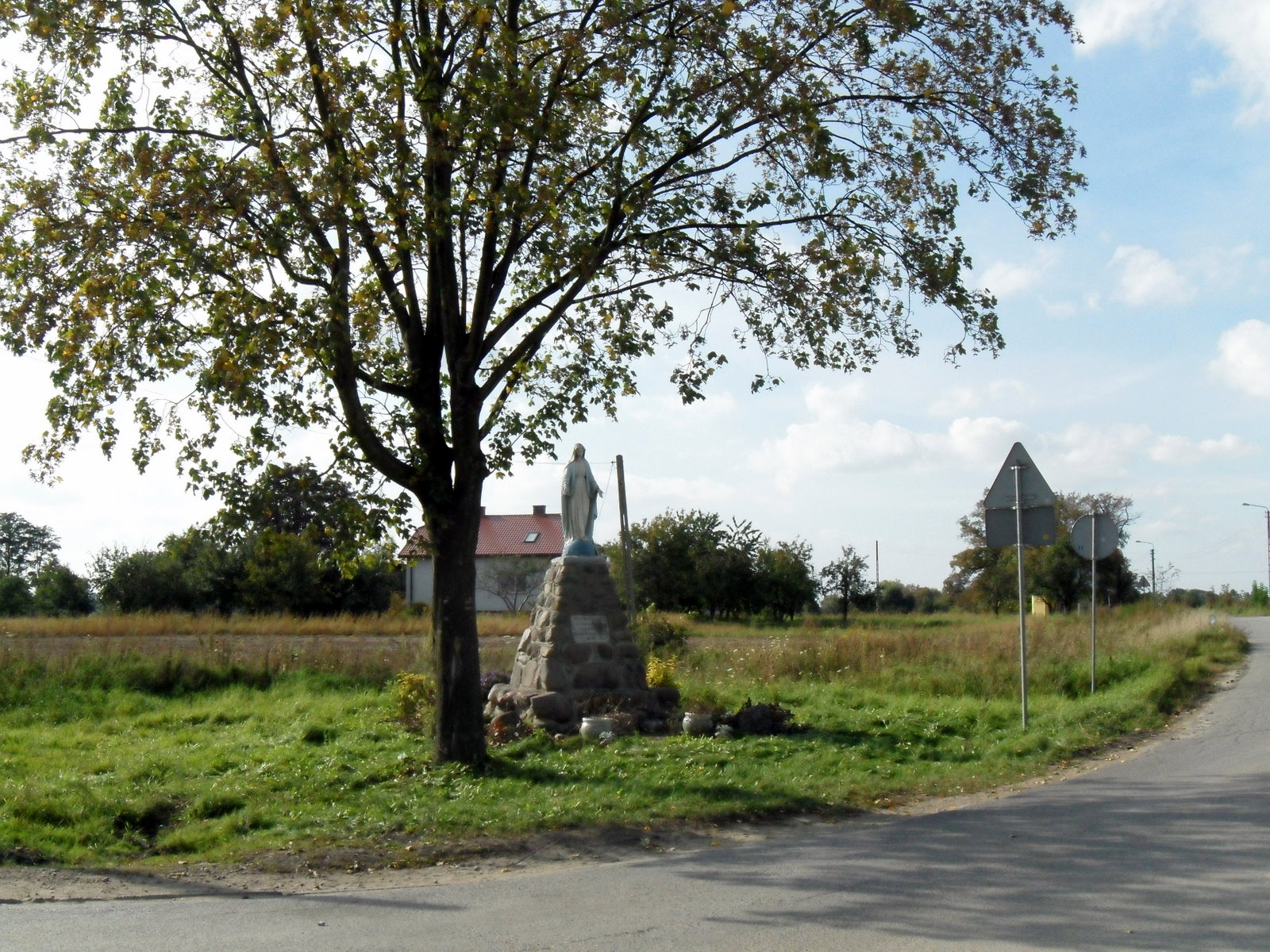

- Location within Poland
- Coordinates: 52°9′N 20°39′E
- Country: Poland
- Voivodeship: Masovian
- County: Pruszków
- Gmina: Brwinów
- Population: 100

Kotowice [kɔtɔˈvit͡sɛ] is a village in the administrative district of Gmina Brwinów, within Pruszków County, Masovian Voivodeship, in east-central Poland.
