= Szamoty, Pruszków County =

Szamoty
- Village
- Location within Poland
- Coordinates: 52°4′N 20°51′E
- Country: Poland
- Voivodeship: Masovian
- County: Pruszków
- Gmina: Nadarzyn

Szamoty (Polish pronunciation: [ʂaˈmɔtɨ]) is a village in the administrative district of Gmina Nadarzyn, within Pruszków County, Masovian Voivodeship, in east-central Poland.
