= Stara Wieś, Pruszków County =

Stara Wieś
- Village
- Location within Poland
- Coordinates: 52°5′N 20°46′E
- Country: Poland
- Voivodeship: Masovian
- County: Pruszków
- Gmina: Nadarzyn
- Population: 539

Stara Wieś [ˈstara ˈvjɛɕ] is a village in the administrative district of Gmina Nadarzyn, within Pruszków County, Masovian Voivodeship, in east-central Poland.
