= Terenia =

- Village
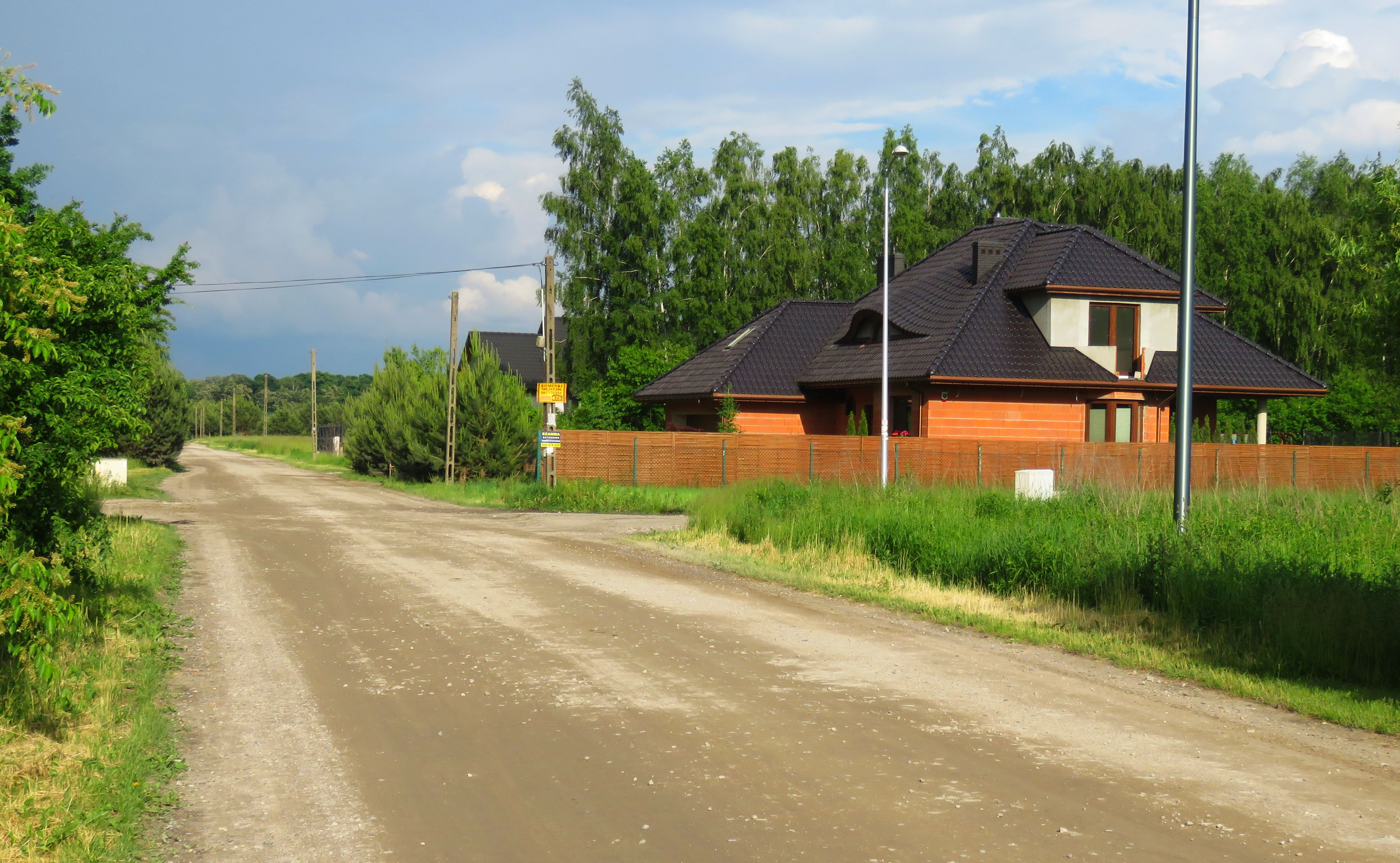

- Location within Poland
- Coordinates: 52°6′N 20°44′E
- Country: Poland
- Voivodeship: Masovian
- County: Pruszków
- Gmina: Brwinów

Terenia [tɛˈrɛɲa] is a village in the administrative district of Gmina Brwinów, within Pruszków County, Masovian Voivodeship, in east-central Poland.
