= Żółwin, Masovian Voivodeship =

Żółwin
- Village
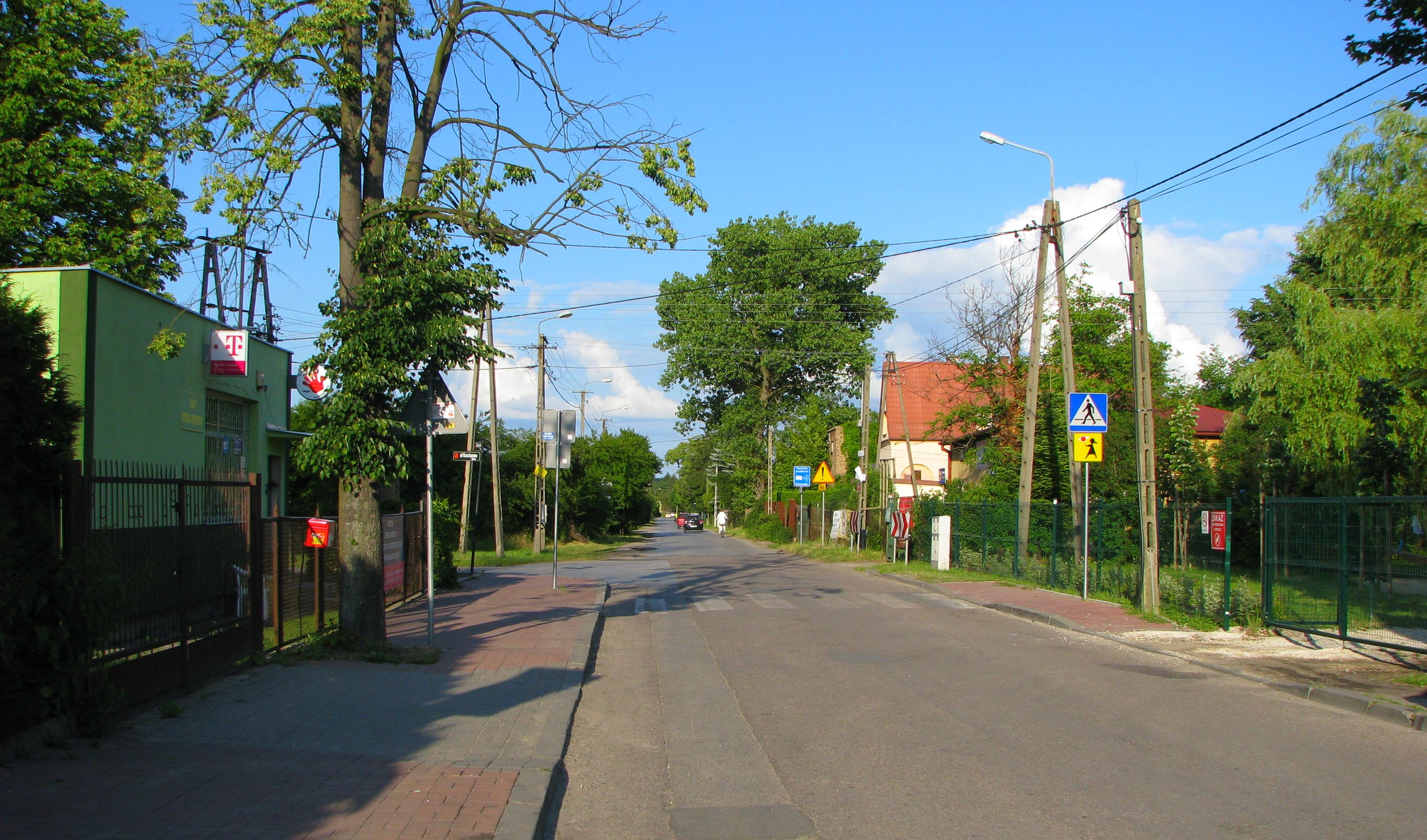

- Location within Poland
- Coordinates: 52°6′24″N 20°44′4″E
- Country: Poland
- Voivodeship: Masovian
- County: Pruszków
- Gmina: Brwinów
- Population: 1,325

Żółwin [ˈʐuu̯vin] is a village in the administrative district of Gmina Brwinów, within Pruszków County, Masovian Voivodeship, in east-central Poland.
