= Urzut =

- Village
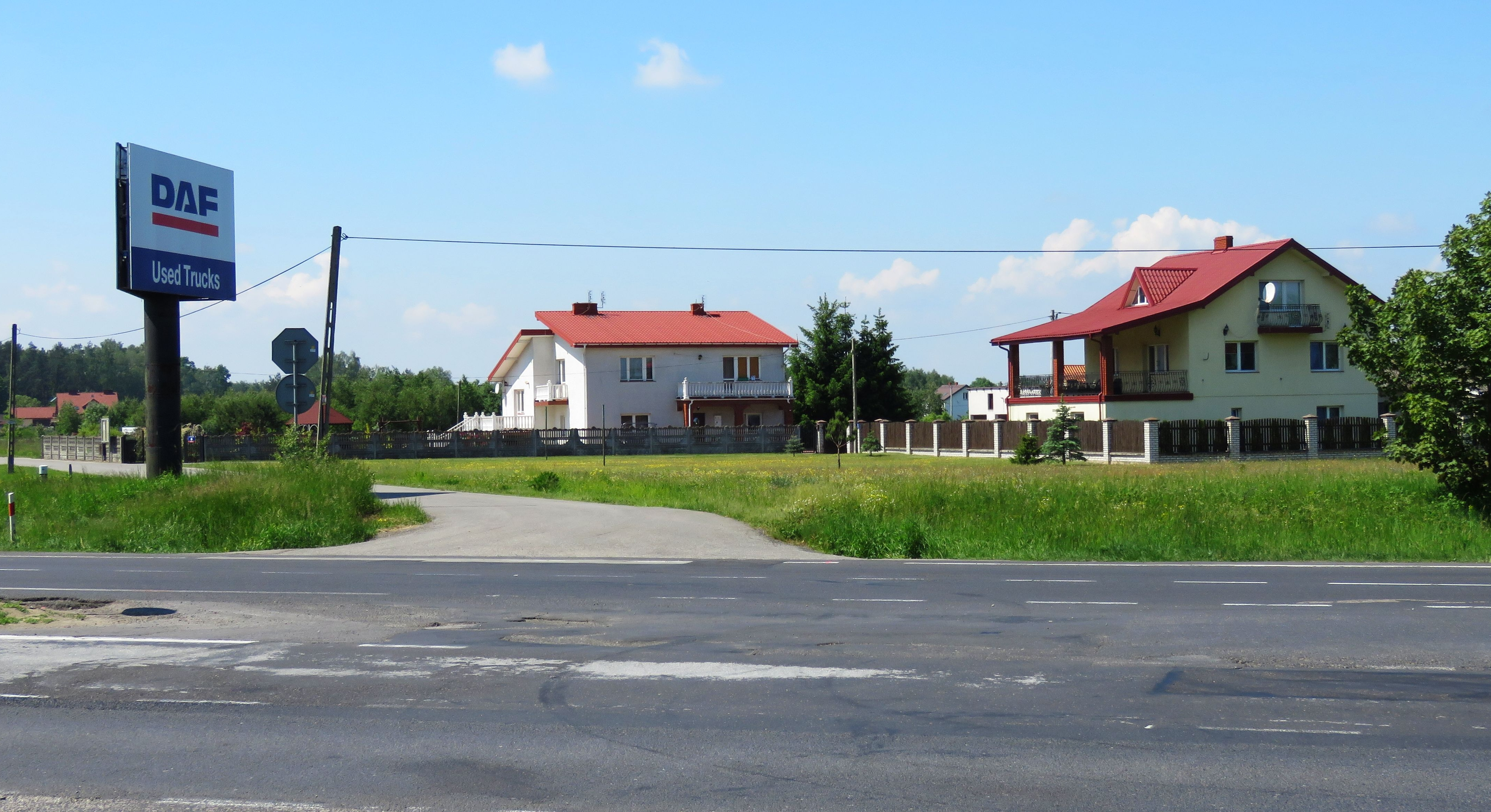

- Location within Poland
- Coordinates: 52°4′N 20°45′E
- Country: Poland
- Voivodeship: Masovian
- County: Pruszków
- Gmina: Nadarzyn

Urzut [ˈuʐut] is a village in the administrative district of Gmina Nadarzyn, within Pruszków County, Masovian Voivodeship, in east-central Poland.
