= Owczarnia, Masovian Voivodeship =

Owczarnia
- Village
- Location within Poland
- Coordinates: 52°6′N 20°43′E
- Country: Poland
- Voivodeship: Masovian
- County: Pruszków
- Gmina: Brwinów
- Website: http://www.owczarnia.ovh.org

Owczarnia [ɔfˈt͡ʂarɲa] is a village in the administrative district of Gmina Brwinów, within Pruszków County, Masovian Voivodeship, in east-central Poland.
