= Rozalin, Pruszków County =

Rozalin
- Village
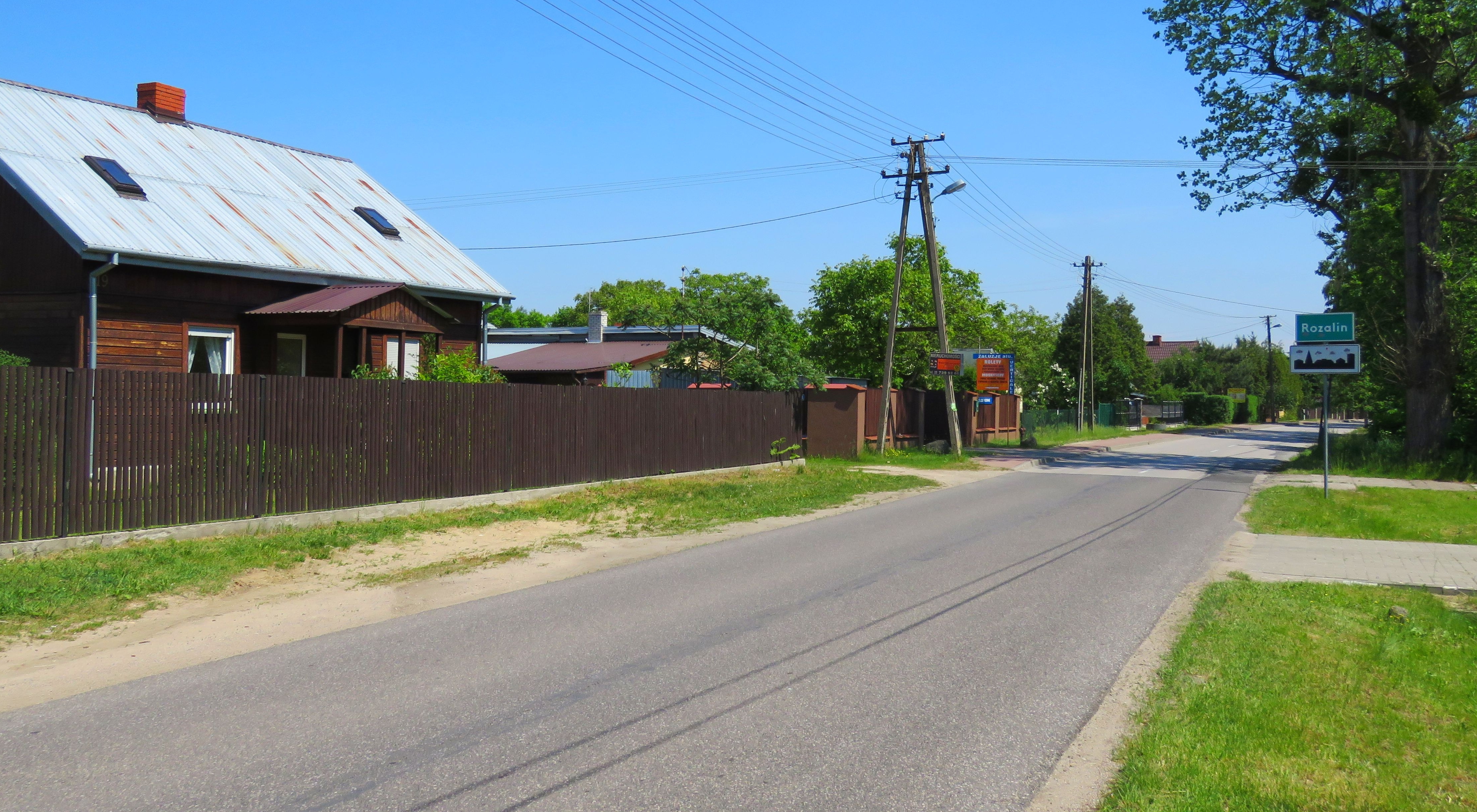

- Location within Poland
- Coordinates: 52°3′N 20°46′E
- Country: Poland
- Voivodeship: Masovian
- County: Pruszków
- Gmina: Nadarzyn
- Website: http://rozalin.net.pl

Rozalin [rɔˈzalin] is a village in the administrative district of Gmina Nadarzyn, within Pruszków County, Masovian Voivodeship, in east-central Poland.
