= Strzeniówka =

- Village
- Location within Poland
- Coordinates: 52°7′N 20°48′E
- Country: Poland
- Voivodeship: Masovian
- County: Pruszków
- Gmina: Nadarzyn
- Population: 250

Strzeniówka [stʂɛˈɲufka] is a village in the administrative district of Gmina Nadarzyn, within Pruszków County, Masovian Voivodeship, in east-central Poland.
