= Rusiecki =

Rusiecki (masculine), Rusiecka (feminine) is a Polish surname. Notable people with the surname include:

- Bolesław Rusiecki (1824–1913), Polish-Lithuanian painter and art collector
- Jarosław Rusiecki (born 1961), Polish politician
- Kanuty Rusiecki (1800–1860), Polish-Lithuanian painter
- Salomea Rusiecka, maiden name of Salomea Halpir (1718 – after 1763)

== See also ==
- Rusiec (disambiguation)
