= Otrębusy =

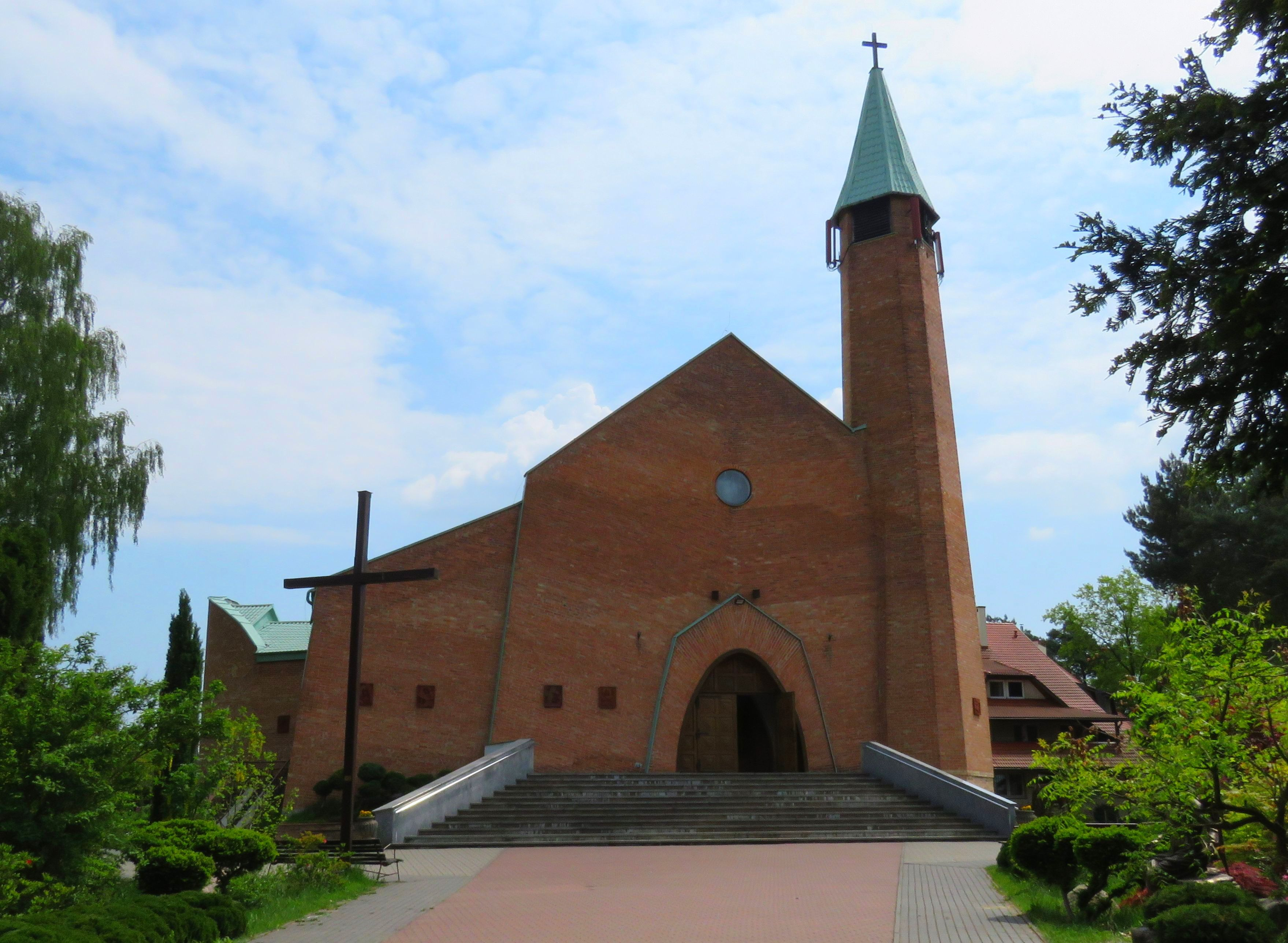
- Mater Ecclesiae church in Otrębusy

- Location within Poland
- Coordinates: 52°7′42″N 20°45′38″E
- Country: Poland
- Voivodeship: Masovian
- County: Pruszków
- Gmina: Brwinów

Government
  - Sołtys: Anna Grzegorowska

Population (2006)
  - Total: 2,000
- Time zone: UTC+1 (CET)
  - Summer (DST): UTC+2 (CEST)
- Postal code: 05-805
- Area code: +48 22
- Car plates: WPR

Otrębusy [ɔtrɛmˈbusɨ] is a village in Poland, in Masovian Voivodship, to the west of Warsaw in the Gmina Brwinów.

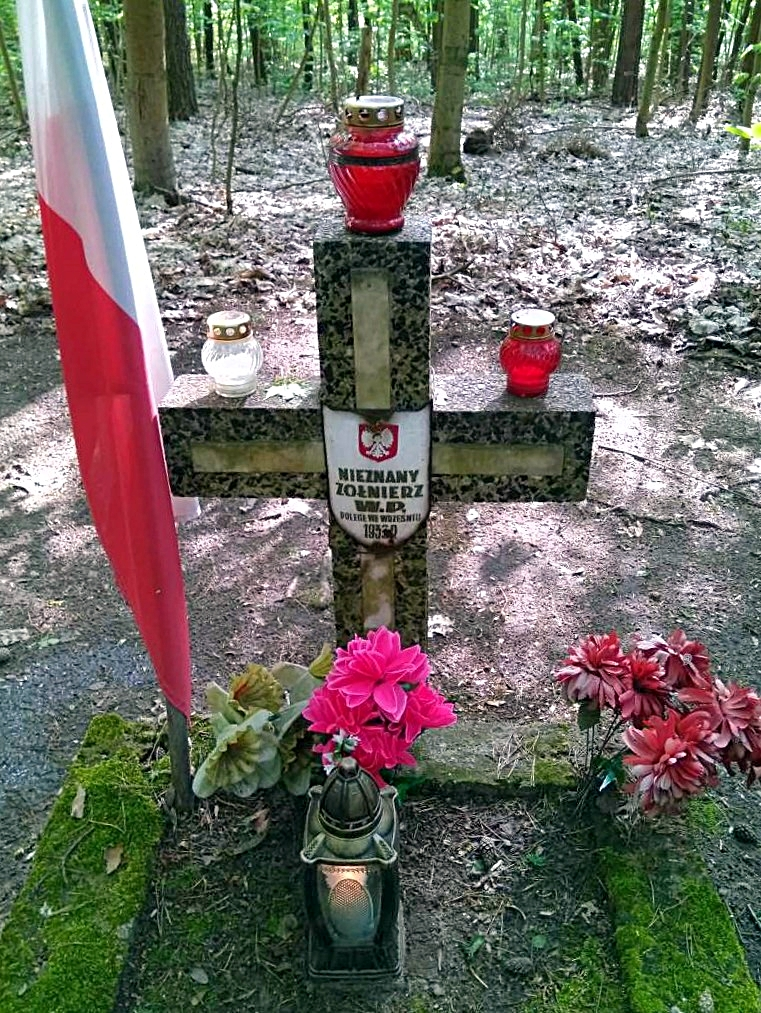
The Tomb of The Unknown Soldier near "Wierzbówek", 23 April 2024

== History ==
The first mention of Otrębusy come from Księgi Błońskie Ziemskie from 1525 and 1534, using the Latin spelling "Otrambusche". Another source is Spis parafii województwa mazowieckiego (parish index of Masovian voivodship) from first half of the sixteenth century.

In 1948, the Mazowsze State Folk Group of Song and Dance was founded in Karolin.

The St. Mary the Virgin Mother of Church parish was established in 1985.

== Access ==
- voivodship road 719 – 22 km (14 mi) to centre of Warsaw
- Warsaw Suburban Railway – about 38 minutes to Warsaw Śródmieście WKD station

== Tourism ==
- Karolin Park and Palace – museum and head office of Mazowsze State Folk Group of Song and Dance
- Toeplitzówka Park and Palace [tɛpliˈt͡sufka] – place of birth of Krzysztof Teodor Toeplitz
- Natural monuments – list in Polish
- Svetovid monument at WKD station
- Museum of Technique and Motorisation
- Museum of Folk Art
