= Kopana, Pruszków County =

Kopana
- Village
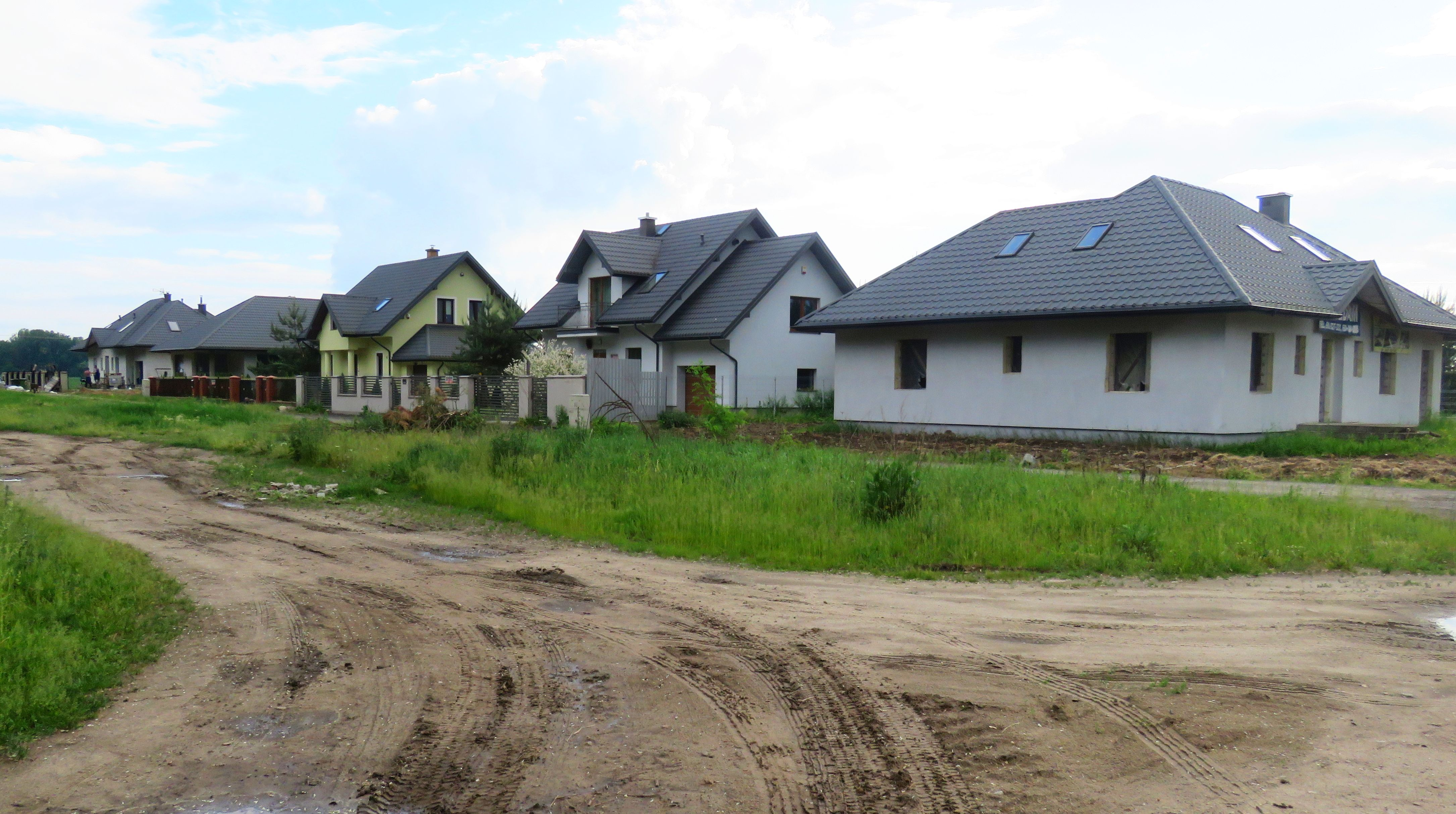

- Location within Poland
- Coordinates: 52°5′38″N 20°44′16″E
- Country: Poland
- Voivodeship: Masovian
- County: Pruszków
- Gmina: Brwinów
- Population: 30

Kopana [kɔˈpana] is a village in the administrative district of Gmina Brwinów, within Pruszków County, Masovian Voivodeship, in east-central Poland.
