= Wolica, Pruszków County =

Wolica
- Village
- Location within Poland
- Coordinates: 52°7′9″N 20°51′58″E
- Country: Poland
- Voivodeship: Masovian
- County: Pruszków
- Gmina: Nadarzyn
- Population: 510

Wolica [vɔˈlit͡sa] is a village in the administrative district of Gmina Nadarzyn, within Pruszków County, Masovian Voivodeship, in east-central Poland.

In 2005 the village had a population of 510.
