= Domaniew, Masovian Voivodeship =

Domaniew
- Village
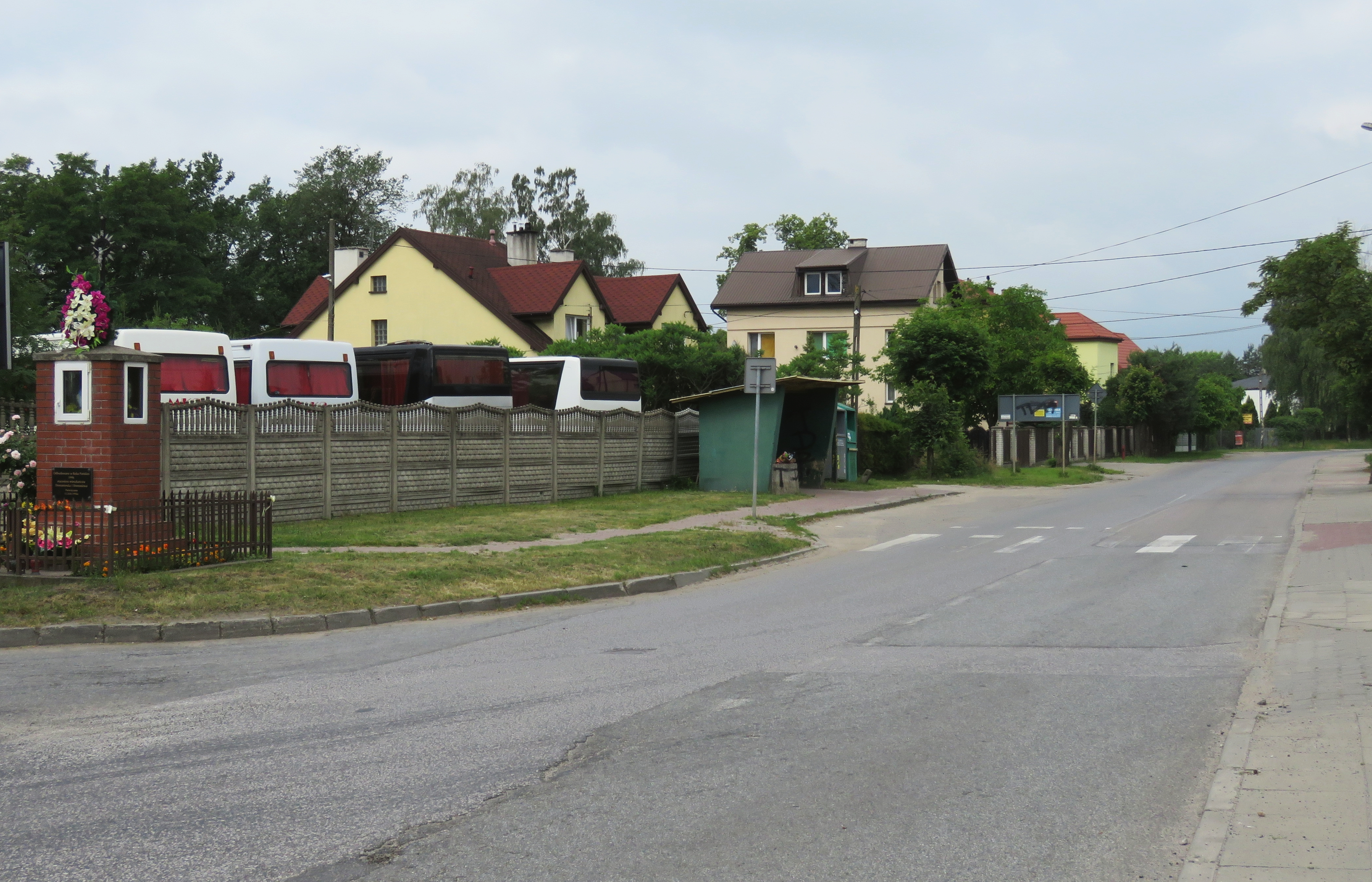

- Location within Poland
- Coordinates: 52°11′N 20°46′E
- Country: Poland
- Voivodeship: Masovian
- County: Pruszków
- Gmina: Brwinów

Domaniew [dɔˈmaɲɛf] is a village in the administrative district of Gmina Brwinów, within Pruszków County, Masovian Voivodeship, in east-central Poland.
