= Wola Krakowiańska =

- Village
- Location within Poland
- Coordinates: 52°01′51″N 20°48′18″E
- Country: Poland
- Voivodeship: Masovian
- County: Pruszków
- Gmina: Nadarzyn

Wola Krakowiańska [ˈvɔla krakɔˈvjaɲska] is a village in the administrative district of Gmina Nadarzyn, within Pruszków County, Masovian Voivodeship, in east-central Poland.
