= Kanie, Masovian Voivodeship =

Kanie
- Village
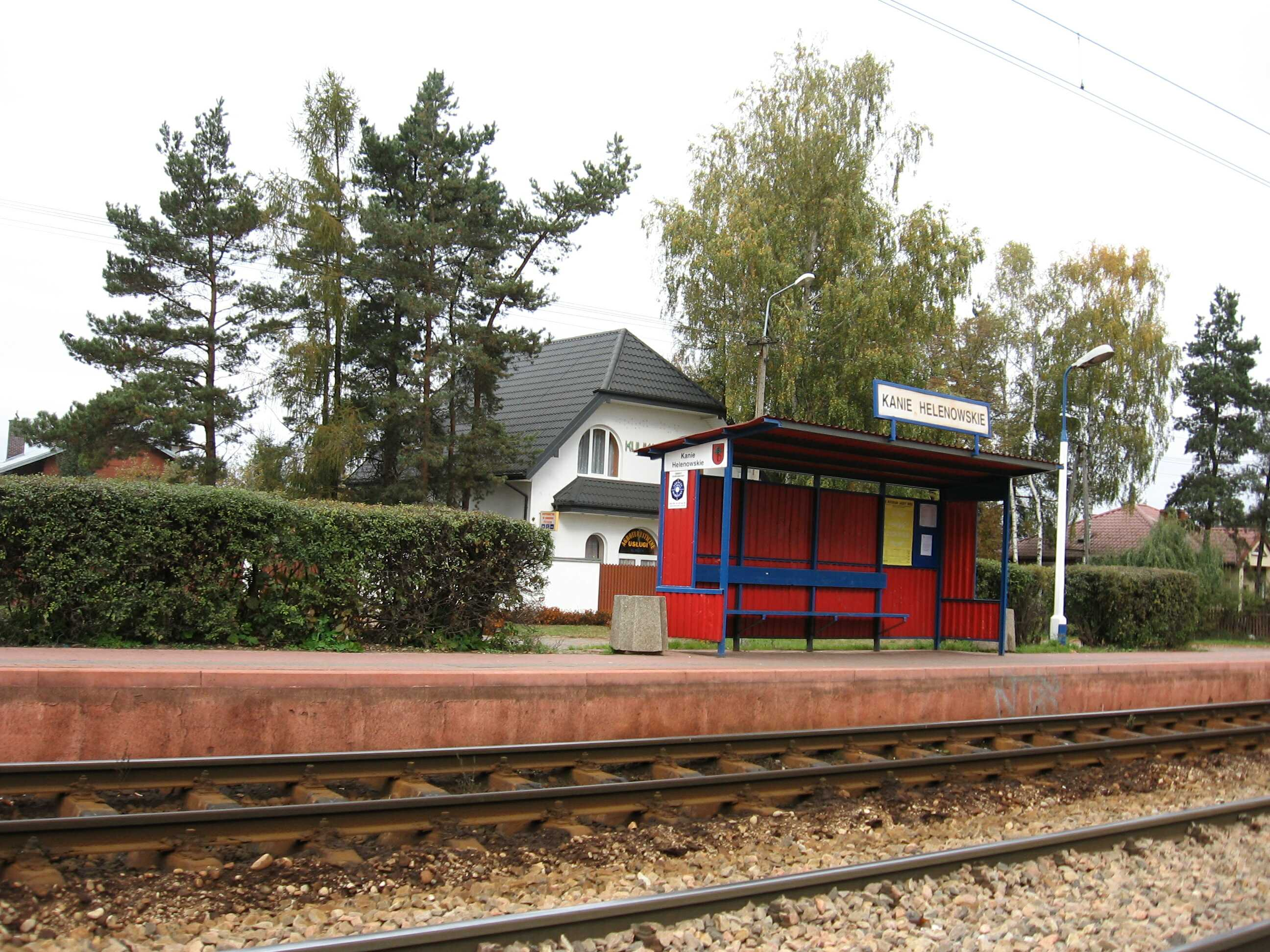

- Location within Poland
- Coordinates: 52°7′52″N 20°46′20″E
- Country: Poland
- Voivodeship: Masovian
- County: Pruszków
- Gmina: Brwinów
- Population: 1,000

Kanie [ˈkaɲɛ] is a village in the administrative district of Gmina Brwinów, within Pruszków County, Masovian Voivodeship, in east-central Poland.
