= Koszajec, Pruszków County =

Koszajec
- Village
- Location within Poland
- Coordinates: 52°10′N 20°45′E
- Country: Poland
- Voivodeship: Masovian
- County: Pruszków
- Gmina: Brwinów

Koszajec [kɔˈʂajɛt͡s] is a village in the administrative district of Gmina Brwinów, within Pruszków County, Masovian Voivodeship, in east-central Poland.
