= Grudów =

- Village
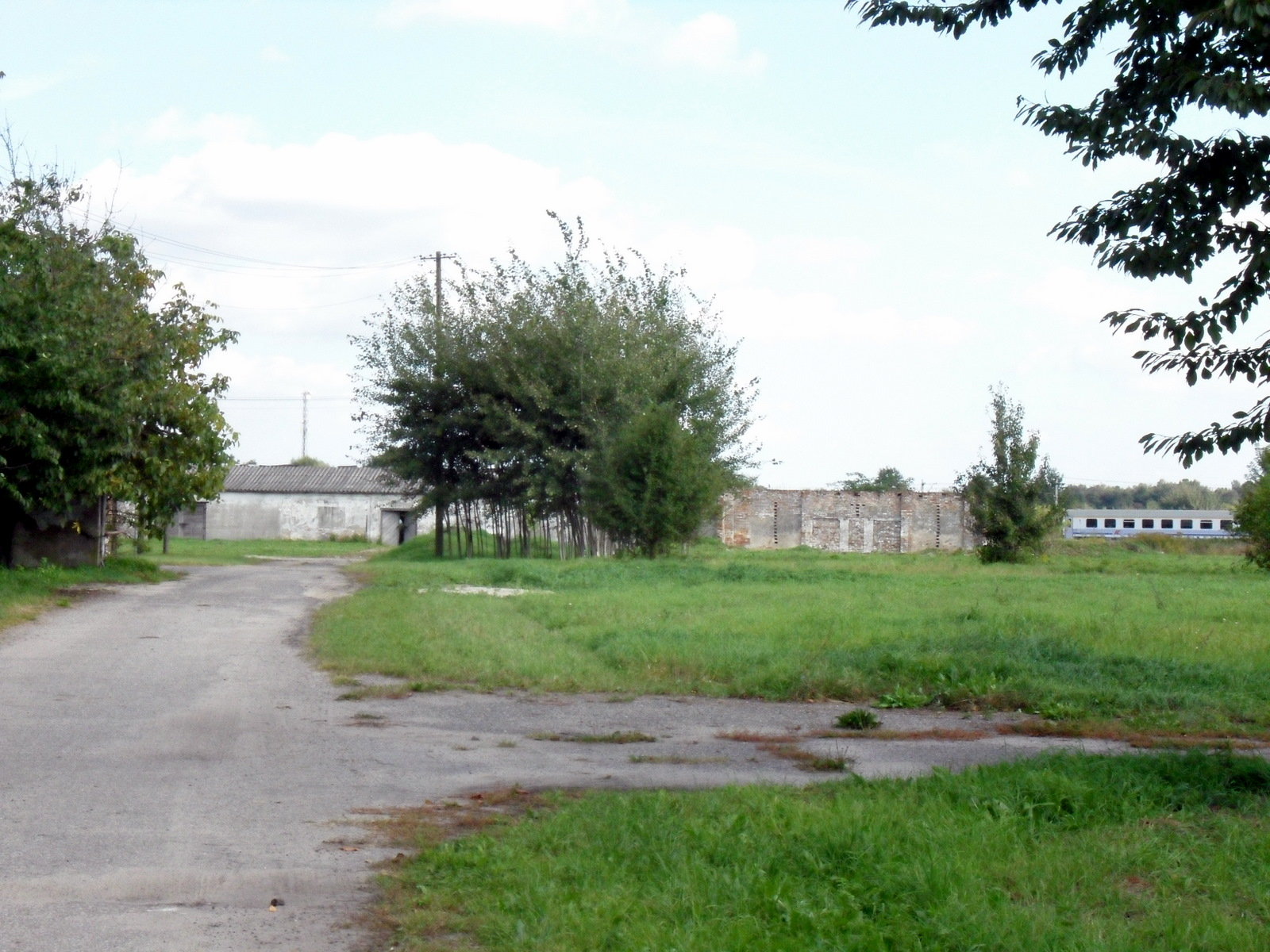
- Park in Grudow

- Location within Poland
- Coordinates: 52°08′11″N 20°41′25″E
- Country: Poland
- Voivodeship: Masovian
- County: Pruszków
- Gmina: Brwinów

Grudów [ˈɡruduf] is a village in the administrative district of Gmina Brwinów, within Pruszków County, Masovian Voivodeship, in east-central Poland.
