= Żabieniec, Pruszków County =

Żabieniec
- Village
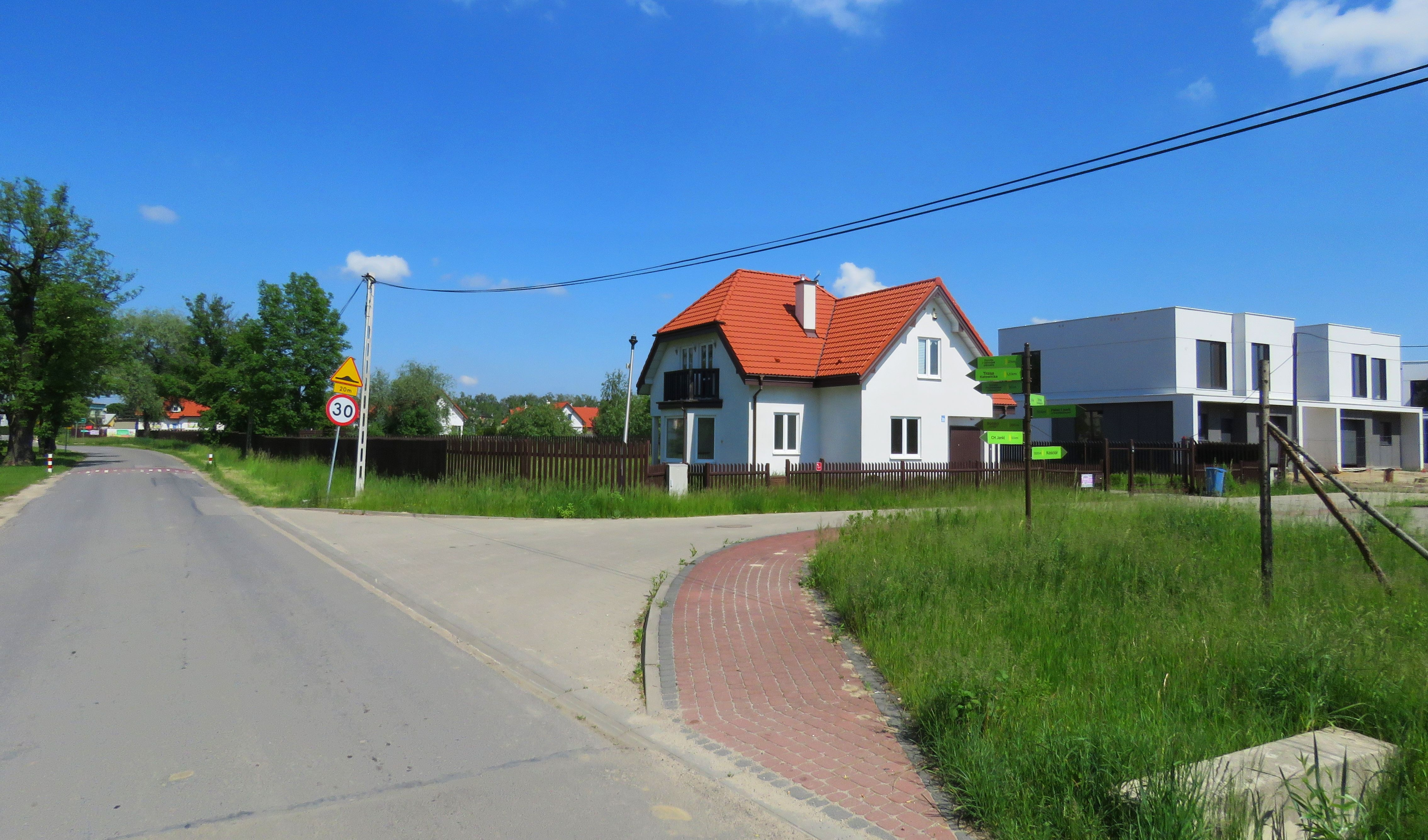

- Location within Poland
- Coordinates: 52°03′30″N 21°02′54″E
- Country: Poland
- Voivodeship: Masovian
- County: Pruszków
- Gmina: Nadarzyn

Żabieniec [ʐaˈbjɛɲɛt͡s] is a village in the administrative district of Gmina Nadarzyn, within Pruszków County, Masovian Voivodeship, in east-central Poland.
