= Popówek, Masovian Voivodeship =

Popówek
- Settlement
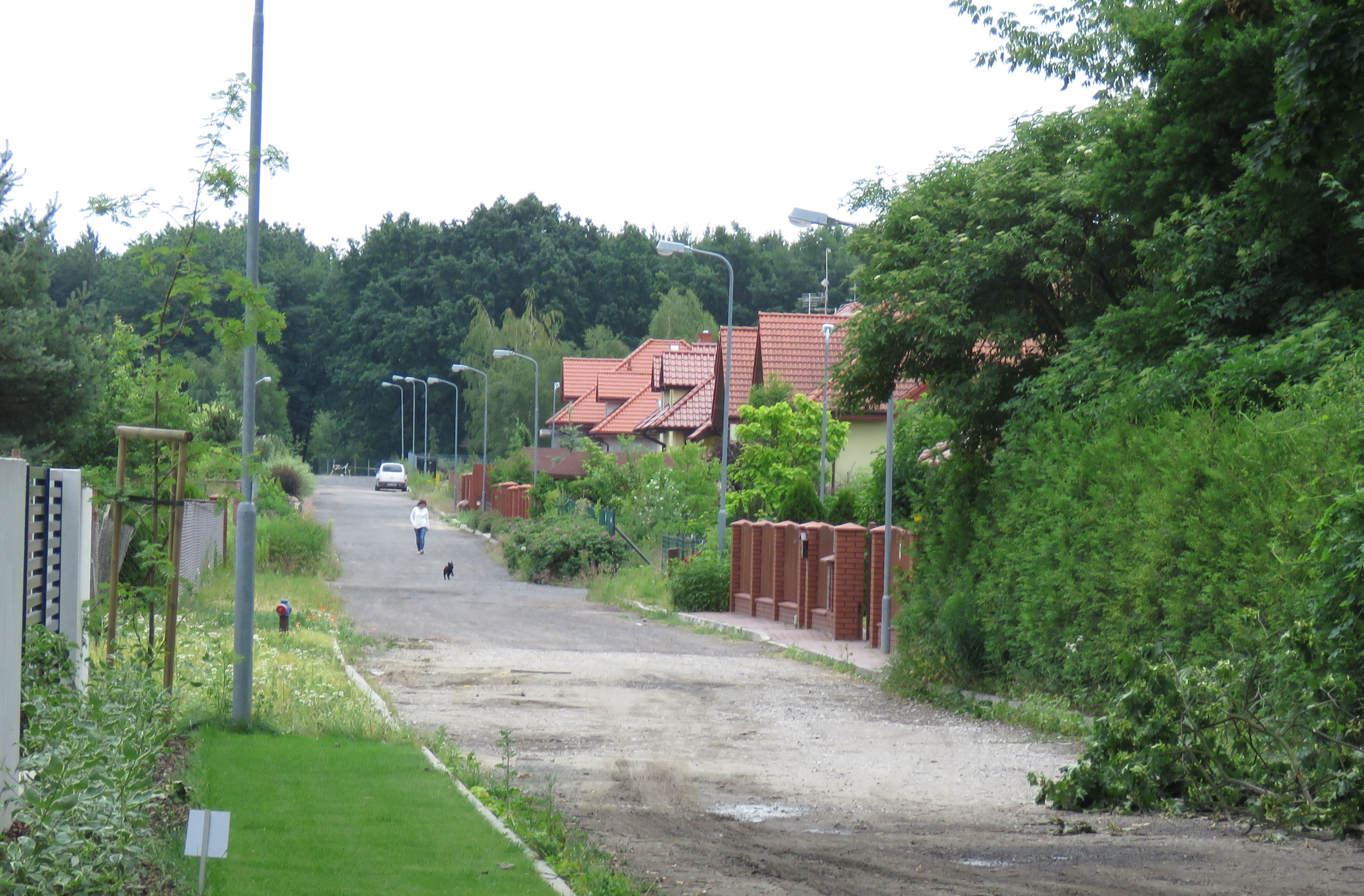

- Location within Poland
- Coordinates: 52°07′30″N 20°47′21″E
- Country: Poland
- Voivodeship: Masovian
- County: Pruszków
- Gmina: Brwinów

Popówek [pɔˈpuvɛk] is a settlement in the administrative district of Gmina Brwinów, within Pruszków County, Masovian Voivodeship, in east-central Poland.
