= Karol Niemira =

Most Reverend Karol Niemira Doctor of Canon law
- Titular bishop of Tavio
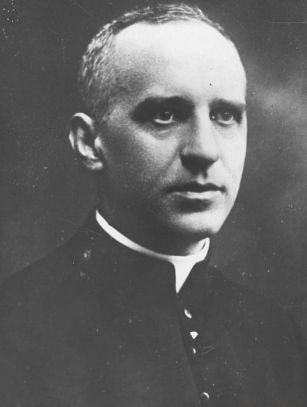
- Bishop Karol Niemira

Orders
- Ordination: 13 November 1911 (Presbyter)
- Consecration: 15 August 1933 (Bishop of Pińsk)

Personal details
- Born: 28 October 1881 Warsaw, Poland
- Died: 8 July 1965 (aged 83) Czubin
- Denomination: Roman Catholic

Karol Niemira (28 October 1881, Warsaw – 8 July 1965, Czubin) was a Polish Roman Catholic priest in the Second Polish Republic, a Doctor of Canon law, and Auxiliary Bishop of Pińsk appointed in 1933, six years before the Nazi German and Soviet invasion of Poland. He was expelled from Pińsk (now Pinsk, Belarus) by the NKVD authorities, and relocated to German occupied Warsaw. He served at a parish next to the Warsaw Ghetto, and participated in the rescue of Jews during the Holocaust in Poland. After World War II Niemira resided in Warsaw and in Czubin where he died.

== Life ==
Karol Niemira was born on 28 October 1881 in Warsaw to a family of former landowners from the Kresy borderlands. In 1904 he entered the seminary in Warsaw. His further studies took him to the Gregorian University in Rome, where he obtained a doctorate in canon law. He was ordained to the priesthood on 13 November 1911.

Since 1913 he served as vicar of the Parish Archdiocese of Warsaw. In 1919, during the rebirth of sovereign Poland he served as a military chaplain. He participated in the political and social life of the capital, and in 1926 sat on the Warsaw City Council. Niemira was also an active member of the Warsaw Charity Society (Warszawskie Towarzystwo Dobroczynności). In 1926 he was appointed pastor of the St. Augustine Parish in Warsaw.

On 26 May 1933 Niemira was appointed Auxiliary Bishop of the Diocese of Pińsk. He was ordained Bishop on 15 August 1933 in Pińsk. In September 1939, after the Soviet invasion of Poland his diocese was shut down and all Servants of God expelled from the Kresy. He settled in Warsaw at the St. Augustine Parish rectory, adjacent to the Warsaw Ghetto. He actively participated in the smuggling of Jews including Rabbis from the ghetto to the Aryan side of the city. After the war he returned to Warsaw under the Stalinist rule and resided in Czubin; he died on 8 July 1965 in Czubin. Karol Niemira was buried at Powązki Cemetery in Warsaw.
