= Parzniew =

- Village
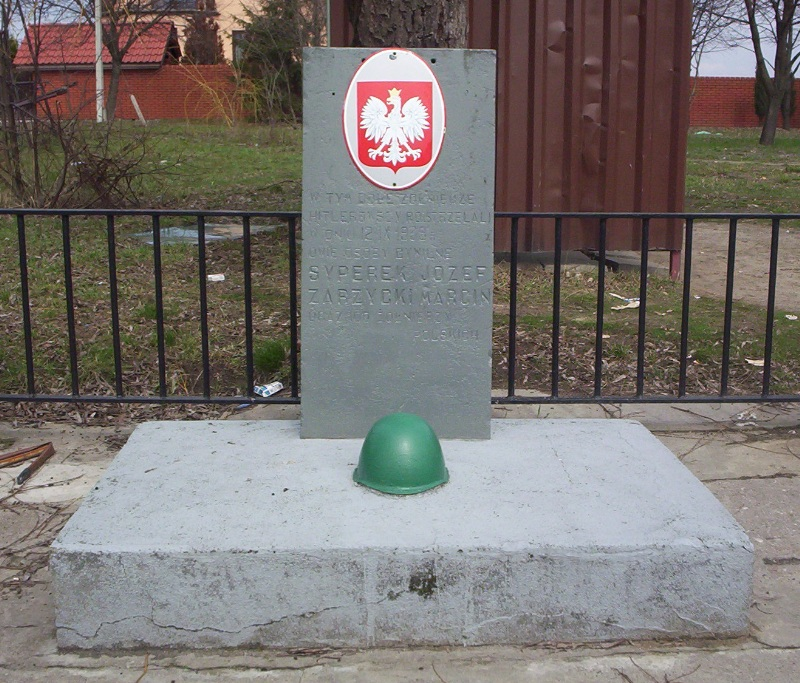
- Monument to the victims of the 1939 massacre

- Location within Poland
- Coordinates: 52°9′N 20°46′E
- Country: Poland
- Voivodeship: Masovian
- County: Pruszków
- Gmina: Brwinów
- Time zone: UTC+1 (CET)
  - Summer (DST): UTC+2 (CEST)
- Vehicle registration: WPR

Parzniew [ˈpaʐɲɛf] is a village in the administrative district of Gmina Brwinów, within Pruszków County, Masovian Voivodeship, in east-central Poland.

During the Invasion of Poland at the start of World War II, on 12 September 1939, around 100 Polish prisoners of war were massacred in Parzniew by the German Wehrmacht.
