= Parole (disambiguation) =

Parole refers to an action of the judiciary system.

Parole may also refer to:

== Geography ==
- Parole, Jammu and Kashmir, a town in the Indian state of Jammu and Kashmir
- Parole, Maryland, an area near Annapolis in the United States
  - Parole Hunt Club in Parole, Maryland
- Parole, Poland

== Arts and entertainment ==
- Parole (2018 film), an Indian Malayalam film
- Parole (2022 film), an Indian Tamil film
- Parole, a 1982 television film featuring Ellen Barkin
- Parole, first reality court show, airing in 1959
- "Paroles", a song by Mike Ink from A Bugged Out Mix
- Parole (TV series), a 2022 Iranian comedy television series

== Other uses ==
- Parole (horse), a race horse during the 19th century
- Parole (linguistics), language in use in the theory of Ferdinand de Saussure
- Parole (United States immigration), a term with three meanings pertaining to U.S. immigration laws
- Parole, a media player used in Xfce
