= Aleksander Werner =

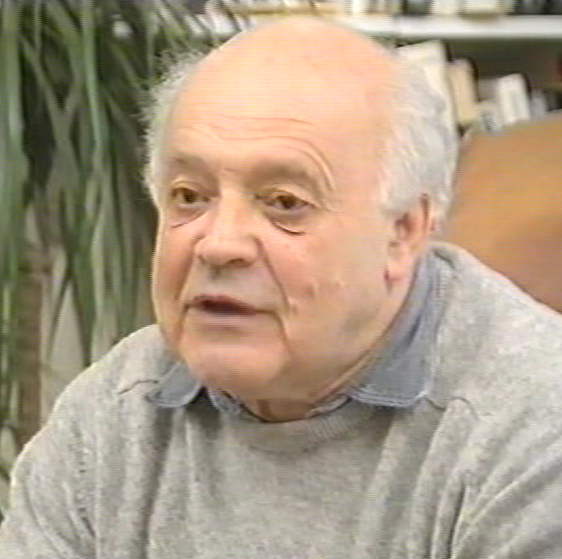
Aleksander Werner (1920-2011)

Aleksander Stanislaw Werner (1920–2011) was a Polish émigré artist who worked for most of his professional life in Great Britain. He worked in paint, collage, woodcut print, and sculpture.

== Birth and heritage ==
Aleksander Stanislaw Werner was born on 13 September 1920, in Brwinow, Poland. He was descended from three generations of artistic tradition, and his family can be traced back to Joseph Werner in a line of recognized Polish painters. Both sides of his family embraced art. His grandfather, Kristopher II Werner, was a painter and architect. Werner's father, Aleksander Werner (1886–1920), was a graduate of the Kraków Academy of Fine Art, but his life as an emerging artist was truncated when he died in the Polish–Soviet War of 1920. He left behind his pregnant wife, Maria. Werner, born after his father's death, inherited his paintbrushes and a box of paints.

== Youth and military service ==
As a youth, Werner joined the Polish war effort. In his military duties, Werner was employed as a war artist, whose painted scenes were published. In his time in World War II, Werner trekked from a prison camp in the northern forests of Russia during and joined up with General Anders's Polish Army in the Middle East. In Palestine he had his first graphic work Polish published. He later continued his work in Italy, drawing for his fellow soldiers and painting the Italian landscape. During his time in Italy, Werner's drawings of war scenes were published in texts such as Kresowa Walczy W Itali.

At the end of the hostilities, Werner was accepted as a second-year student at the Academy of Fine Art in Rome. Werner was one of the last surviving beneficiaries of a gentleman's agreement between two serving soldier officers – one English, one Polish – when both were attached to the British Eighth Army. The English sculptor and painter Edward Bainbridge Copnall, who was to be appointed Principal of The Sir John Cass College of Art, promised General Anders that he would do his best to secure places for the General's battalion of artist/soldiers when the allocation of student places was established for ex-servicemen at the end of the war. The Sir John Cass College welcomed approximately 40 Polish students. It was from these artist/ex-soldiers that the GROUP 49, of which Aleksander Werner was a founding member, was formed.

== Career ==
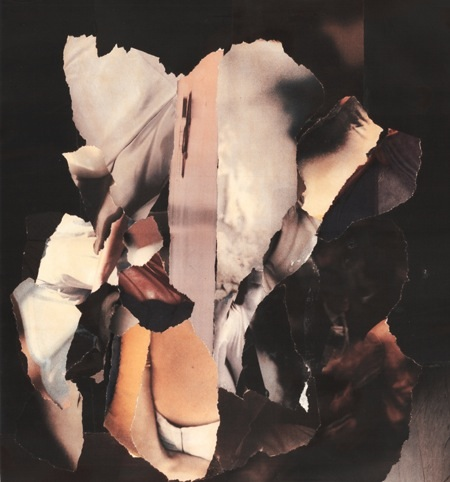
Collage Pink, Aleksander Werner (1975)

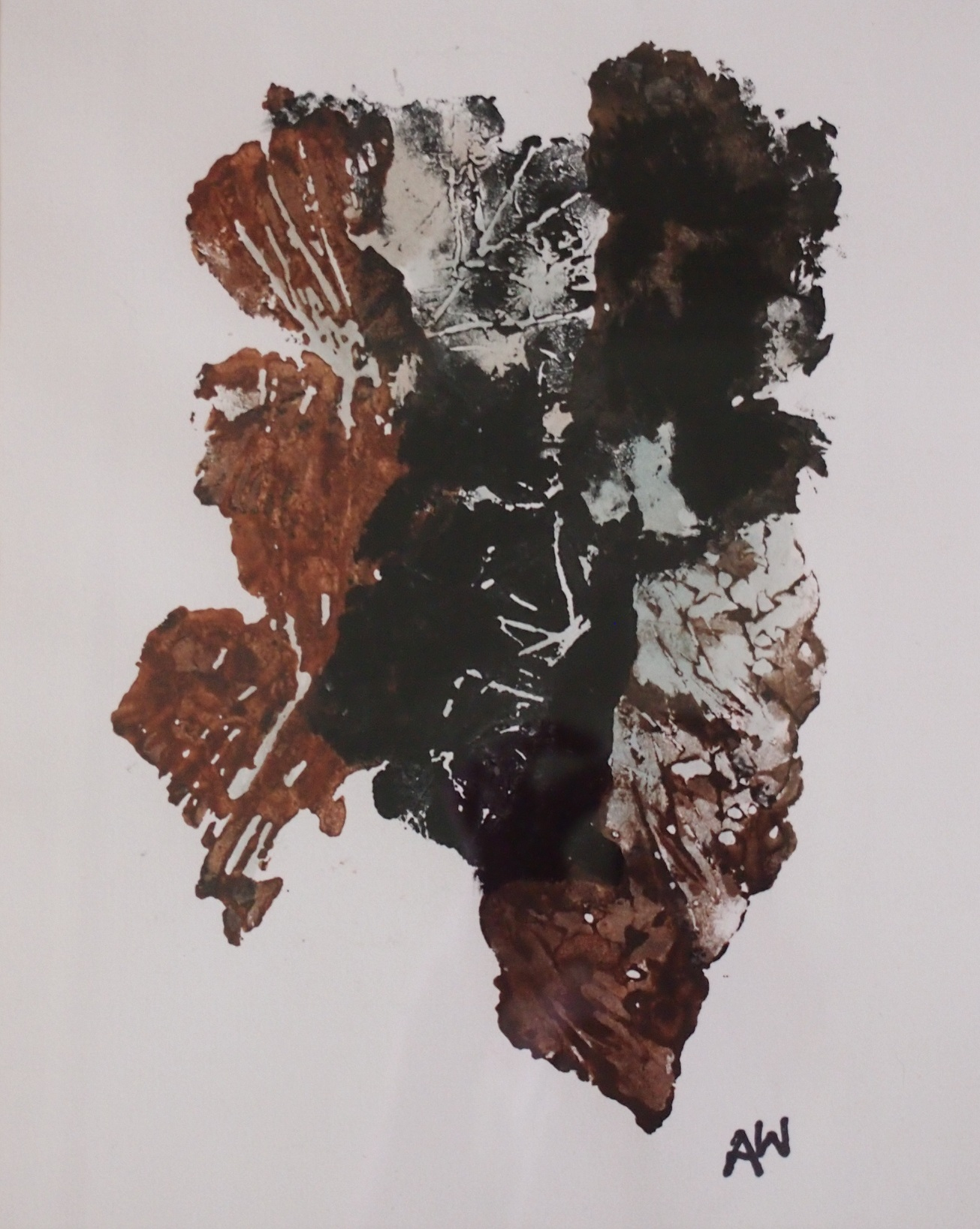
Monotype - Brown/Black, Aleksander Werner (1976)

During his first years in Britain, Werner concentrated on painting and printmaking, and his intricate woodcuts were exhibited in London, Switzerland, Italy and the United States. In 1954–55 Werner was chosen to represent Great Britain in the Victoria and Albert Museum's Colour Woodcut Exhibition. His "dramatic" style made his woodcuts popular as book jacket illustrations in the 1950s. Werner took part in British and international exhibitions of woodcuts until 1963. He also taught wood engraving.

In the early 1960s Werner turned to sculpture. In a major solo exhibition of his work from this period, held in the Drian Gallery in London in the early 1970s, he included almost 50 dynamic pieces in fired clay. His public sculpture commissions included pieces for the Church, for industry and for a number of public buildings throughout the United Kingdom. A large collection of his work is also displayed in Torun, Poland, which exhibits him as a prominent European artist of the 20th century. At the end of the 1960s, the artist created a monumental aluminium relief for the Acton offices of CAV Ltd in London. In 1971, a ceramic mural decorated the headquarters of the Board of TESCO. A gilt bas-relief found a home in front of a tabernacle in a Manchester church. From 1976, Werner’s sculpture was created from fused glass.

== Later life ==
Werner suffered a disabling stroke in 1996 that left him with limited speech and paralyzed down his right side. This prevented him from pursuing his sculptural creativity but, after a long and determined struggle, he was able to continue his creation of colleges, small paintings and drawings. It was a personal triumph for him to be able to attend, in his wheelchair, the opening of an exhibition of his work to date at the POSK Gallery (Hammersmith, London) in 2001.

The artist died in London on 11 September 2011, shortly before his 91st birthday. A tribute to his art was demonstrated again at the POSK gallery in his Retrospective Exhibition, held in September 2012.
