= Rusiec =

Rusiec may refer to the following places:

- Rusiec, Greater Poland Voivodeship (west-central Poland)
- Rusiec, Łódź Voivodeship (central Poland)
- Rusiec, Masovian Voivodeship (east-central Poland)
