= Gmina Brwinów =

Gmina Brwinów Brwinów Commune
- Gmina
- Coat of arms
- Interactive map of Gmina Brwinów
- Coordinates (Brwinów): 52°8′30″N 20°43′0″E
- Country: Poland
- Voivodeship: Masovian
- County: Pruszków
- Seat: Brwinów

Area
  - Total: 69.16 km^{2} (26.70 sq mi)

Population (2006)
  - Total: 21,531
  - Density: 311.3/km^{2} (806.3/sq mi)
  - Urban: 11,968
  - Rural: 9,563
- Website: http://www.brwinow.pl

Gmina Brwinów is an urban-rural gmina (administrative district) in Pruszków County, Masovian Voivodeship, in east-central Poland. Its seat is the town of Brwinów, which lies approximately 7 kilometres (4 mi) south-west of Pruszków and 22 km (14 mi) south-west of Warsaw.

The gmina covers an area of 69.16 square kilometres (26.7 sq mi), and as of 2006 its total population is 21,531, of which the population of Brwinów is 11,968, and the population of the rural part of the gmina is 9,563.

== Villages ==
Apart from the town of Brwinów, Gmina Brwinów contains the villages and settlements of Biskupice, Czubin, Domaniew, Domaniewek, Falęcin, Grudów, Kanie, Kopana, Koszajec, Kotowice, Krosna-Wieś, Milęcin, Moszna-Wieś, Otrębusy, Owczarnia, Parzniew, Popówek, Terenia and Żółwin.

== Neighbouring gminas ==
Gmina Brwinów is bordered by the towns of Milanówek, Podkowa Leśna and Pruszków, and by the gminas of Błonie, Grodzisk Mazowiecki, Michałowice, Nadarzyn and Ożarów Mazowiecki.
