= Moszna-Wieś =

- Village
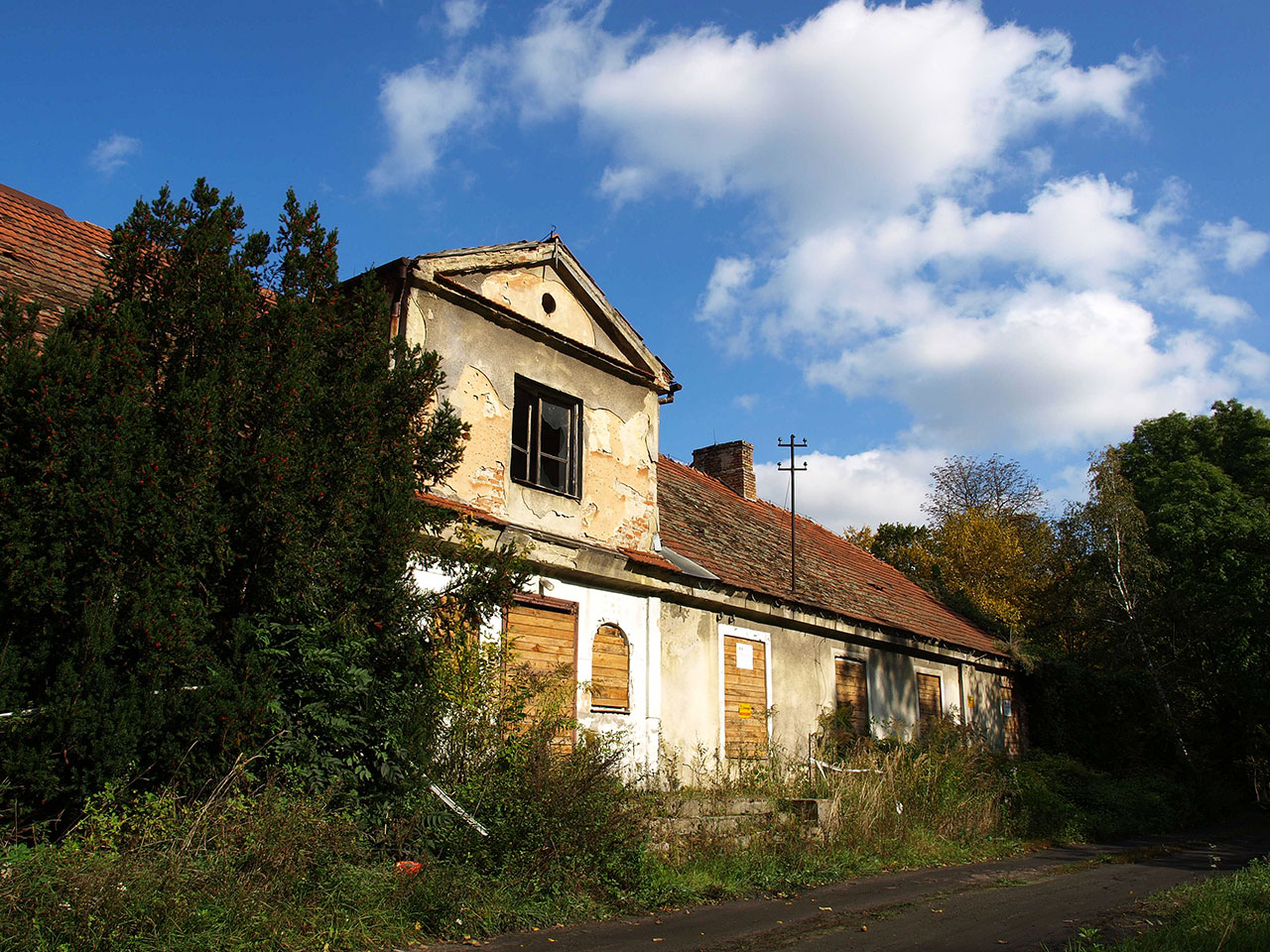
- Old, abandoned villa in Moszna-Wieś

- Location within Poland
- Coordinates: 52°10′51″N 20°45′00″E
- Country: Poland
- Voivodeship: Masovian
- County: Pruszków
- Gmina: Brwinów

Population (approx.)
  - Total: 250

Moszna-Wieś [ˈmɔʂna ˈvjɛɕ] is a village in the administrative district of Gmina Brwinów, within Pruszków County, Masovian Voivodeship, in east-central Poland.
