= Krakowiany, Masovian Voivodeship =

Krakowiany
- Village
- Location within Poland
- Coordinates: 52°01′13″N 20°46′42″E
- Country: Poland
- Voivodeship: Masovian
- County: Pruszków
- Gmina: Nadarzyn

Krakowiany [krakɔˈvjanɨ] is a village in the administrative district of Gmina Nadarzyn, within Pruszków County, Masovian Voivodeship, in east-central Poland.
