= Nadarzyn =

- Village
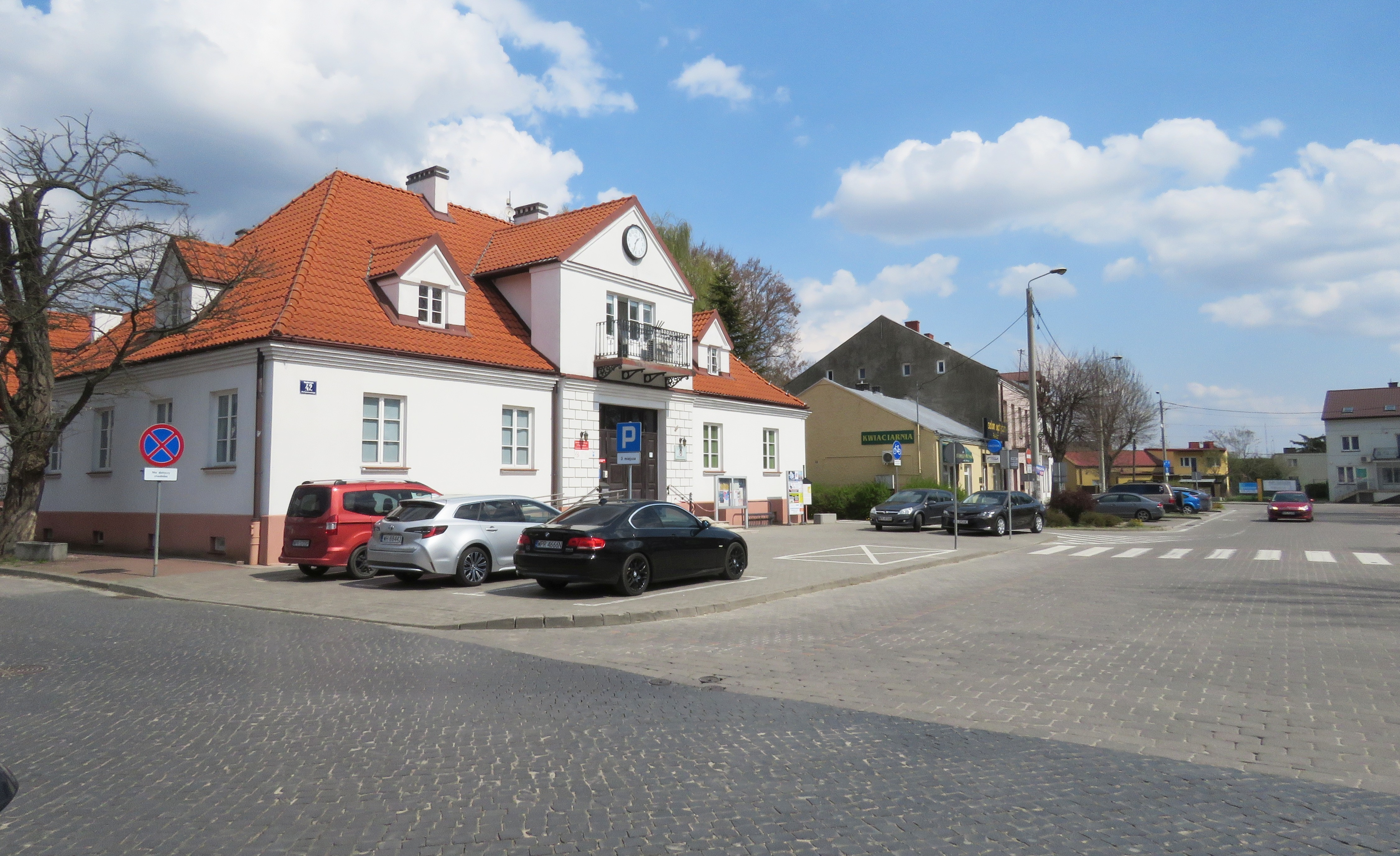
- Main square

- Location within Poland
- Coordinates: 52°5′38″N 20°48′19″E
- Country: Poland
- Voivodeship: Masovian
- County: Pruszków
- Gmina: Nadarzyn
- Population: 4,709

Nadarzyn [naˈdaʐɨn] is a village in Pruszków County, Masovian Voivodeship, in east-central Poland. It is the seat of the gmina (administrative district) called Gmina Nadarzyn.

In 2021, the village had a population of 4709.

== Education ==
- Wyższa Szkoła Fundacji Kultury Informatycznej (College of the Information Culture Foundation)

== International relations ==
=== Twin towns – Sister cities ===
Nadarzyn is twinned with

- Mardakan, Azerbaijan
