= Gmina Nadarzyn =

Gmina Nadarzyn Nadarzyn Commune
- Gmina
- Coat of arms
- Interactive map of Gmina Nadarzyn
- Coordinates (Nadarzyn): 52°5′38″N 20°48′19″E
- Country: Poland
- Voivodeship: Masovian
- County: Pruszków
- Seat: Nadarzyn

Area
  - Total: 73.4 km^{2} (28.3 sq mi)

Population (2006)
  - Total: 10,362
  - Density: 141/km^{2} (366/sq mi)
- Website: http://www.nadarzyn.pl

Gmina Nadarzyn is a rural gmina (administrative district) in Pruszków County, Masovian Voivodeship, in east-central Poland. Its seat is the village of Nadarzyn, which lies approximately 9 kilometres (6 mi) south of Pruszków and 20 km (12 mi) south-west of Warsaw.

The gmina covers an area of 73.4 square kilometres (28.3 sq mi), and as of 2006 its population was 10,362.

== Villages ==
Gmina Nadarzyn contains the villages and settlements of Bieliny, Kajetany, Kostowiec, Krakowiany, Młochów, Nadarzyn, Parole, Rozalin, Rusiec, Stara Wieś, Strzeniówka, Szamoty, Urzut, Walendów, Wola Krakowiańska, Wolica and Żabieniec.

== Neighbouring gminas ==
Gmina Nadarzyn is bordered by the gminas of Brwinów, Grodzisk Mazowiecki, Lesznowola, Michałowice, Raszyn, Tarczyn and Żabia Wola.
