= Parole, Poland =

Parole
- Village
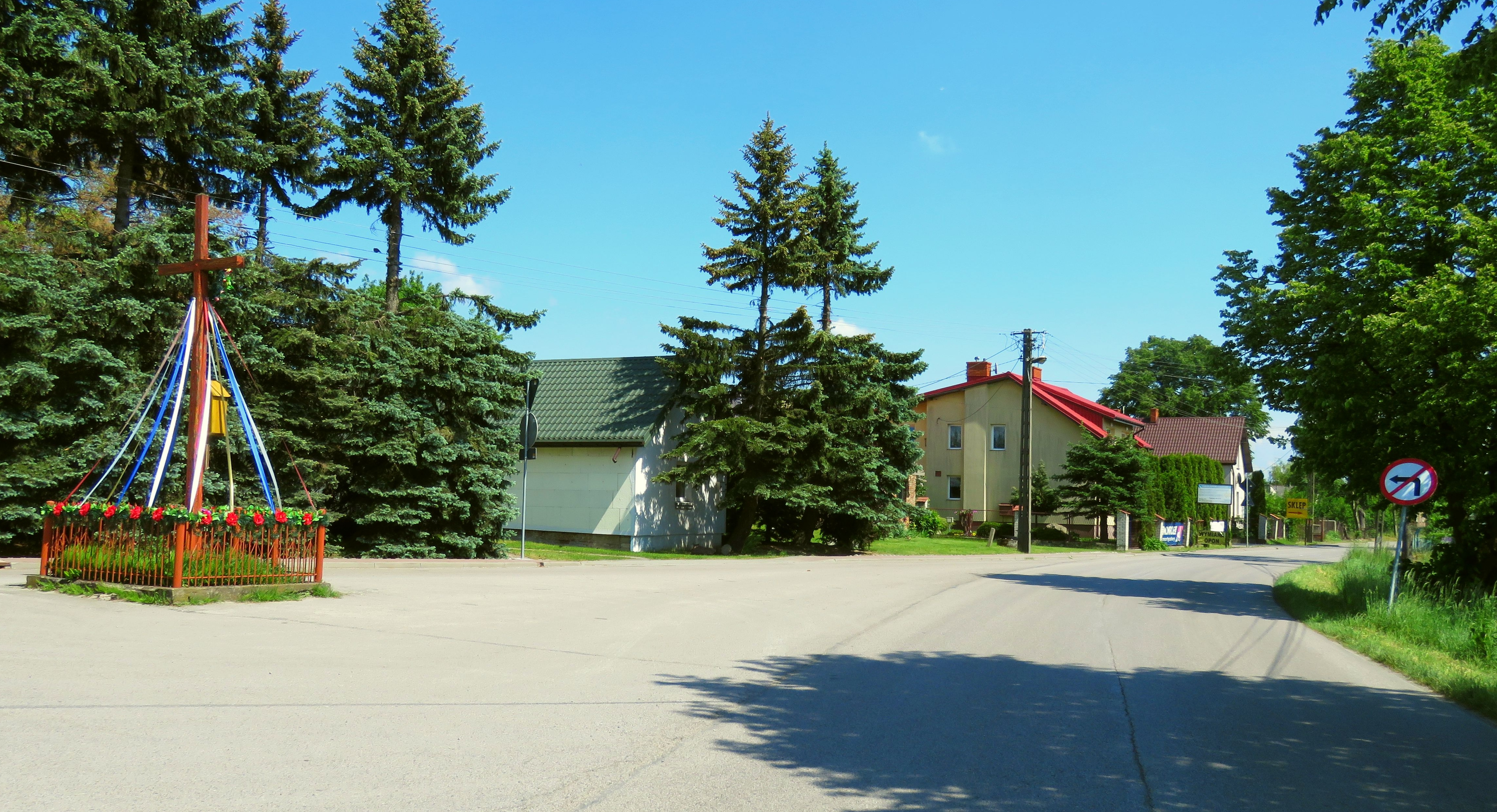

- Location within Poland
- Coordinates: 52°2′N 20°49′E
- Country: Poland
- Voivodeship: Masovian
- County: Pruszków
- Gmina: Nadarzyn

Parole [paˈrɔlɛ] is a village in the administrative district of Gmina Nadarzyn, within Pruszków County, Masovian Voivodeship, in east-central Poland.
