= Brwinów =

Garden city in Poland

- Garden city
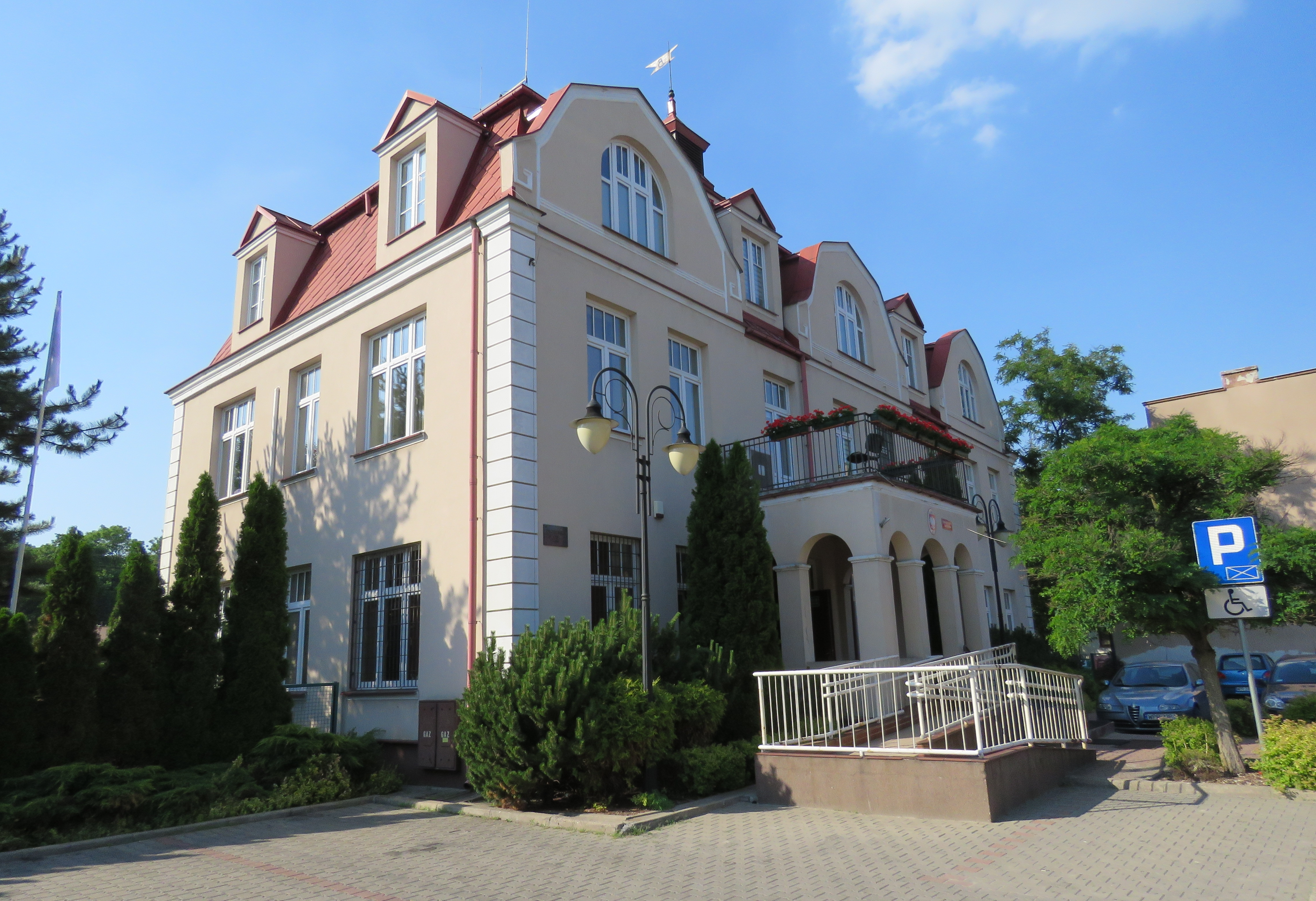
- Town Hall

- Coat of arms

- Location within Poland
- Coordinates: 52°8′30″N 20°43′0″E
- Country: Poland
- Voivodeship: Masovian
- County: Pruszków
- Gmina: Brwinów
- Established: 15th century
- Town rights: 1950

Government
  - Mayor: Arkadiusz Kosiński

Area
  - Total: 10.06 km^{2} (3.88 sq mi)

Population (31 December 2021)
  - Total: 13,718
  - Density: 1,364/km^{2} (3,532/sq mi)
- Time zone: UTC+1 (CET)
  - Summer (DST): UTC+2 (CEST)
- Postal code: 05-840
- Area code: +48 22
- Website: brwinow.pl

Brwinów [ˈbrvʲinuf] is a town in Pruszków County, Masovian Voivodeship, Poland, about 25 km (16 mi) from the centre of Warsaw. As of December 2021, the town has a population of 13,718.

== Geography ==
The town is located on the Łowicz–Błonie plains.

== History ==
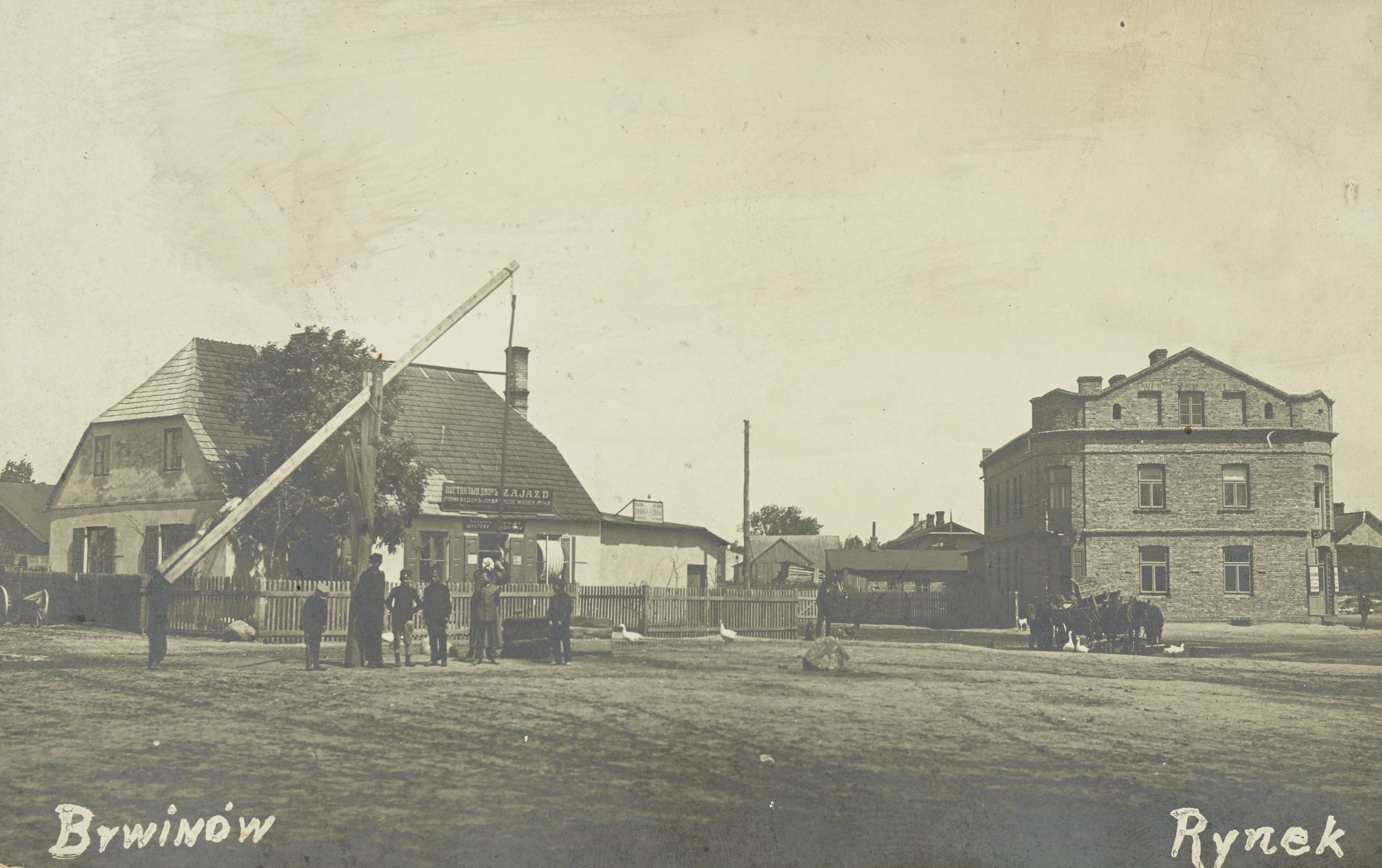
Brwinów before 1906

Brwinów was a possession of the Radziwiłł family, and then of Primate of Poland Mikołaj Prażmowski, and of Polish General Kazimierz Dziekoński. In 1861, the estate was purchased by Polish industrialist Stanisław Lilpop.

Until 1954, Brwinów was the location of the Helenów parish council and between 1917 and 1949 it was also Letnisko-Brwinów's major town.

During the German ccupation of Poland (World War II), in 1943, local Poles took in a number of kidnapped Polish children from the Zamość region, which were either bought out or secretly taken off German trains.

Between 1975 and 1998, Brwinów belonged to Warsaw Voivodeship.

== Sports ==
On 13 April 2014, there was a Warsaw Eagles – Angels Toruń exhibition football game.

== Transport ==
Brwinów is served by the Brwinów railway station.

== Famous people ==
- Leszek Engelking, poet, translator
- Henryk Waniek, painter
- Wacław Kowalski, actor
- Bolesław Hryniewiecki, naturalist
- Jerzy Hryniewiecki, architect
- Jarosław Iwaszkiewicz, writer, poet
- Aleksander Werner, painter, sculptor

== Demography ==
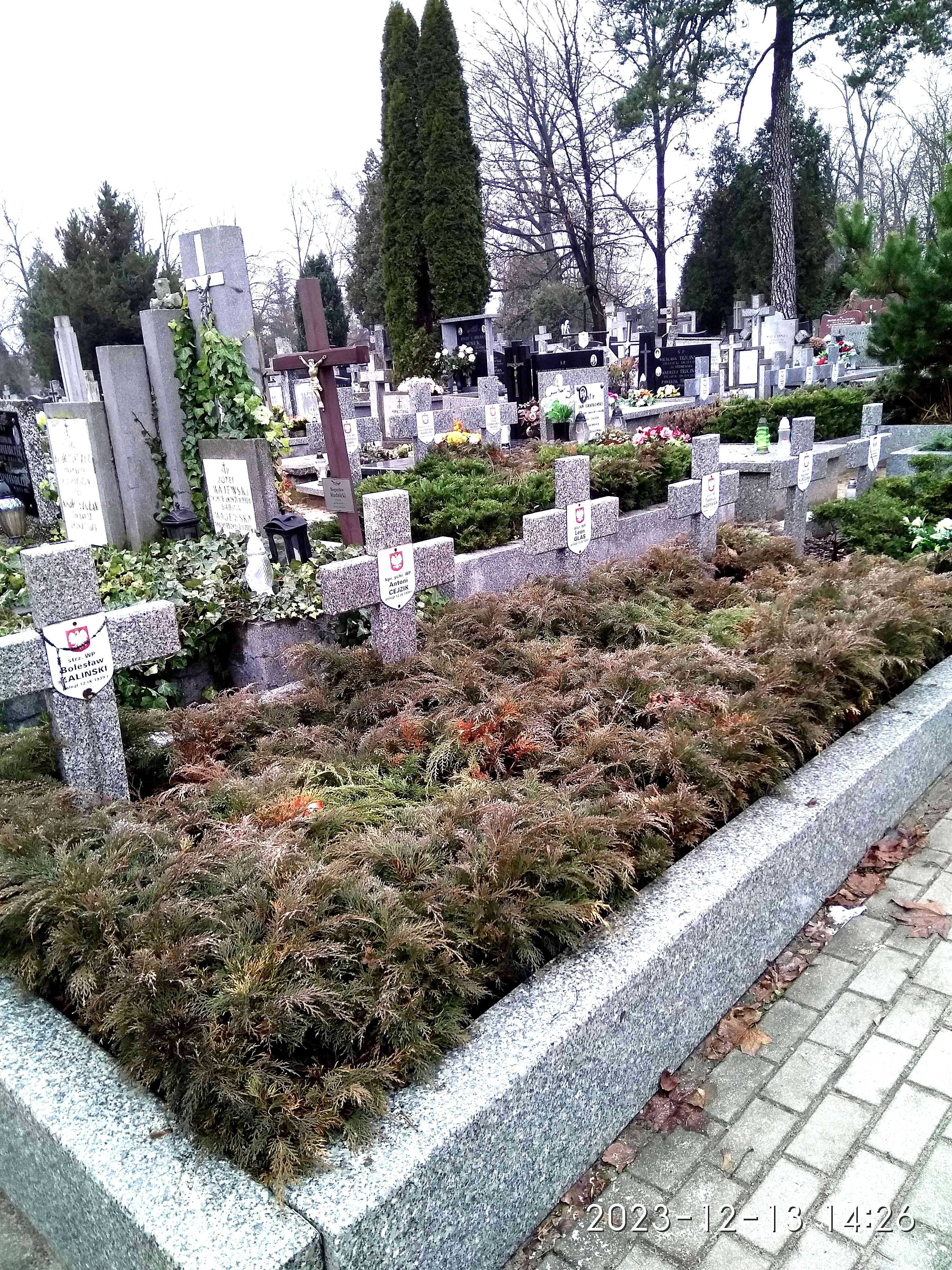
Brwinów Cemetery – The Section of The Polish Army Soldiers – "The Academic Legion", killed during The Second World War (The Battle near Brwinów), 1939
