= Czubin =

- Village
- Location within Poland
- Coordinates: 52°10′N 20°40′E
- Country: Poland
- Voivodeship: Masovian
- County: Pruszków
- Gmina: Brwinów

Czubin [ˈt͡ʂubin] is a village in the administrative district of Gmina Brwinów, within Pruszków County, Masovian Voivodeship, in east-central Poland.
