= Pruszków County =

Pruszków County Powiat pruszkowski
- County
- Flag Coat of arms

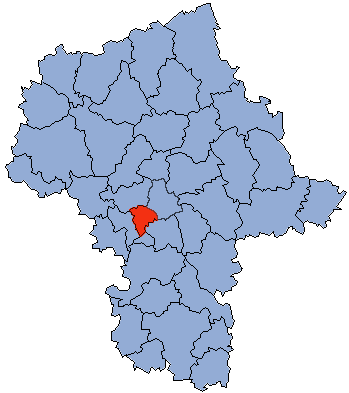
- Location within the voivodeship

- Division into gminas
- Coordinates (Pruszków): 52°10′N 20°48′E
- Country: Poland
- Voivodeship: Masovian
- Seat: Pruszków
- Gminas: Total 6 (incl. 2 urban): Piastów; Pruszków; Gmina Brwinów; Gmina Michałowice; Gmina Nadarzyn; Gmina Raszyn

Area
  - Total: 246.31 km^{2} (95.10 sq mi)

Population (2019)
  - Total: 165,039
  - Density: 670.05/km^{2} (1,735.4/sq mi)
  - Urban: 98,296
  - Rural: 66,743
- Car plates: WPR
- Website: www.powiat.pruszkow.pl

Pruszków County (Polish: powiat pruszkowski) is a unit of territorial administration and local government (powiat) in Masovian Voivodeship, east-central Poland. It came into being on January 1, 1999, as a result of the Polish local government reforms passed in 1998. Its administrative seat and largest town is Pruszków, which lies 15 kilometres (9 mi) west of Warsaw. The county also contains the towns of Piastów, lying 4 km (2 mi) north-east of Pruszków, and Brwinów, 7 km (4 mi) south-west of Pruszków.

The county covers an area of 246.31 square kilometres (95.1 sq mi). As of 2019 its total population is 165,039, out of which the population of Pruszków is 62,076, that of Piastów is 22,619, that of Brwinów is 13,601, and the rural population is 66,743.

== Neighbouring counties ==
Pruszków County is bordered by Warsaw West County to the north, the city of Warsaw to the east, Piaseczno County to the south-east and Grodzisk County to the west.

== Administrative divisions ==
The county is subdivided into six gminas (two urban, one urban-rural and three rural). These are listed in the following table, in descending order of population.

Gmina	Type	Area (km^{2})	Population (2019)	Seat
Pruszków	urban	19.2	62,076	
Gmina Brwinów	urban-rural	69.2	26,543	Brwinów
Piastów	urban	5.8	22,619	
Gmina Raszyn	rural	43.9	21,776	Raszyn
Gmina Michałowice	rural	34.9	18,209	Michałowice
Gmina Nadarzyn	rural	73.4	13,816	Nadarzyn
