= Jasiński =

Jasiński (feminine: Jasińska; plural: Jasińscy) is a Polish surname (Cognates include — Belarusian: Ясінскі Jasínski, Russian: Ясинский Jasínskij, Ukrainian: Ясинський Jasýnsʹkyj, Ясінський Jasínsʹkyj). Notable people with the surname include:

- Andrzej Jasiński (born 1936), Polish pianist
- Daniel Jasinski (born 1989), German discus thrower
- Edyta Jasińska (born 1986), Polish cyclist
- Gabriela Jasińska (born 1992), Polish volleyball player
- Jakub Jasiński (1761–1794), Polish military officer and poet
- Janusz Jasiński (1928–2026), Polish historian
- Julian Jasinski (born 1996), German basketball player
- Kazimierz Jasiński (1946–2012), Polish cyclist
- Krzysztof Jasinski (born 1943), Polish theater and film actor and director
- Małgorzata Jasińska (born 1984), Polish cyclist
- Marceli Jasiński (died 1867), Polish composer
- Mirosław Jasiński (born 1960), Polish film director, screenwriter, official, diplomat
- Radosław Jasiński (born 1971), Polish footballer
- Roman Jasinski (1907–1991), principal dancer at Ballet Russe de Monte Carlo, founder of The Tulsa Ballet.
- Stanisław Jasiński and Emilia Słodkowska-Jasiński, Righteous among the Nations.
- Tadeusz Jasiński (born 1951), Polish historian
- Tomasz Jasiński (disambiguation)
- Urszula Jasińska (born 1983), Polish athlete
- Wojciech Jasiński (born 1948), Polish politician

== See also ==
- Jashinski (Katherine Jashinski)
- Jashinsky (Emily Jashinsky)
- Jasinsky (Aaron Jasinsky,Trevor Jasinsky)
- Yashinski (Allan Yashinski)
- Yashinsky (Mark Yashinsky, Michael Yashinsky)
- Yasinski (Ihar Yasinski)
- Yasinsky (Doug Yasinsky)
- Yasynskiy (Anton Yasynskiy)
