= Marceli Tarczewski =

Polish lawyer, official, and attorney (1782–1843)

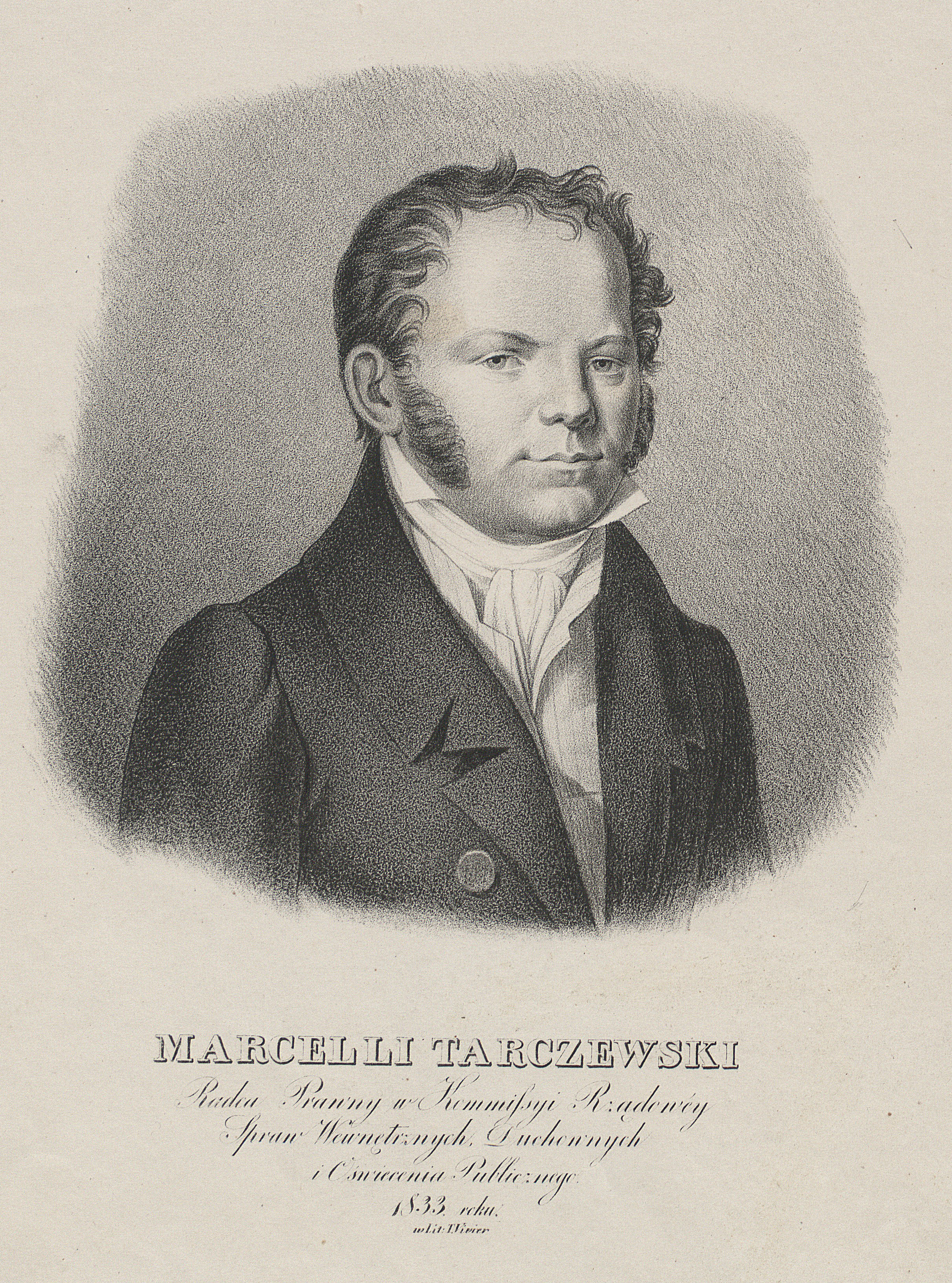
- Born: 18 June 1782; Ciućkowo
- Died: 30 August 1843 (aged 61); Warsaw
- Citizenship: Polish
- Education: Albertina University of Königsberg
- Occupation: lawyer
- Spouse(s): Aleksandra née Tańska (m. 1816–1843, his death)

Marek Marceli Józef Jan Chrzciciel Tarczewski (18 June 1782 – 30 August 1843) was a Polish lawyer, official and attorney who defended Polish conspirators, as well as publisher and freemason.

He graduated in law from the Albertina University of Königsberg, and became an assessor at the Civil Tribunal, and then a sub-prosecutor at the Court of Appeal of the Duchy of Warsaw. After the establishment of the Congress Poland in 1815, he started a legal practice and participated in the trials at the cassation Supreme Court as a legal representative.

In political trials, he defended Polish conspirators who acted against Russian domination in the Congress Poland. In the first trial of the Patriotic Society, Tarczewski defended Mikołaj Dobrzycki. In the second trial, he was a representative of Stanisław Sołtyk, the president of the Patriotic Society, and made Sołtyk was given pardon. His speeches and pleadings were printed and publicized. In 1820s, he was a member of the Governmental Committee of Internal Affairs and Police of the Kingdom of Poland.

Together with his wife Aleksandra née Tańska, he ran a popular salon in Warsaw.

At the end of the November Uprising he was a candidate for the Minister of Justice in the National Government. He refused to accept the position.

== Biography ==
He was born in 1782, coming from middle nobility. His father, Maciej Tarczewski, was a burgrave of the town Wyszogród, leaseholder of the villages Kadłubowo, Żochów and Żochówka, and died around 1790, survived by his wife, Józefa née Tańska (who died only after 1830), the mother of Marceli. Marceli was the nephew of writer Ignacy Tański. He had a younger sister, Dominika Józefa Cyryla (c. 1783 – after 1821), the wife of Grzegorz Domański (a laborer and former soldier); and brothers Bruno Placyd Franciszek (born 1786) and Ferdynand (1788–1827), owner of Masłomiąca. After the death of Maciej Tarczewski, Marceli's mother Józefa married Wincenty Ferreriusz Kraszewski (c. 1752–1830), the ensign of the National Cavalry.

Marceli Tarczewski graduated in law from the Albertina University of Königsberg in 1805, and came back to Warsaw, where in 1809 he was appointed an assessor at the Civil Tribunal of the First Instance of the Warsaw Department of the Duchy of Warsaw (Trybunał Cywilny I Instancji Departamentu Warszawskiego). On 13 August 1812 he passed the judge's exam before the Supreme Examination Commission and since then served as the sub-prosecutor of the Court of Appeal. From 1811 he was a member of the masonic lodge Temple of Izis (Świątynia Izys).

After the establishment of the Congress Poland in 1815, Tarczewski changed his activity to legal practice. In 1816 he became a legal representative at the Supreme Court (Sąd Najwyższej Instancji), participating in trials as a representative of aristocratic families.

From 1818 until 1830 he was a plenipotent of the Tax Department (Wydział Skarbowy) and the Treasury Department (Kasa) of the Municipal Office (Urząd Municypalny) of the capital city of Warsaw. From 1823 until 1830 he was an assessor at the General Council for Monitoring Hospitals (Rada Ogólna Dozorcza Szpitali). As a member of the Governmental Committee of Internal Affairs and Police (Komisja Rządowa Spraw Wewnętrznych i Policji) of the Congress Poland, he was active in the City Committee (Komisja Miast) and was also a legal advisor in the General Secretariat (Sekretariat Generalny, 1824–1830).

In 1820, together with Jan Olrych Szaniecki, he made an unsuccessful attempt to establish an agricultural and commercial association in Pińczów. The project of this organization later became the prototype of the Land Credit Society (Towarzystwo Kredytowe Ziemskie) established by Franciszek Ksawery Drucki-Lubecki.

In 1826, acting on behalf of Aniela Paulina Popławska, the illegitimate daughter of banker Maciej Łyszkiewicz, Tarczewski won the trial to drop Łyszkiewicz. In 1827 he participated in the trial to take over the part of the Pińczów Ordinance on the behalf of Jan Olrych Szaniecki.

In the spring of 1827 Tarczewski found himself among the founders of the publishing company A. Gałęzowski Printing House and Company (Drukarnia A. Gałęzowskiego i Kompania). The printing house issued one hundred and sixteen items within ten years, including the series of Polish Writers' Library (nineteen volumes) and the Themis legal magazine.

In May 1827, Tarczewski bought the indebted estates of Komorów and Sokołów, with the foundation privileges of the parish in Pęcice, from Ignacy Sobolewski, the Minister of Justice of the Kingdom of Poland.

Tarczewski was a representative in political processes, defending Polish conspirators who were against Russian domination. In the first trial of the Patriotic Society, Tarczewski defended Mikołaj Dobrzycki. In the second trial, ran on the forum of the Sejm, he was a defender of the president of the Patriotic Society, Stanisław Sołtyk. For firm statements in this trial, Tarczewski was punished with a reprimand, accused of the offence of prosecutor Onufry Wyczechowski. Nevertheless, as a defender, he proved effective; he pointed to numerous formal failures, and in effect obtained an acquittal, approved at the beginning of 1829 by Tsar Nicholas I. The speeches of Tarczewski were published in the Collection of Speeches and Documents of the Sejm Process (Zbiór mów i dokumentów procesu sejmowego, 1828).

Tarczewski was a deputy censor in the Warsaw Savings Society (Towarzystwo Oszczędności) from 1828 until 1830 .

After the outbreak of the November Uprising, on 29 December 1830, dictator Józef Chłopicki appointed Tarczewski to a commission that was to recognize documents concerning people suspected of spying. The head of the commission was castellan Michał Potocki. The commission operated until 12 March 1831. Shortly before the capitulation of Warsaw, on the evening of 7 September 1831, after the dismissal of General Jan Krukowiecki from the position of the President of the National Government, Tarczewski refused to take the post of Minister of Justice in the government of Bonawentura Niemojowski.

On 24 May 1833 he was appointed by the Administrative Council as a member of the Main Council of the Welfare of Charitable Institutions (Rada Główna Opiekuńcza Instytutów Dobroczynnych). He held this position for the next decade, until his death in 1843. From 1835, he headed the Legal Section in the Government Commission of Internal and Spiritual Affairs (Komisja Rządowa Spraw Wewnętrznych i Duchownych).

In 1836, he was suspected of selling illegal prints from A. Gałęzowski Printing House and sending the money he received from this title to his brother-in-law, Karol Boromeusz Hoffman, who was staying in exile. He was therefore questioned by Russian authorities and in 1837 he was under police surveillance. A. Gałęzowski Printing House was closed.

Tarczewski was the co-author of the Regulations in Force When Carrying Out Court Medical Investigations on Corpses (Przepisy obowiązujące przy wykonaniu sądowo lekarskich dochodzeń na trupach , 1840). In 1841, he proved himself noble in the Kingdom of Poland. After the liquidation of the Supreme Court in 1842, he became a legal representative at the Warsaw Departments of the Governing Senate. In the years 1842–1843, he had a dispute with the parish priest W. Litwinowicz about church lands.

Tarczewski was married to his cousin Aleksandra née Tańska (1792–1850), the daughter of Ignacy Tański and Marianna née Czempińska, contributor to magazine Rozrywki dla Dzieci (Entertainment for Children), co-founder of the Union of Patriotic Charity of the Varsovian (Związek Dobroczynności Patriotycznej Warszawianek) during the November Uprising. Their wedding, which took place on 17 September 1816, was a subject of Bogna Wernichowska's popular book on „memorable weddings” of Polish nobility (1990). Aleksandra Tańska, like her sister Klementyna, has been writing a memoir, which was published as The Story of My Life. Memories of a Varsovian (Historia mego życia. Wspomnienia warszawianki) by Ossolineum in 1967, more than one hundred years after Tańska's death.

Together with his wife Tarczewski ran a popular salon in Warsaw. His sister-in-law, Klementyna Hoffmanowa, issued a high grade for his moral stance.

Marceli and Aleksandra Tarczewscy had twelve children (of whom more than half died in childhood or early youth): Ignacy Juliusz (1818–1819), Władysław Wojciech Jozafat (born 1819), Helena Katarzyna (1820–1845), the wife of Aleksander Radwan, real state councilor; Kazimierz Maciej (1822–1872), an official of the Bank of Poland; Gustaw Jan (1822 – after 1864), a staff cavalry master of the Russian army who was the organizer of the uprising in Biała Podlaska, for which he was sent to exile; Maria Stefania (born in 1823), married to Józef Konstanty Grodzicki; Marcjana Stanisław Jana de Matha (born 1825); Ignacy Onufry Antoni (1826–1829); Maria Regina (1826–1827); Maria Klementyna (1828–1828); Aleksandra Wincent (1830–1836) and Adam Jan Hieronim (1832–1833). Marceli Tarczewski also brought up his younger stepbrother, Jan Kraszewski.

Tarczewski died in Warsaw on 31 August 1843. He was buried two days later, on 2 September at the cemetery in Pęcice.

Aleksandra Tarczewska as a widow became a lifetime owner of the Komorow estate, which after her death was auctioned.

== Awards ==
- Order of Saint Anna (1836, 3rd class);
- Order of Saint Vladimir (1838, 4th class);
- Order of Saint Stanislaus (1841, 2nd class).

== Bibliography ==
- Saski, Jerzy (1983). "Marceli Tarczewski". In Łyczywek, Roman (ed.). Słownik biograficzny adwokatów polskich. Vol. 1. Warszawa: Wydawnictwo Prawnicze.
