= Battle of Pęcice =

Coordinates: 52.157032°N 20.848489°E

The Battle of Pęcice took place on 2 August 1944 between military units of Armia Krajowa, belonging to the 4th Ochota Sub-district, and the German military during the Warsaw Uprising in Poland during World War II.

== Course of the engagement ==
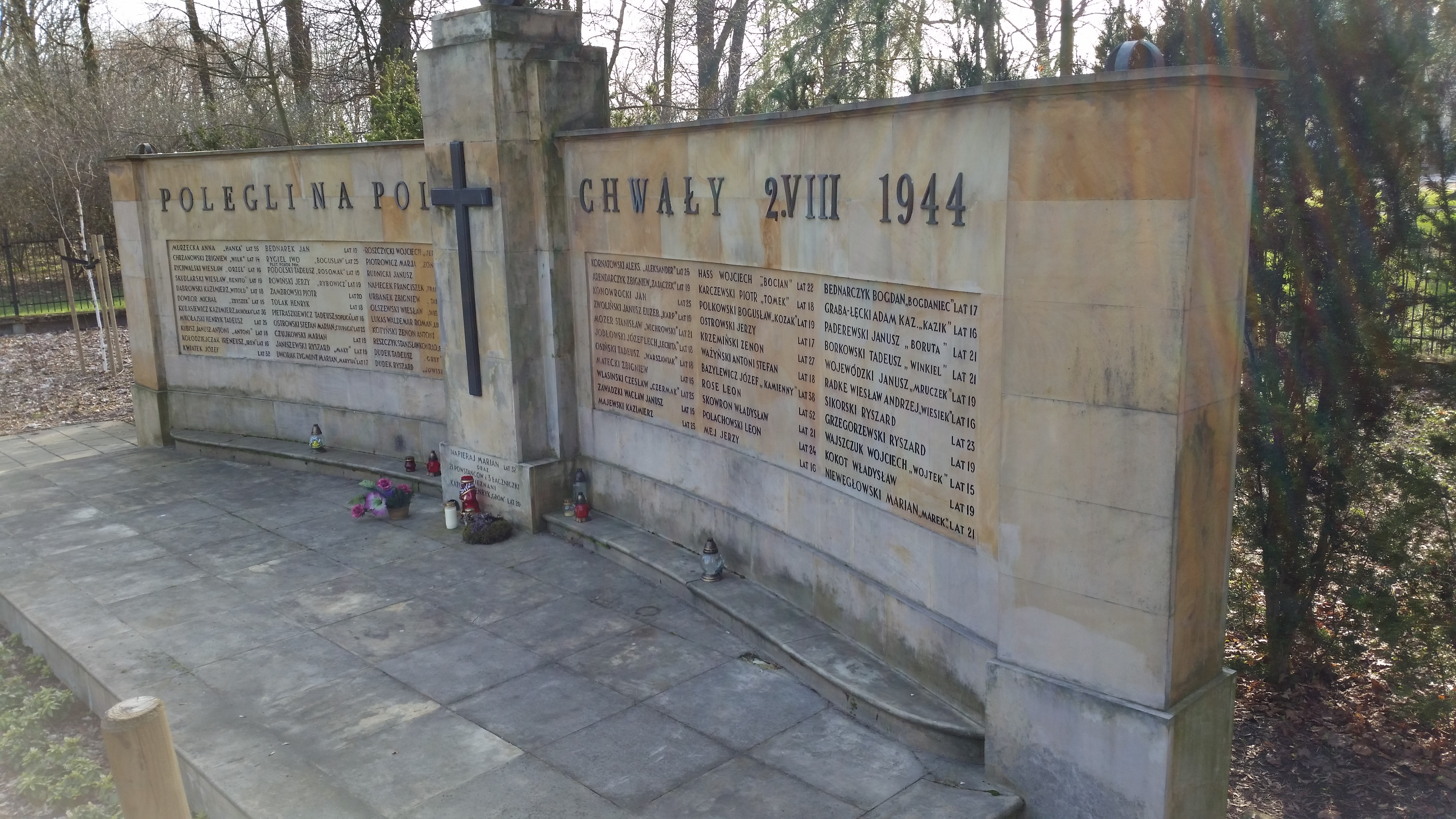
Monument to Poles killed during the fighting on 2 August 1944

After heavy fighting on the first day of the Warsaw Uprising, during the evening of 1–2 August 1944, the majority of military units of the 4th Ochota Sub-district, commanded by Lieutenant Colonel Mieczysław Sokołowski (pseudonym Grzymała) began to withdraw from Ochota in the direction of Sękocin and Chojnowo forests. At 5 a.m on 2 August, the concentrated units set off from the region of Reguły village via Pęcice in the direction of the forests. German military units were stationed in the manor-house of Pęcice.

The distance from Reguły to Pęcice amounted to about 2 km. The terrain was unfavourable from an operational point of view for the insurgents, as the march required them to advance along 1 km of road up a slope to Pęcice, followed by a 1 km section of the way leading on a dike along a broad, occasionally wet meadow.

The German defenders possessed good observation and fields of fire which gave them an advantage over the approaching Polish units. As the Polish units advanced along the dike, cars appeared with German troops. A fight ensued, the sounds of which alarmed the German units stationed in the Pęcice manor-house. The well-placed and well-ranged German units struck the column of insurgent units with well-aimed machine-gun fire. The column of insurgent units divided itself in two parts: the advance party including three scout platoons attacking along the road and engaging the main German force, and the main element of the insurgent force, which, under cover of that attack, by-passed Pęcice from the right side and reached the Sękociny forests and then the Chojnowo forests. The units attacking Pęcice directly suffered heavy losses with many casualties and prisoners.

On 2 August, the Germans executed sixty of the insurgents who had been captured in the brick-yard in Pęcice.
