= Ochota Subdistrict (Home Army) =

The Sub-district I of Ochota (of Armia Krajowa) (Polish: Obwód IV Ochota) – one of territorial organisational units of the Warsaw District (Armia Krajowa) (Pol.: Okręg Warszawa Armii Krajowej), which operated during the German occupation of Poland 1939–1945. It comprised the area of the Ochota district of the city of Warsaw.

== Period of conspiracy activity ==
Conspiracy activities in Ochota began in the end of 1939. They were organised by lieutenant Zygmunt Żółtkowski pseudonym "Odwet" ("Revenge"), who acted in the framework of the Służba Zwycięstwu Polski organisation (later renamed into the Armia Krajowa - Home Army).

The formation of first units of the line was commenced in May and June 1940. Two platoons were created, each of them c. 30 people. The command of the 1st one was taken by second lieutenant Witold Daab pseudonym "Stefan" (Stephan), while the commandment of the 2nd one was taken by second lieutenant Stanisław Chabros pseudonym "Dybowski". The 3rd platoon was formed in the mid 1941. It comprised c. 30 people commanded by lieutenant Józef Stępkowski.

Since mid-1941, due to recruitment carried by the Związek Walki Zbrojnej, a quick increase of the effective strength of the units took place, as well as by inclusion of military groups of other organisations struggling for Poland's independence.

== Organisation status in the eve of the Warsaw Uprising 1944 ==
In summer 1944 the staff of the Area was composed of:

- Commander – lieutenant-colonel Mieczysław Sokołowski pseudonym "Grzymała";
- Commander's deputy and chief of staff – major Zenon Bayer pseudonym "Zenon";
- Quartermaster – second lieutenant Michał Karwacki pseudonym "Sowa";

The Area of Ochota included 3 regions (Pol.: rejon):

- Region I – commanded by captain Tadeusz Jasiński pseudonym "Zych";
- Region II – commanded by captain Eugeniusz Kosiacki pseudonym "Korczak";
- Region III – commanded by lieutenant Andrzej Chyczewski pseudonym "Gustaw".

The military strength of the Area was composed of c. 30 platoons organised into concentrations (groupings), battalions and companies. The effective strength of the Area amounted to c. 1,500 soldiers. The Area included also the Women Military Service (Pol.: Wojskowa Służba Kobiet) which amounted to c. 400 persons in sanitary and liaison units.

== Tasks assigned in case of uprising ==
In case of uprising, the military units of the Area of Ochota ought to conquer the following:

- barracks located in the Students' Hostel in Plac Gabriela Narutowicza, manned by c. 350 policemen of the Schutzpolizei;
- barracks in the buildings of the Academy of Polytechnical Sciences (Pol.: Akademia Nauk Politechnicznych) and the Chief Office of State-owned Forests (Pol.: Dyrekcja Lasów Państwowych), where a company of SS was stationed, c. 150 soldiers strong.

The insurgent units were also to close and keep control of transit roads in that city district, thus covering Warsaw from south-east.

== Course of combat in Warsaw Uprising of 1944 ==
On 1 August c. 600 soldiers turned up on places of concentration. Also, not the whole warfare to be in disposal of the Area's units arrived on place in time. In the face of a large advantage of the enemy in number and firepower as well as the loss of an opportunity to surprise the enemy, attacks taken up at the Hour "W" were not successful. Most of the units were withdrawn outside Warsaw.

On 2 August the Battle of Pęcice was fought, in which c. 100 soldiers fell. Then the units withdrew to a concentration place in Chojnowo forests.

Units, which remained in Ochota, assumed defence and created two redoubts:

- '"Wawel Redoubt" (Pol.: Reduta Wawelska) – in a quadrangle of blocks in the streets: Wawelska, Mianowskiego and Uniwersytecka - commanded by second lieutenant Jerzy Gołębiowski pseudonym "Stach";
- "Kalisz Redoubt" (Pol.: Reduta Kaliska) – in the complex of buildings of the State-owned Tobacco Monopoly (Pol.: Państwowy Monopol Tytoniowy) and adjacent buildings - commanded by lieutenant Andrzej Chuczewski pseudonym "Gustaw".

The Wawel group bore in its positions until 11 August, when - in face of lack of ammunition and possibility to continue combat - withdrew through underground drains into southern part of Śródmieście district of Warsaw. There it was included into the "Iwo" reserve battalion and took part in its military actions. Since the beginning of September, as part of the "Odstoja" battalion, it repelled Germans advancing along Aleje Jerozolimskie. There it endured until the capitulation of the Warsaw Uprising.

The Kalisz group fought in the region of Kaliska and Barska streets. It kept its positions until 10 August, when, having used up all possibilities to continue combat, withdrew to a concentration place in Chojnowo forests. After reorganisation and replacements, the unit commanded by lieutenant "Stach" returned to Warsaw and took part in combats in Wilanów, in Sadyba, in Czerniaków and in Mokotów until the end of the Warsaw Uprising.

One of chaplains was Jan Salamucha.

== See also ==
- Military description of the Warsaw Uprising
