= Karol Boromeusz Hoffman =

Polish political writer, historian, lawyer, and publisher (1798–1875)

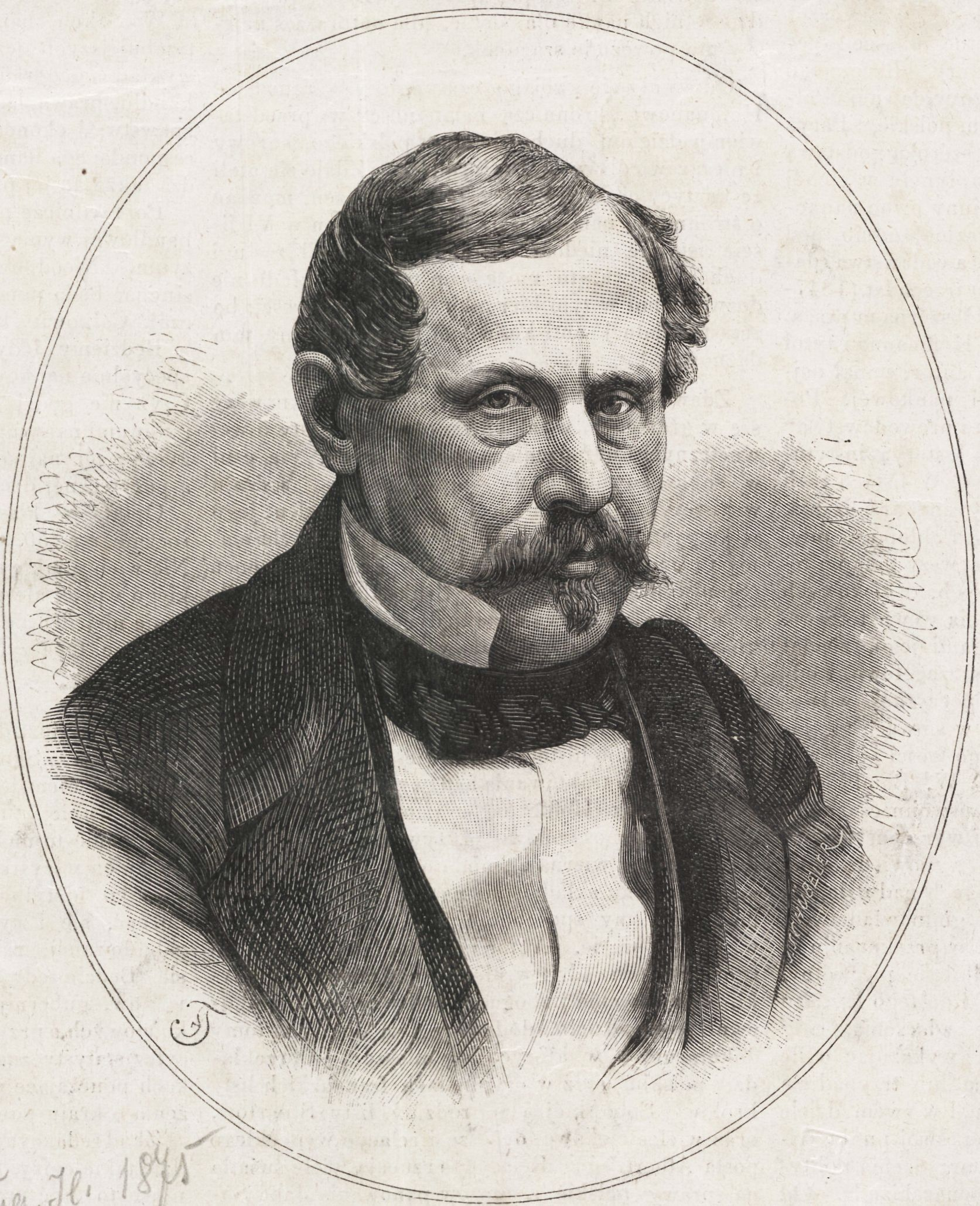
- Born: 1798; Jabłonna
- Died: 6 July 1875 (aged 76–77); Blasewitz
- Occupations: political writer historian lawyer publisher
- Spouse(s): Klementyna née Tańska (m. 1829–1845, her death)

Karol Aleksander Boromeusz Hoffman (1798 – 6 July 1875) was a Polish political writer, historian, lawyer and publisher.

== Biography ==
From 1828 he was a counselor, and from 1830 one of the directors of Bank Polski. In the years 1828–1830, together with Marceli Tarczewski, he published the legal magazine Themis Polska in Warsaw. In 1829 he married Klementyna Tańska. He participated in the November uprising, and after its fall he settled in Paris in 1832. In the exile, he belonged to Hôtel Lambert, the monarchist conservative-liberal party of Prince Adam Jerzy Czartoryski. From 1837 until 1839 he edited The Chronicle of Polish Emigration. After the death of Klementyna, he married Matylda Dunin-Wąsowicz. In 1848 he moved to Dresden, from where he wrote correspondence to Kraków's daily Czas ('Time'), and was a member of the Polish Emigration Committee (Komitet Emigracji Polskiej). In 1869 Poznań Society of Friends of Learning awarded him with an honorary membership. From 1873, he was also a correspondent member of the Academy of Learning.

== Works ==
He published works on the November Uprising and a collection of materials about the Great Emigration, Polish Vademecum (1839). In his historical works, he opposed democratic-republican contemporaries. He saw the specifics of the Polish historical process in the underdevelopment of cities and the weakness of royal power.

- Wielki tydzień Polaków (The Great Week of Poles, 1830, new issue 1915, translated into German, French and Swedish)
- Rzut oka na stan polityczny Królestwa Polskiego od 1815 do 1830 (A Glance at the Political State of the Kingdom of Poland from 1815 to 1830, 1831)
- Cztery powstania (The Four Insurrections, 1837)
- Król wygnaniec (King of the Exile, about Stanisław Leszczyński, 1854, second edition 1861)
- Historia reform politycznych w dawnej Polsce (The History of Political Reforms in Old Poland, 1867 and 1869)
- O panslawizmie zachodnim (On the Western Pan-Slavism, 1868)
- O rządzie skarbu publicznego w dawnej Polsce (On Managing Public Treasury in Old Poland)
- Obraz rządu i prawodawstwa dawnej Polski (An Image of the Government and Legislation of Old Poland)
- Upadek domu Sobieskich (The Fall of the House Sobieski)
- Przyczyny podziału monarchii polskiej po Bolesławie Krzywoustym (The Reasons for the Division of the Polish Monarchy after Bolesław Krzywousty)
