= Gmina Michałowice =

Gmina Michałowice may refer to either of the following rural administrative districts in Poland:

- Gmina Michałowice, Lesser Poland Voivodeship
- Gmina Michałowice, Masovian Voivodeship
