= Pęcice Małe =

- Village
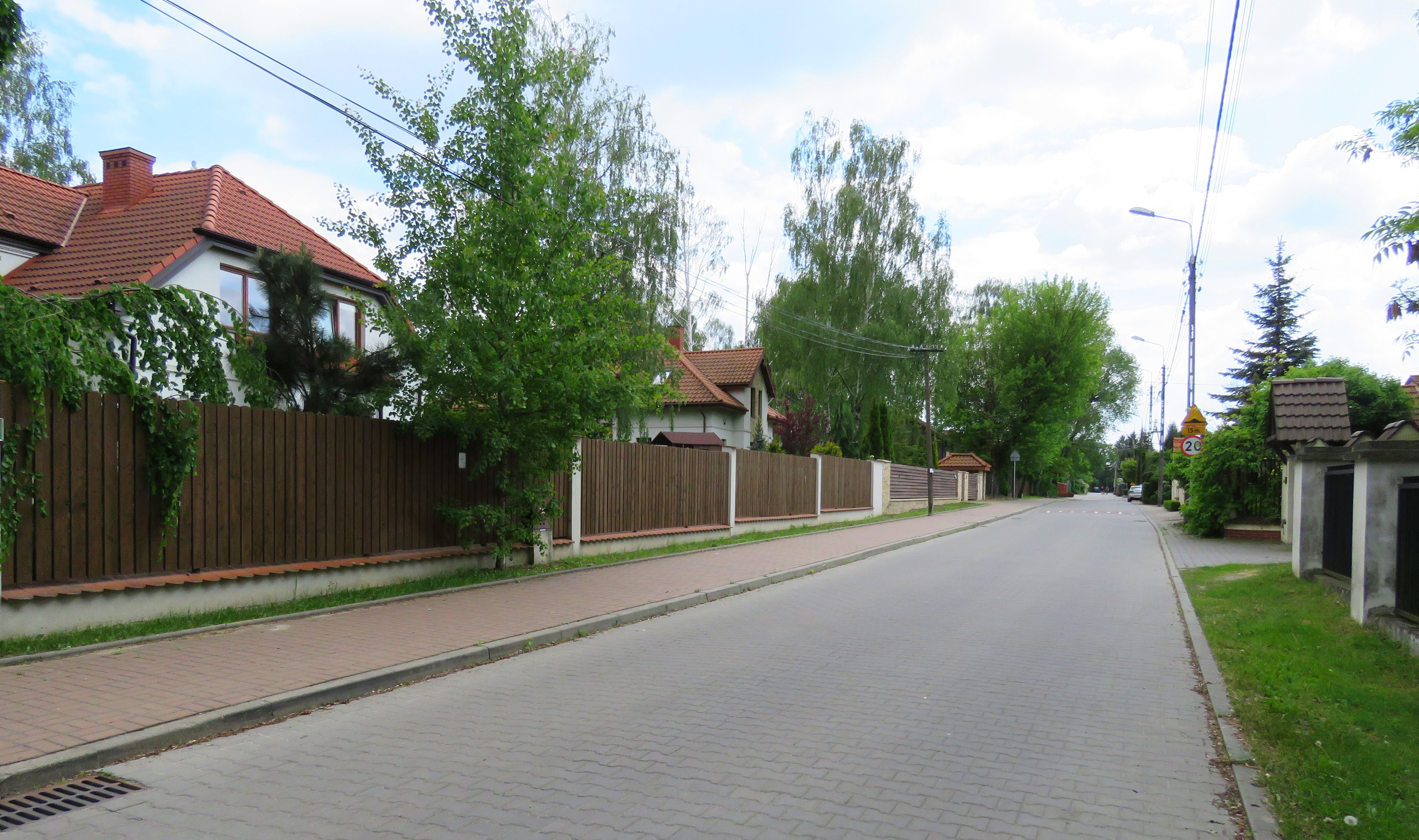

- Location within Poland
- Coordinates: 52°8′38″N 20°50′11″E
- Country: Poland
- Voivodeship: Masovian
- County: Pruszków
- Gmina: Michałowice

Population
  - Total: 580
- Time zone: UTC+1 (CET)
  - Summer (DST): UTC+2 (CEST)
- Vehicle registration: WPR

Pęcice Małe [pɛnˈt͡ɕit͡sɛ ˈmawɛ] is a village in the administrative district of Gmina Michałowice, within Pruszków County, Masovian Voivodeship, in the Warsaw metropolitan area, in east-central Poland.
