= Ignacy Tański =

Polish official, writer, translator, and freemason (1761–1805)

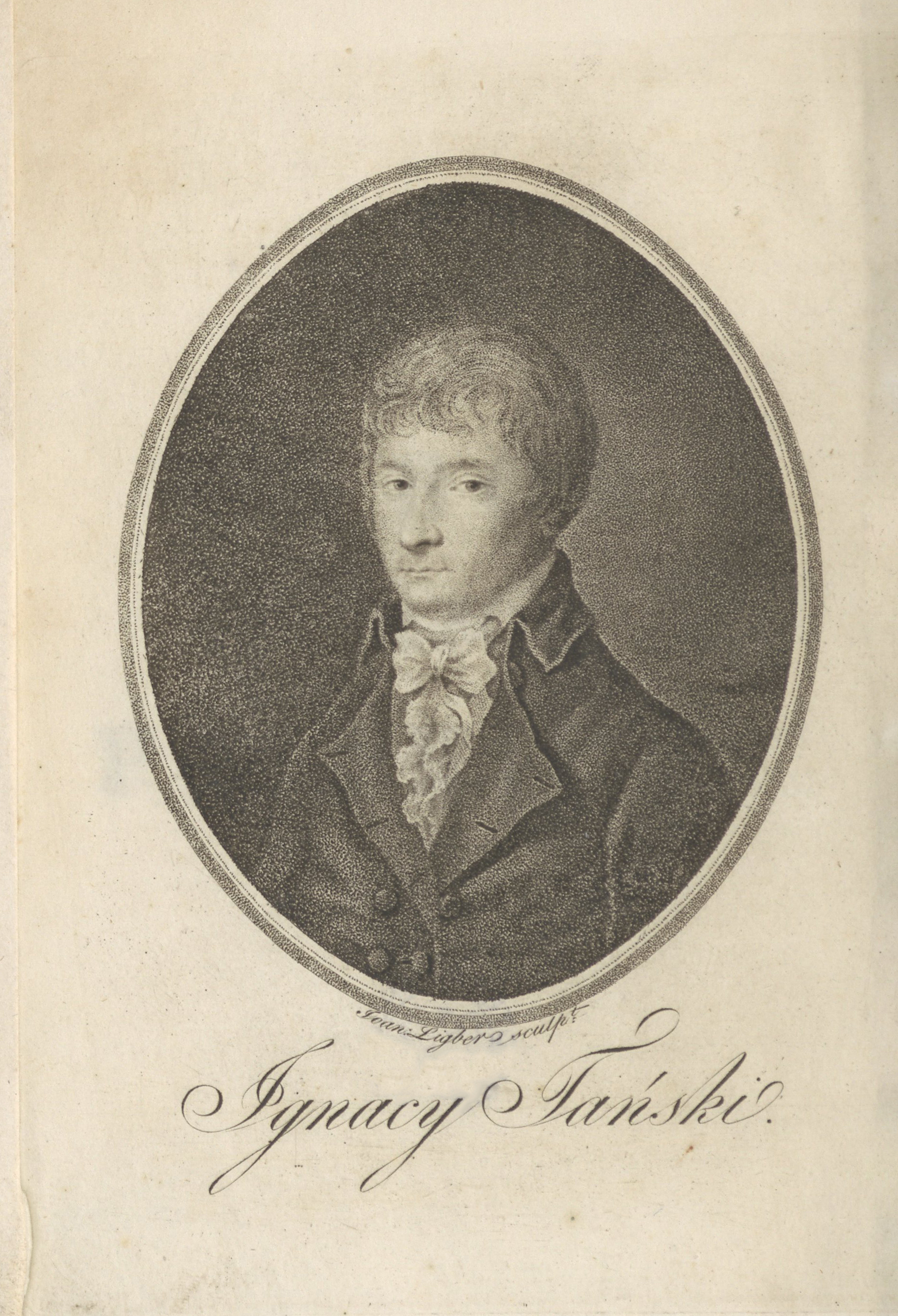
- Born: 1761; Wyszogród
- Died: 15 August 1805; Izdebno Kościelne
- Occupations: official playwright poet translator
- Spouse: Marianna née Czempińska
- Children: Aleksandra, Zofia, Klementyna, Marianna
- Writing career
- Language: Polish
- Period: 18th and 19th century

Ignacy Tański (1761 – 15 August 1805) was a Polish official, playwright, poet, translator and freemason.

He was educated at the Jesuit Collegium Nobilium in Warsaw. Initially, he worked as a lower office clerk at the Police Department by the Permanent Council (1778–1789), and later as the secretary of the Sejm Deputation for investigating Koliyivshchyna (1789–1790) and as a member of the Foreign Affairs Department of King Stanisław August Poniatowski (1793–1794). He was an active participant of the cultural and literary life of Warsaw, being a guest to various aristocratic salons.

During the Kościuszko Uprising (1794) he cooperated with the Foreign Affairs Department and the Security Department of the Supreme National Council. In the Uprising, he lost his possessions and office, as well as both parents who fell victim to the slaughter of Praga. Around 1801 he settled down in Puławy to work as the secretary of Adam Kazimierz Czartoryski. He wrote sentimental and occasional poems, pastoral plays and comedies. He also wrote a libretto for one opera. The collective edition of his works titled Wiersze i pisma różne (Various Poems and Writings) was published posthumously in 1808.

He was the father of Klementyna Hoffmanowa and the uncle of Marceli Tarczewski.

== Biography ==
=== Early years ===
Tański was born in 1761 in Wyszogród, Mazovia to a moderately rich noble family. He was the son of Konstancja née Kurowska, the daughter of miecznik of Czersk; and Tomasz Tański, leaseholder of the villages Orszymowo and Rębów, belonging to the starost of Wyszogród Michał Szymanowski.

Ten of his siblings died in childhood, and beside him only his sister Józefa survived. As an adult, Józefa married Maciej Tarczewski, the burgrave of Wyszogród. Their son was Marceli Tarczewski. After the death of her husband in 1790, Józefa married Wincenty Ferreriusz Kraszewski (c. 1752–1830), the ensign of the National Cavalry.

In his childhood, Ignacy has been friends with members of the Szymanowski family, with which he was affiliated by his mother; and with his relative Józef Tański, who was a poet. He received his first studies at the Jesuit school in Płock. From 1770, he was educated at the Jesuit Collegium Nobilium in Warsaw, where he was said to distinguish himself among other students. He made friendship with Stanisław Mokronowski and Jan Łuszczewski. For a time, he stayed at the court of the castellan of Trakai, Andrzej Ogiński.

=== Official in the Police Department and the Foreign Affairs Office ===
From 1778, he worked as a lower office clerk at the Police Department by the Permanent Council. In that position, he remained under the authority of the Grand Marshal of the Crown Stanisław Lubomirski. From 1780, he worked in this department as an archivist.

From 1781, he belonged to the Freemasonry. He was a member of masonic lodges: The Catherine Under the North Star (Katarzyny pod Gwiazdą Północną) and The Temple of Izis (Świątynia Izis). In the latter, he was a treasurer (1781–1783), a master's governor (1787), an orator (1788), and finally a master of the cathedral (1789–1790).

From 4 March 1783 he was the secretary of the Grand Orient of the Kingdom of Poland and the Grand Duchy of Lithuania (Wielki Wschód Królestwa Polskiego i Wielkiego Księstwa Litewskiego) lodge. Working with Jan Łuszczewski and Józef Orsetti, under the supervision of Maurycy Glaire, he co-developed a constitution, i.e. the statute of the reformed lodge of Grand Orient. The constitution provided for a seven-level organizational system. The Supreme Chapter of the Grand Orient adopted the statute on 19 February 1784. On 26 February that year, thirteen lodges signed the statute, and on 4 March the reformed Grand Orient of the Kingdom of Poland and the Grand Duchy of Lithuania was constituted. From January 1788 Tański served as the First Supervisor of the Grand Orient, and according to Wojciech Pękalski he became a member of the Supreme Chapter of the lodge. During this period, Tański has been writing occasional poems.

In 1789, after the dissolution of the Police Department by the Permanent Council by the Great Sejm, he became the secretary of the Sejm Deputation to investigate the Koliyivshchyna rebellion in Ukraine. Together with Ignacy Manugiewicz, he translated and summarized the materials of the Orthodox bishop Viktor confiscated on 29 April 1789. He co-edited the reports of the Deputation issued in 1790, and received praise for reliability in his work in the Deputation from the member of the Sejm, Mateusz Antoni Butrymowicz.

Tański was an active participant of the literary and cultural life of Warsaw. He was friends with a group of young people who formed a literary discussion circle in the Załuski Library. The group, that worked under the chairmanship of Onufry Kopczyński, consisted of, among others: Michał Wyszkowski, Konstanty Tymieniecki, Alojzy Feliński, Mikołaj Dzieduszycki, Franciszek Skarbek Rudzki and Jan Feliks Amor Tarnowski. Tański was a frequent guest in several salon gatherings, including the salon of Aleksandra Ogińska, wife of Michał Kazimierz Ogiński; the salon of Barbara Sanguszko; and the salon of Warsaw doctor Jan Baptysta Czempiński, embarking upon courtship of Czempiński's daughter, Marianna.

From 1790, Tański was the secretary for Polish expeditions in the Deputation of Interests of Foreign Affairs. According to the testimony of his daughter Klementyna, “forced out of his office,” he accompanied King Stanisław August to the Grodno Sejm in 1793.

=== In the Kościuszko Uprising ===
As the secretary of the Royal Cabinet of Foreign Affairs, on 19 April 1794 he signed the accession of citizens and residents of the Masovian Duchy to the Kościuszko Uprising.

From June 1794, he was a correspondence inspector in the Department of Foreign Affairs of the Supreme National Council. Tański's task was to select from the incoming letters ones that were important for the state, or interesting, and to transfer them to the higher authorities. From July 1794, he was a member of the Postal Department in the Security Department of the Supreme National Council.

He also joined the Targowica-Grodno Deputation (Deputacja Targowicko-Grodzieńska), which was set up to control the Targowica Confederation and the Grodno Sejm activity. Tański signed the report of this Deputation, that was submitted on 26 July 1794 to the Military Criminal Court. He also helped to prepare an alphabetical list of names of people who were in any way engaged in the Targowica Confederation, and thus were recognized as ones that should not hold public trust offices. Tables of 9 September 1794 with Tański's signature were used for interrogations in the Military Criminal Court.

Both parents of Tański were killed during the Uprising. They fell victim to the slaughter of Praga on 4 November 1794. Their manor was looted, and their savings were stolen.

After the fall of the Uprising, Tański himself lost both his wealth and office. He agreed to a proposal of his friend, Jan Łuszczewski, and took over the lease of the village of Wyczułki in the Sochaczew poviat, which was within the borders of Prussia from 1795. He lived with his family in a thatched cottage, organizing the farm and maintaining social contacts, including with Łuszczewscy, Szymanowski from Izdebna and Tekla Teresa Łubieńska and her husband Feliks Łubieński from the nearby Guzów.

Tański took up the translation of Virgil's Georgics, but he managed to translate only the first and a part of the second song using Polish alexandrine. He wrote more occasional pieces.

=== In Puławy: A secretary of Prince Czartoryski ===
In 1800, Tański received compensation from the Prussian authorities for the lost office in the form of an annual salary. Also around that time, Aleksandra, the oldest daughter of Tański, was admitted to a girls' school in Puławy by Izabela and Adam Kazimierz Czartoryski.

Around 1801, Tański accepted the invitation of Adam Kazimierz Czartoryski to become his secretary with a salary of six thousand Polish złotys a year, and together with his wife and daughter Zofia moved to Puławy, an estate of the Czartoryscy, that was in the territory remaining under Austrian rule.

Tański's five-act rhymed comedy Dobrogost, or a Man Happy with Everything (Dobrogost, czyli człowiek rad wszystkiemu) was staged in Izdebno in 1801 or 1802. It was the adaptation of L'Optimiste, ou l'homme toujours content (1788) by Jean-François Collin d'Harleville. In 1802, Tański's opera Also the Rumor is Useful Sometimes (I plotka czasem się przyda) was staged in Puławy. The music was composed by Wincenty Lessel. The way in which Tański has been building the intrigue was later compared by literature historians to The Presumed Miracle, or Krakovians and Highlanders by Wojciech Bogusławski. Introducing a Gypsy character in one of the scenes was by some read as a reference to The Gypsies, an opera by Franciszek Dionizy Kniaźnin.

In Puławy, two other comedies of Tański were staged. These were: Two Ages (Dwa wieki) and Żegota, that is Old Polish Customs (Żegota, czyli staropolskie obyczaje). Tański continued writing occasional poems, that were mainly humorous or panegyric. Roman Dąbrowski assessed that “in terms of artistic value, these were average pieces, usually short, with a light theme and mood, close to rococo, sometimes sentimental poetics.”

Ignacy Tański died on 15 August 1805 following a sudden attack of apoplexy while he was visiting the Szymanowscy in Izdebno. There was he buried.

After Tański's death, his widowed wife Marianna received half of her husband's salary from Adam Kazimierz Czartoryski. From around 1808, Marianna Tańska lived with her daughters in Warsaw, in the outbuilding of the Blue Palace, running an open house. At the instigation of her daughter Klementyna, she wrote Journal of Events from 1820 onwards.

The collective edition of Tański's works titled Wiersze i pisma różne (Various Poems and Writings) was published three years after his death, in 1808. Michał Wyszkowski wrote that Tański “was short of growth, a figure not so much of a size, but more pleasant and endearing; his sharp and steadfast gaze was characterized by the independence of the soul and the openness of character which only fair deeds can give.”

=== Family ===
Ignacy Tański was married to Marianna Rozalia Regina née Czempińska (1773–1825), the daughter of Jan Baptysta Czempiński (1721–1786) and Prowidencja née Fontana, the daughter of Józef Fontana and Teresa née Poncet.

The Tańskis had four daughters: Aleksandra (1792–1850), the wife of Marek Marceli Tarczewski; Zofia (1793–1803); Klementyna (1798–1845), writer and translator; and Marianna (1803–1830), the wife of Jan Nepomucen Herman, captain of the army of the Kingdom of Poland, judge of peace and industrialist; raised by her grandmother Prowidencja in Kozłów.

== Bibliography ==
- Dąbrowski, Roman (2018). "Tański Ignacy (1761–1805)". Polski Słownik Biograficzny. Vol. LII. pp. 168–170. ISBN 978-83-65880-14-7.
- Wielka Encyklopedia Powszechna PWN. Vol. XI. Warszawa: Państwowe Wydawnictwo Naukowe. 1968. pp. 388–389.
- Bibliografia Literatury Polskiej – Nowy Korbut. Vol. 6. Warszawa: Państwowy Instytut Wydawniczy. 1970. pp. 331–333.
- Wielka encyklopedia PWN. Vol. XXVII. Warszawa: Wydawnictwo Naukowe PWN. 2005. p. 170. ISBN 83-01-14362-2.
