= Suchy Las, Masovian Voivodeship =

Suchy Las
- Village
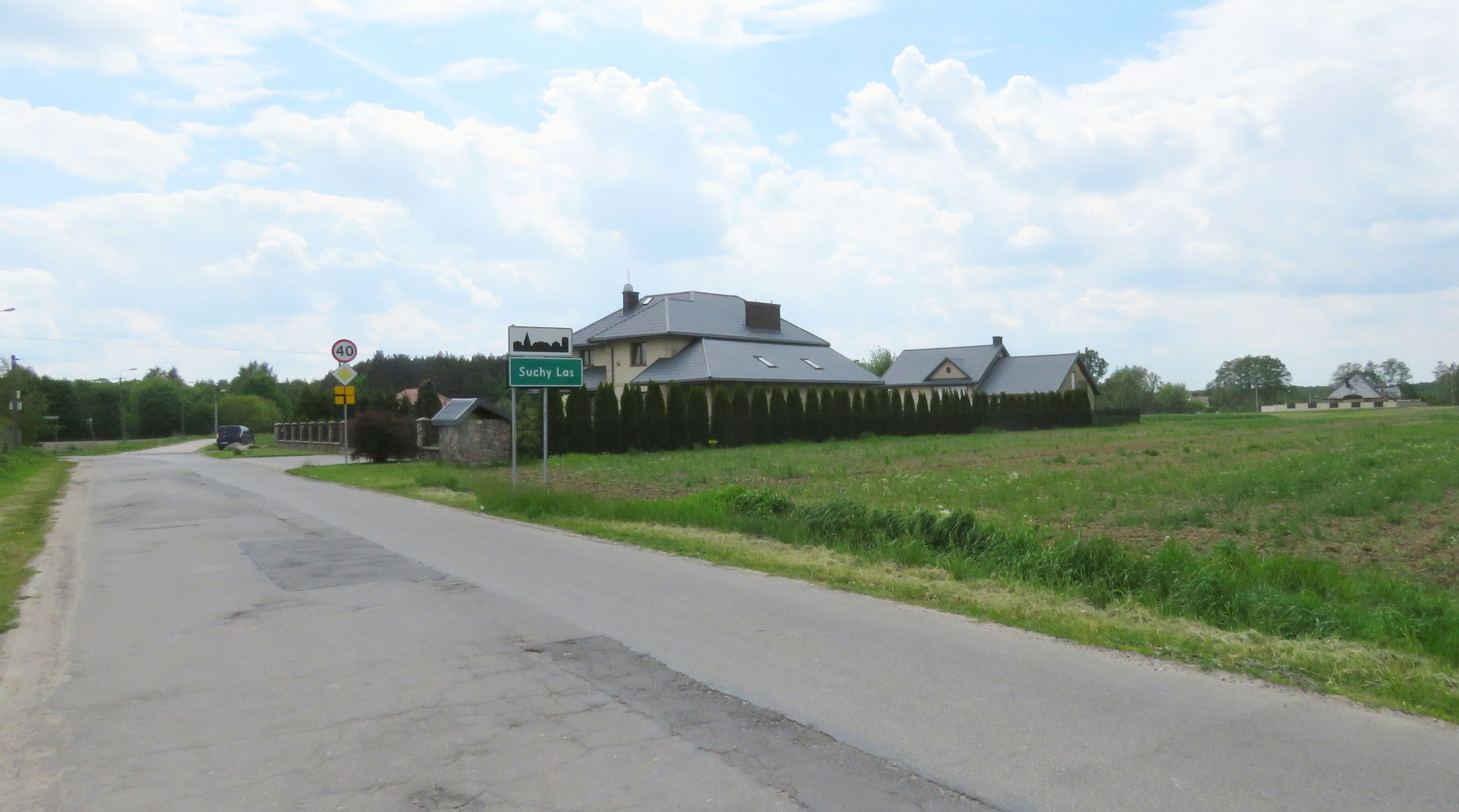

- Location within Poland
- Coordinates: 52°8′N 20°51′E
- Country: Poland
- Voivodeship: Masovian
- County: Pruszków
- Gmina: Michałowice
- Time zone: UTC+1 (CET)
  - Summer (DST): UTC+2 (CEST)
- Vehicle registration: WPR

Suchy Las [ˈsuxɨ ˈlas] is a village in the administrative district of Gmina Michałowice, within Pruszków County, Masovian Voivodeship, in the Warsaw metropolitan area, in east-central Poland.
