= Nowa Wieś, Pruszków County =

Nowa Wieś
- Village
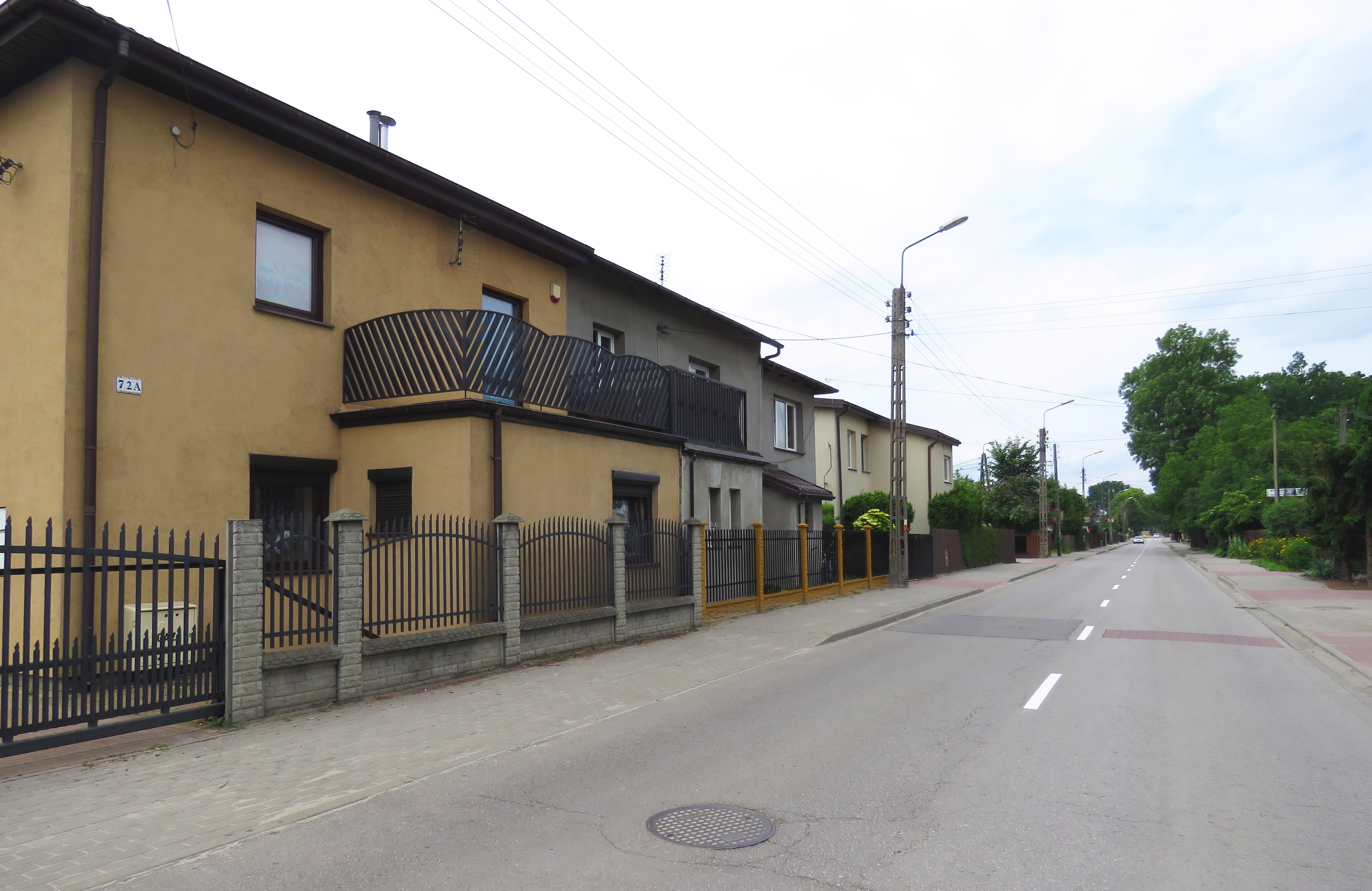

- Location within Poland
- Coordinates: 52°08′48″N 20°47′18″E
- Country: Poland
- Voivodeship: Masovian
- County: Pruszków
- Gmina: Michałowice

Population
  - Total: 1,571
- Time zone: UTC+1 (CET)
  - Summer (DST): UTC+2 (CEST)
- Vehicle registration: WPR

Nowa Wieś [ˈnɔva ˈvjɛɕ] is a village in the administrative district of Gmina Michałowice, within Pruszków County, Masovian Voivodeship, in the Warsaw metropolitan area, in east-central Poland.
