= Michałowice, Pruszków County =

Michałowice
- Village
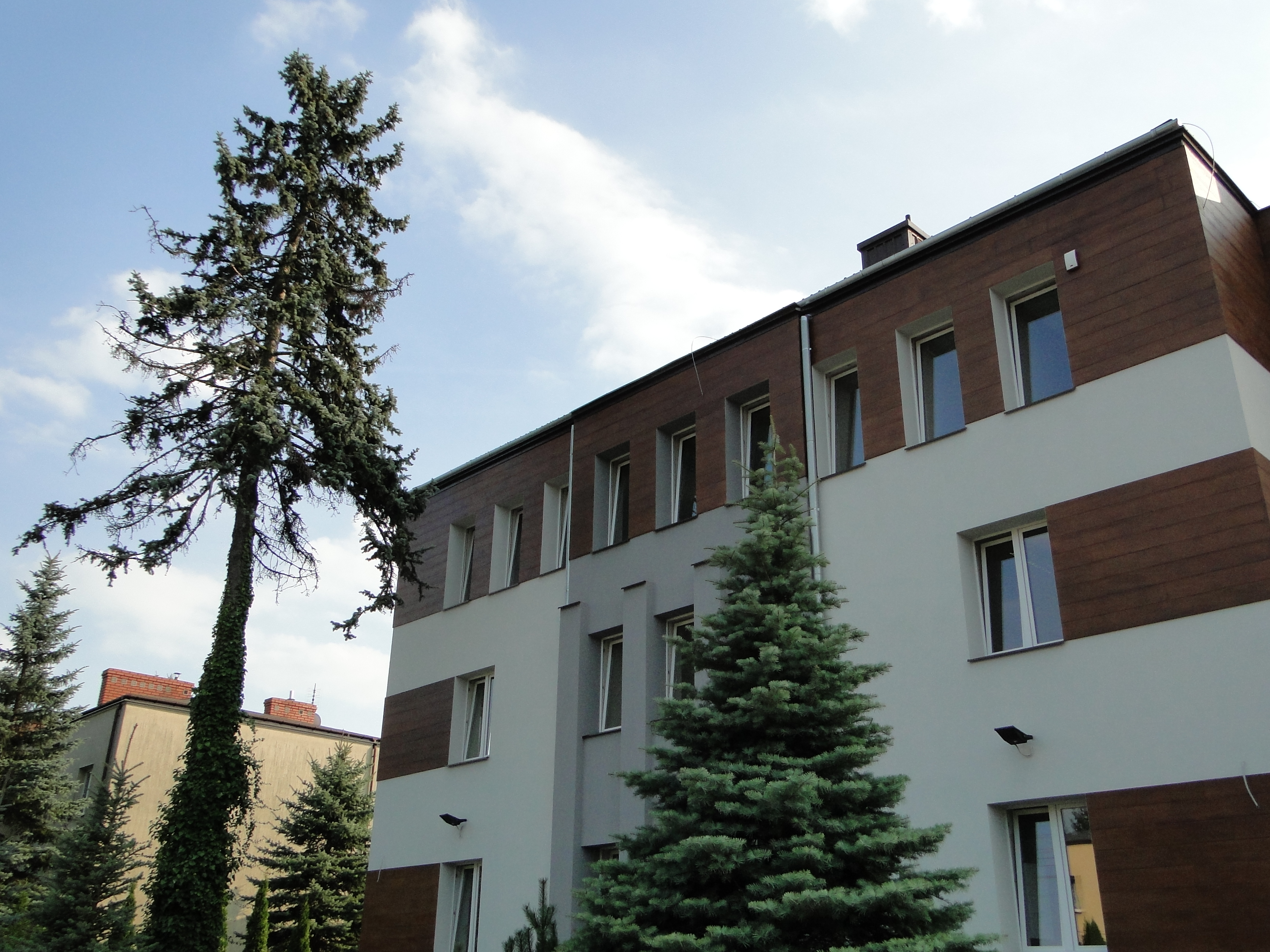

- Coat of arms

- Location within Poland
- Coordinates: 52°10′12″N 20°53′0″E
- Country: Poland
- Voivodeship: Masovian
- County: Pruszków
- Gmina: Michałowice

Population
  - Total: 3,085
- Time zone: UTC+1 (CET)
  - Summer (DST): UTC+2 (CEST)
- Vehicle registration: WPR

Michałowice [mixawɔˈvit͡sɛ] is a village in Pruszków County, Masovian Voivodeship, Gmina Michałowice, in the Warsaw metropolitan area, in east-central Poland. As of 2021 the village's population was 3085.
