= Komorów, Pruszków County =

Komorów
- Garden city
- Miasta Ogrodu Komorów
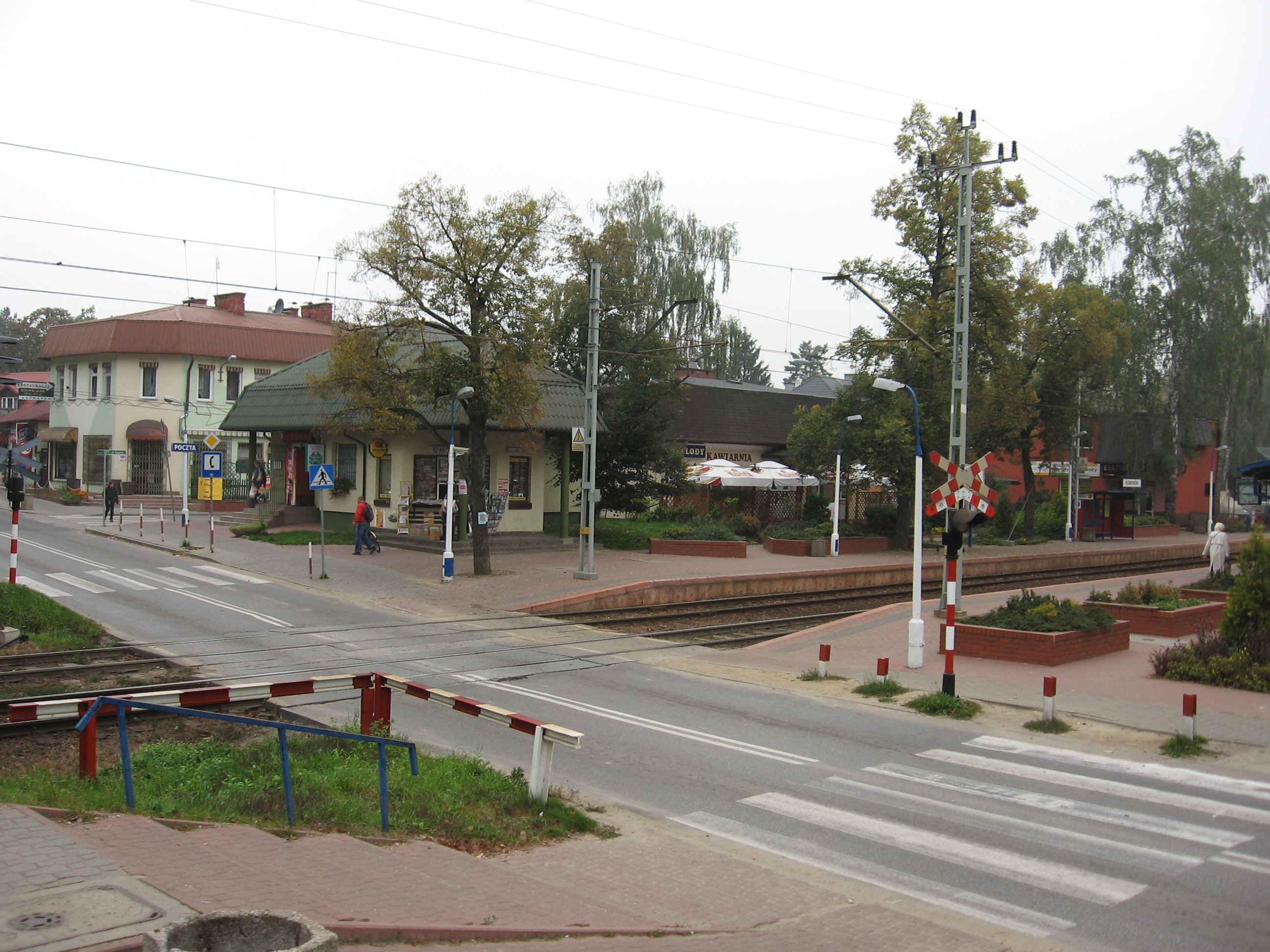

- Location within Poland
- Coordinates: 52°8′40″N 20°48′55″E
- Country: Poland
- Voivodeship: Masovian
- County: Pruszków
- Gmina: Michałowice
- Population: 4,570
- Time zone: UTC+1 (CET)
  - Summer (DST): UTC+2 (CEST)
- Vehicle registration: WPR

Komorów [kɔˈmɔruf] is a village in the administrative district of Gmina Michałowice, within Pruszków County, Masovian Voivodeship, in the Warsaw metropolitan area, in east-central Poland.

The village was founded in 1424. The name comes from the Slavic name Komor. It has its own suburban light railway station - Komorów WKD (Warszawska Kolej Dojazdowa).

In 1956, novelist Maria Dąbrowska settled in Komorów. She has been nominated five times for the Nobel Prize in Literature. Her residence currently houses a local library.

== History ==
First written mention in 1424 (Comorowo). A possessive name, patronymic from the Slavic name Komor.

Initially it was a village divided into several parts, in the hands of minor nobility (Komorowski family), an offshoot of the Pierzchała family from the family nest in Pęcice. The Komorowski family were among the co-founders of the Pęcice parish. The timing of the formation of the Pęcice parish is an evidence of the existence of Komorów at the same time. Komorów belonged to this parish until the creation of the parish in Komorów itself after World War II (the erection of the parish in 1958).

Until the 17th century, it was mostly in the hands of the Komorowski family of the Pierzchała coat of arms or related minor nobility. In the 17th century in the hands of the Chądzyński family of Ciołek coat of arms, the Kalisz family of Ciołek coat of arms and the Sobolewski family of Ślepowron coat of arms. Consolidated in the 18th century, it became the sole property of the Sobolewski family. After the purchase of the petty gentry parts of the neighboring village of Sokołów, one grange was created. In the hands of Sobolewski until the beginning of the 19th century. In 1827 it was sold to Marceli Tarczewski.

In 1850, by virtue of a verdict of the Civil Tribunal of the Warsaw Governorate, through forced expropriation, the Komorów-Sokołów estate was acquired by Franciszek Brzeziński, owner of the "Polski" Hotel in Warsaw.

By virtue of the enfranchisement in 1867, quite considerable parts in Komorów itself and (which accounted for almost half of the estate) the entire area of the village of Sokołów fell from the estate. It remained in the hands of successive heirs until 1911. In that year Stanisław Józefowicz (married to Brzezińska) sold the estate to the previous administrator - Józef Markowicz. Markowicz parceled out the fields of the Komorów estate and sold plots to private owners and building cooperatives in three stages:

- stage 1 - the sale of the first plots in 1912 in the western part called "Komorów A", or "Stary Komorów" ("Old Komorów"),
- stage 2 - sale of the first plots in 1923 of the area named "Strzecha Polska" ("Polish Thatch"), or "Komorówek" colony,
- stage 3 - the sale of the first plots in 1930 of the largest area later named "Komorów Garden-City".

The sale was interrupted by World War II.

== Komorów Garden City ==
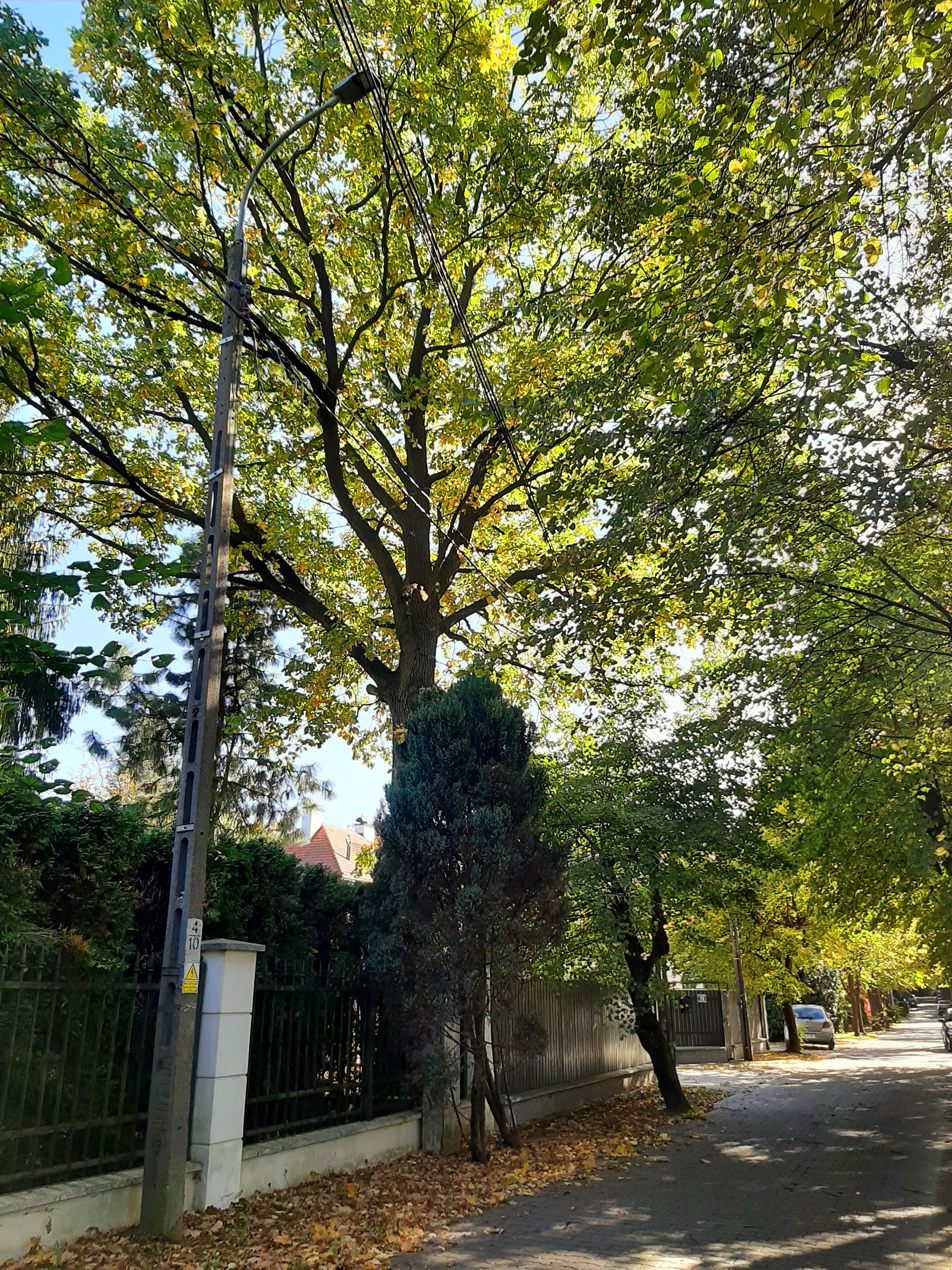
Lipowa street in Komorów

Komorów development as a settlement began on January 14, 1930, when the Warsaw Provincial Office approved a plan to parcel out Komorów private estate, owned by Józef Markowicz, naming it Komorów Garden-City, as a part of the Garden city movement, located in Błoński County in Helenów Municipality.

Komorów Garden City was established on the initiative of the landowner, Józef Markowicz, in the area bounded by the streets that exist today: Maria Dąbrowska Avenue, Starych Lip (transl. Old Linden) Avenue, Norwid Str., Okrężna Str., Granicka Str., Nowowiejska Str., Harcerska and Matejki Str. The total Garden City covered an area of 73 hectares.

The notarial deed of sale included a stipulation that “The Komorów Garden-City is intended for a model settlement” and therefore “the acquired plot of land may only be used for the construction of a residential house,” and requirements were formulated to safeguard the health and aesthetics of the settlement.

The average plot size was 1100 m^{2}, a grid of streets 10, 14, and even more than 20 meters wide was designated, space was provided for a park, a church, a school, an 11,000 m^{2} sports area, two estate squares, and even a train route to Nadarzyn. All these areas were donated to the Komorów Garden-City free of charge.

During World War II, the Warsaw intelligentsia hid in Komorów, and partisans were trained in the surrounding forests.

During and after the Warsaw Uprising, a makeshift hospital for refugees from Warsaw was organized in Komorów.

After the war, Komorów estate was nationalized. Markowicz Palace was turned into a sanatorium for patients of the Psychiatric Institute in Warsaw.

== Notable residents ==
- Maria Dąbrowska (1889–1965), novelist, essayist and journalist
- Magda Gessler (born 1953), television personality, celebrity chef, restaurateur and painter
- Wojciech Młynarski (1941–2017), poet, singer, songwriter, translator and director
- Maja Komorowska (born 1937), theater and film actress, professor of theater arts
- Natalia Kukulska (born 1976), singer and songwriter
- Bogusław Linda (born 1952), actor, director, and writer
