= Gmina Michałowice, Masovian Voivodeship =

Gmina Michałowice Michałowice Commune
- Gmina
- Coat of arms
- Interactive map of Gmina Michałowice
- Coordinates (Michałowice): 52°10′12″N 20°53′0″E
- Country: Poland
- Voivodeship: Masovian
- County: Pruszków
- Seat: Reguły

Area
  - Total: 34.88 km^{2} (13.47 sq mi)

Population (2023)
  - Total: 17,932
  - Density: 514.1/km^{2} (1,332/sq mi)
- Website: http://www.michalowice.pl

Gmina Michałowice is a rural gmina (administrative district) in Pruszków County, Masovian Voivodeship, in east-central Poland. Its seat is the village of Reguły, is named after the village of Michałowice and the biggest village is Komorów. It borders the towns of Pruszków and Piastów and the city of Warsaw.

The gmina covers an area of 34.88 square kilometres (13.5 sq mi), and as of 2023 its total population is 17,932.

== Villages ==
Gmina Michałowice contains the villages and settlements of Komorów, Michałowice, Nowa Wieś, Opacz Kolonia, Opacz Mała, Pęcice, Pęcice Małe, Reguły, Sokołów and Suchy Las.

== Neighbouring gminas ==
Gmina Michałowice is bordered by Warsaw, by the towns of Piastów and Pruszków, and by the gminas of Brwinów, Nadarzyn and Raszyn.
