= Marceli Jasiński =

Polish composer and music critic

Marceli Jasiński (Russian Марцелий Антонович Ясинський; 1837 – d. 1867) was a Polish composer and music critic residing in Ukraine. He published several articles and music pieces in Józef Sikorski's weekly magazine Ruch muzyczny under pseudonym Józef Doroszenko. He also worked for Telegraf Kijowski. His reviews were about music in regions of Volhynia, Podolia and Ukraine.

Jasiński composed at least two ballets. The first was Pan Twardowski (a Polish folklore sorcerer) in 5 parts, staged in Kiev in 1860. The other was Cień. His other works were songs, piano and orchestral pieces. His Dumka for violin or basolia with piano was recently republished.
