= Klementyna Hoffmanowa =

Polish novelist, playwright and teacher (1798–1845)

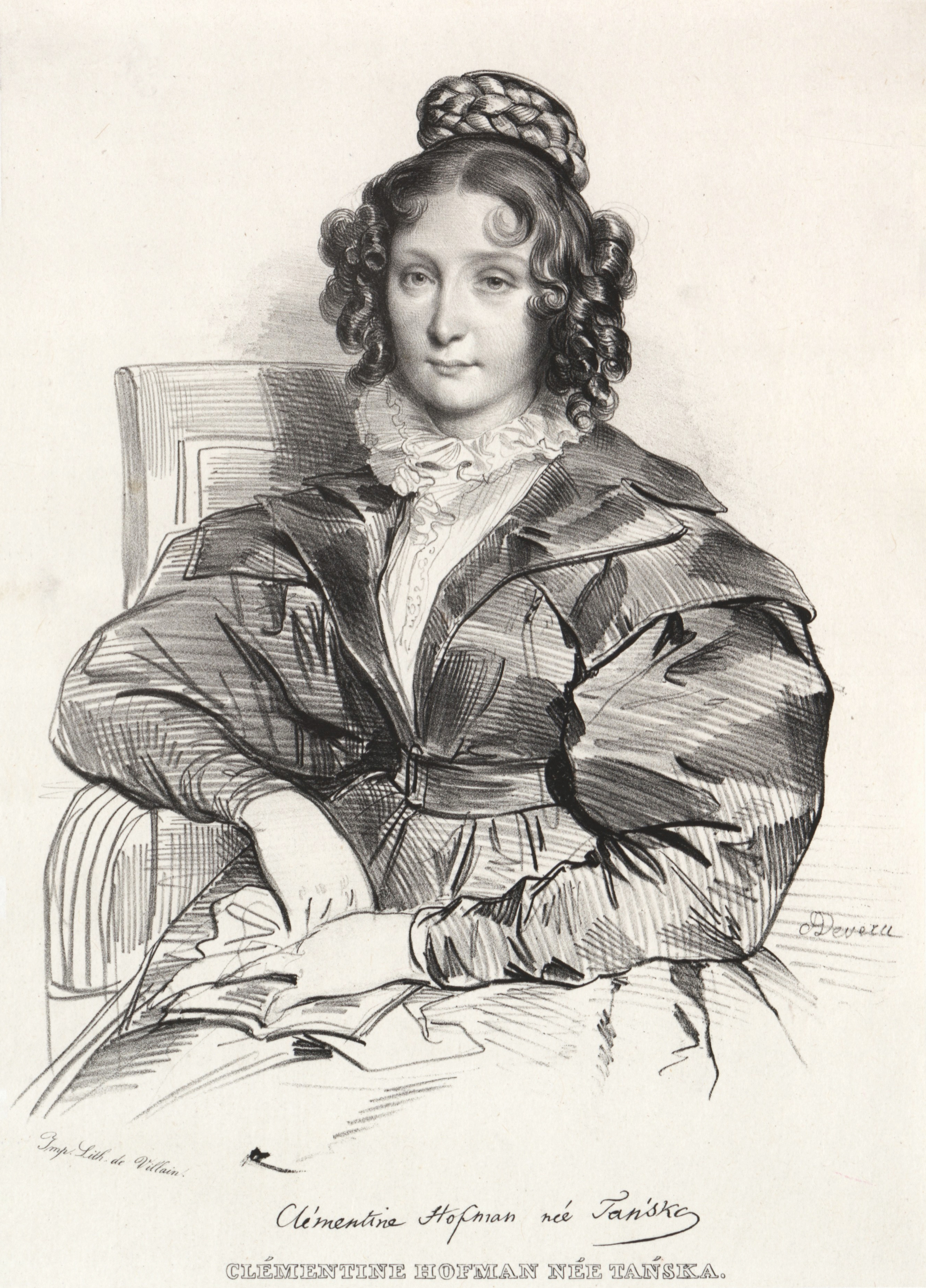
- Born: Klementyna Tańska; November 23, 1798; Warsaw
- Died: September 21, 1845 (aged 46); Passy near Paris
- Resting place: Père Lachaise Cemetery
- Occupation: Novelist
- Writing career
- Language: Polish
- Period: 19th century
- Notable work: The Diary of Countess Françoise Krasinska

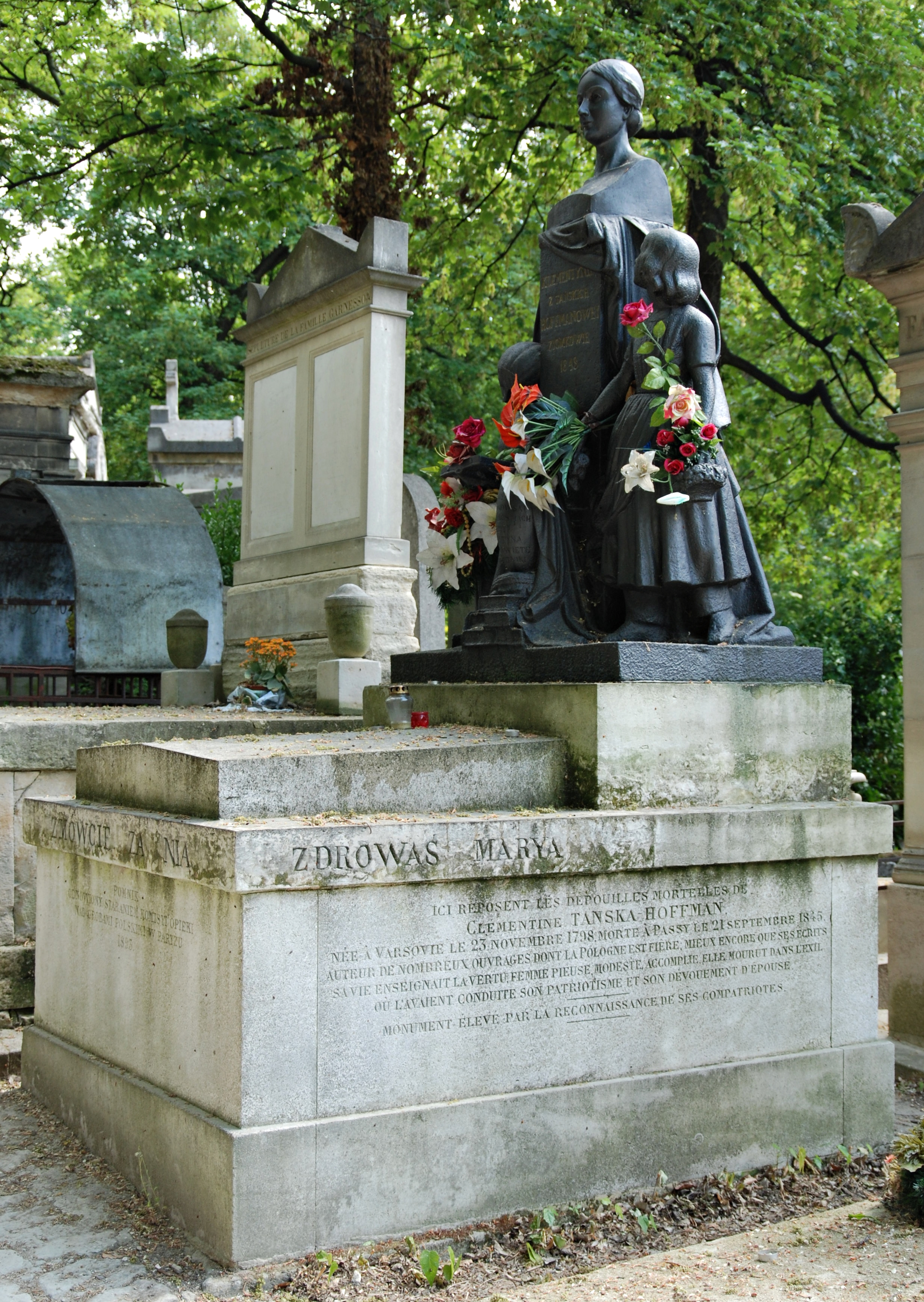
Writer's grave at the Père Lachaise Cemetery

Klementyna Hoffmanowa, born Klementyna Tańska (Note: After the marriage, she signed and was most commonly referred to as Klementyna z Tańskich Hoffmanowa (Klementyna Hoffmanowa née Tańska).) (23 November 1798 – 21 September 1845) was a Polish novelist, playwright, editor, translator, teacher and activist. She was the first woman in Poland to support herself from writing and teaching, as well as one of Poland's first writers of children's literature.

She made her debut in 1819 with a moralizing treatise A Souvenir After a Good Mother. In the 1820s, she edited a popular magazine for children and published several children books, that have won a wide audience over several generations. She also published a number of novels, including: The Letters of Elżbieta Rzeczycka to her friend Urszula (1824) and, arguably her best known work, The Diary of Countess Françoise Krasinska (1825), translated into several languages, and recounted as one of the first Polish psychological novels.

Hoffmanowa raised the postulate of economic self-empowerment of women. She believed that the first step for women to achieve independence should be gaining education to enable paid work. However, she held conservative views on the role of women and referred to national and Catholic values.

In 1826, her candidacy for membership in the Warsaw Society of Friends of Learning was submitted, but she was not accepted as a woman. She remained unmarried until the age of thirty, long by the standards of her time for a woman, and only in 1829 she married Karol Boromeusz Hoffman. Until then she used her maiden name.

Though writing was her main and most preferred activity and she considered herself primarily a writer, she also worked as a teacher (as an inspector or a visitator) of female schools, and lecturer in moral science at the Governess' Institute in Warsaw (1826–1831). She educated a number of young women, some of whom later became writers and teachers themselves. Hoffmanowa was recalled with respect and appreciation by some of her students; in turn her pupil Narcyza Żmichowska criticized Hoffmanowa's conservatism.

During the November Uprising of Polish people against the Russian Empire, Hoffmanowa was a co-creator and chairman of the Union of Patriotic Charity of the Varsovians and carried the help to the wounded soldiers. After the fall of the uprising in 1831, she and her husband fled to Paris, where their house became a meeting place for Polish political refugees. In Paris, Hoffmanowa was active in the Charity Association of Polish Ladies and the Literary Society, and was called “the Mother of the Great Emigration”. She was friends with Chopin and Mickiewicz.

She died of breast cancer at the age of 46 and was buried at the Père Lachaise Cemetery.

== Biography ==
She came from a moderately rich noble family. She was the daughter of Ignacy Tański, Polish writer and novelist. For some time she lived with her mother in Warsaw. In 1819 she published her first book, Pamiątka po dobrej matce, czyli ostatnie jej rady dla córki (A Souvenir After a Good Mother, or Her Final Advice to Her Daughter), a monologue in which an older woman imparts final words of wisdom and advice to a daughter.

In 1829 she married Karol Boromeusz Hoffman, writer, lawyer and historian, and changed her name to Hoffmanowa, a marital form of her husband's surname. After Poland's November Uprising against the Russian Empire was crushed in the second half of 1831, Hoffmanowa moved with her husband to Dresden, and later settled in Paris. She was called "the Mother of the Great Emigration”.

In 1919 a Warsaw high school, one of the oldest in the country, was named after her.

== Selected works ==
A list includes original Polish titles.

- 1819: Pamiątka po dobrej Matce przez dobrą Polkę
- 1823: Wiązanie Helenki
- 1824: Listy Elżbiety Rzeczyckiej do przyjaciółki Urszuli za panowania Augusta III pisane
- 1825: Druga książeczka Helenki
- 1825: Dziennik Franciszki Krasińskiej w ostatnich latach Augusta III pisany (The Diary of Countess Françoise Krasinska)
- 1830: Powieści z Pisma świętego (stories from the Old Testament)
- 1832: Rozrywki dla Dzieci
- 1833: Wybór pism, volumes I–X
- 1833: Biografie znakomitych Polaków i Polek
- 1839: Karolina
- 1841: Krystyna
- 1845: Jan Kochanowski w Czarnolesie
- 1849: Pisma pośmiertne
- 1849: O powinnościach kobiet
- 1851: Pismo święte wybrane z ksiąg Starego i Nowego Zakonu objaśnione uwagami pobożnych uczonych i ofiarowane matkom i dzieciom przez Autorkę Pamiątki po dobrej matce (stories from the Bible)

Posthumous publications:

- 1857–1859: Pisma, volumes I-XI
- 1876: Dzieła, volumes I-XII (edited by N. Żmichowska)
- 1898: Wybór Dzieł, volumes I-IV (edited by P. Chmielowski)
