= Reguły =

- Village
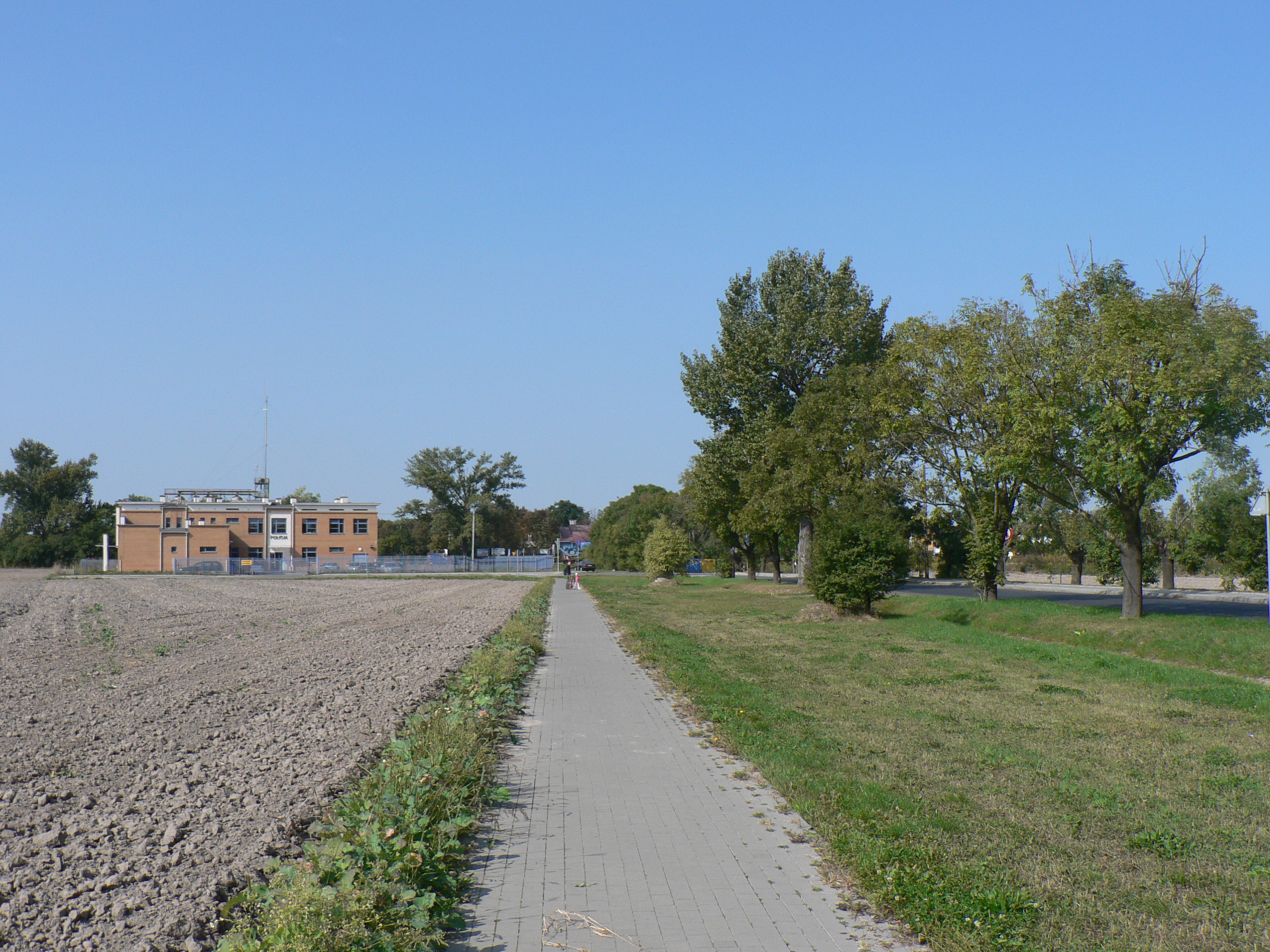

- Location within Poland
- Coordinates: 52°10′13″N 20°51′34″E
- Country: Poland
- Voivodeship: Masovian
- County: Pruszków
- Gmina: Michałowice

Population (2021)
  - Total: 2,193
- Postal code: 05-816

Reguły [rɛˈɡu.wɨ] is a village in the administrative district of Gmina Michałowice, within Pruszków County, Masovian Voivodeship, in east-central Poland.
