= Tomasz Jasiński =

Tomasz Jasiński may refer to:

- Tomasz Jasiński (historian) (born 1951), Polish historian
- Tomasz Jasiński (ice hockey) (1916–1998), Polish ice hockey player
