= Dan Yashinsky =

Canadian storyteller

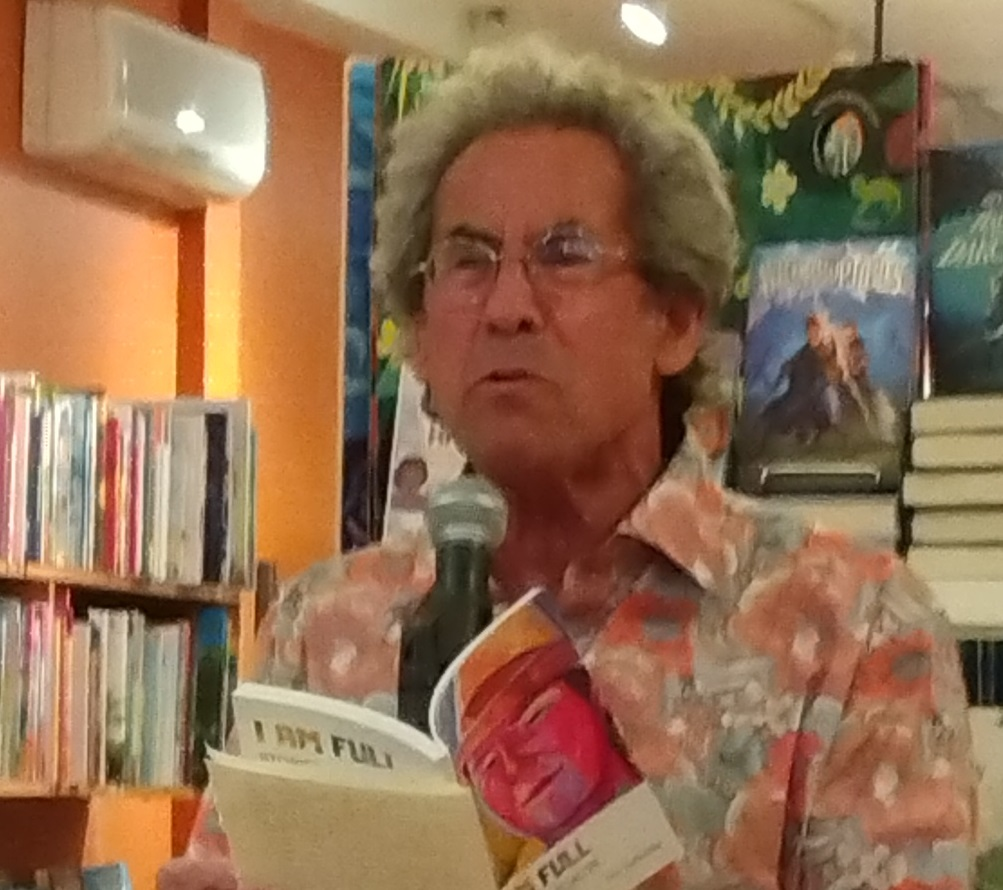
- Dan Yashinsky, 2025
- Born: Detroit, Michigan
- Education: University of California; University of Toronto
- Occupation: Storyteller
- Writing career
- Notable awards: Jane Jacobs's Prize, Chalmers Arts Fellowship
- Website: tellery.com/dan-yashinsky

Dan Yashinsky, born in Detroit, is a Canadian author and storyteller.

Born in Detroit, Dan Yashinsky was educated in Santa Barbara, then moved to Toronto at the age of 21.

He studied at the College of Creative Studies of the University of California where he receive a bachelor's degree in literature followed by a master's degree in sociology and education at the University of Toronto.

In 1978 he established Toronto's 1001 Friday Nights of Story Telling, considered to be the longest running open mic in North America. In 1979 he established the Toronto Festival of Storytelling which he directed for four years. He is also the cofounder of Storytelling Toronto, formerly known as the Storytellers School of Toronto.

He created and hosted the CBC radio show "Talking Stick" in 1999. In 2006 he collaborated with composer and musician Brian Katz to create a piece that addresses the experiences of neonatal intensive care units. Their work, "Talking You In", was inspired by the three-week stay that Yashinsky's son, Jacob, spent in intensive care after his birth and has been performed at hospitals and festivals around the world.

A world renowned storyteller, he has performed and taught the art of story telling at numerous festivals in Canada, The U.S., Asia and Europe. He has also been a storyteller in residence for numerous institutions such as UNICEF Canada, Queen's University at Kingston, Baycrest Centre for Geriatric Care and many others.

His inspiration derives from his Jewish, Turkish, Romanian, American and French heritages as well as his world travels.

In 2018, Jacob Yashinsky-Zavitz, son of Dan Yashinsky and Carol Zavitz, died at age 26 following a car accident.

== Works ==
=== Story Collections ===
- Tales for an Unknown City : Stories from One Thousand and One Friday Nights of Storytelling, Montréal, McGill-Queen's University Press, 1990, 265 p. ISBN 0773507868.
- The Storyteller at Fault, Charlottetown, Ragweed Press, 1998, 254 p. ISBN 0921556292, 9780921556299.
- Suddenly They Heard Footsteps : Storytelling for the Twenty-First Century, Toronto, Alfred A. Knopf Canada, 2004, 317 p. ISBN 0676975925.
- Swimming with Chaucer : A Storyteller's Logbook, London, Insomniac Press, 2013, 238 p. ISBN 9781554831098, 1554831091.
- At the Edge : A Book of Risky Stories, Charlottetown, Ragweed Press, 1998, 254 p. ISBN 0921556748, 9780921556749.

=== Collaborations ===
- Next Teller : A Book of Canadian Storytelling, Charlottetown/East Haven, Ragweed Press/Inland Book, 1994, 246 p. ISBN 0921556462, 9780921556466.
- Ghostwise: A Book of Midnight Stories, Charlottetown, Ragweed Press, 1997, 223 p. ISBN 0874834996, 9780874834994.

=== Other ===
- The Telling Project, Mississauga, Peel Board of Education, 1993, 47 p. ISBN 1550380672, 9781550380675.

== Awards and honors ==
- 1999: Winner of the first Jane Jacobs's Prize.
- 2009: Recipient of the Chalmers Arts Fellowship from the Ontario Arts Council.
