= Stanisław Jasiński and Emilia Słodkowska =

Emilia Słodkowska Righteous Among the Nations
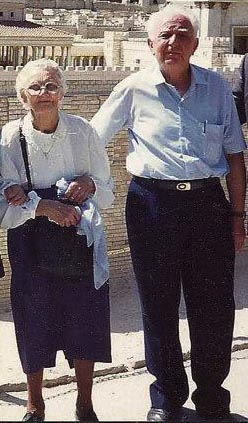
- Emilia Słodkowska with Samuel Lederman (Szmuel Liderman) at a ceremony in Jerusalem, 1985

This is a sub-article to Polish Righteous among the Nations

Stanisław Jasiński and his daughter, Emilia Słodkowska née Jasińska, risked their lives and the lives of their families during the Holocaust in order to save Jews from extermination by the Ukrainian Nationalists and the Nazis. They were awarded the medals of Righteous among the Nations (Hebrew: חסידי אומות העולם, Chassidey Umot HaOlam) bearing their name, a certificate of honor, and the privilege of having their names added to those on the Wall of Honor in the Garden of the Righteous at Yad Vashem in Jerusalem, on February 28, 1985. Stanisław Jasiński received his title posthumously.

== The escapes ==
At the onset of World War II, Stanisław Jasiński – who was already blind and elderly – lived on a farm surrounded by forest, on the outskirts of Kostopol in Wołyń Voivodeship (Volhynia) in south-eastern Poland. He was being cared for by his daughter Emilia. They shared the house together with her husband and their three children. In September 1942, the German SS accompanied by the Ukrainian auxiliary police began hunting down Polish Jews in the area. In nearby villages of Małe Siedliszcze and Antonowka, consecutively, the Jews were massacred in the woods, after being forced first to dig their own mass graves. There were two brothers, who escaped both pogroms, Szmuel and Josef Liderman. They ran across the fields from Siedliszcze to Antonowka, and then again, half naked away from the execution pit while it was being dug. They were shot at, and Szmuel was injured in the hand. Naked and exhausted, the two reached the house of Stanisław Jasiński, who was an acquaintance of their murdered father, from before the Invasion of Poland. Jasiński family took in the two Jewish escapees. Emilia bandaged Szmuel's hand, and clothed them both. The brothers were put in the barn, where they slept on straw mattresses. They were housed and fed without recompense. After a few days, two more Jews showed up at Jasinski's house, Szaje Odler and Akiba Kremer. They had also escaped the massacres in local forests, and like the other two, were given shelter and assistance.

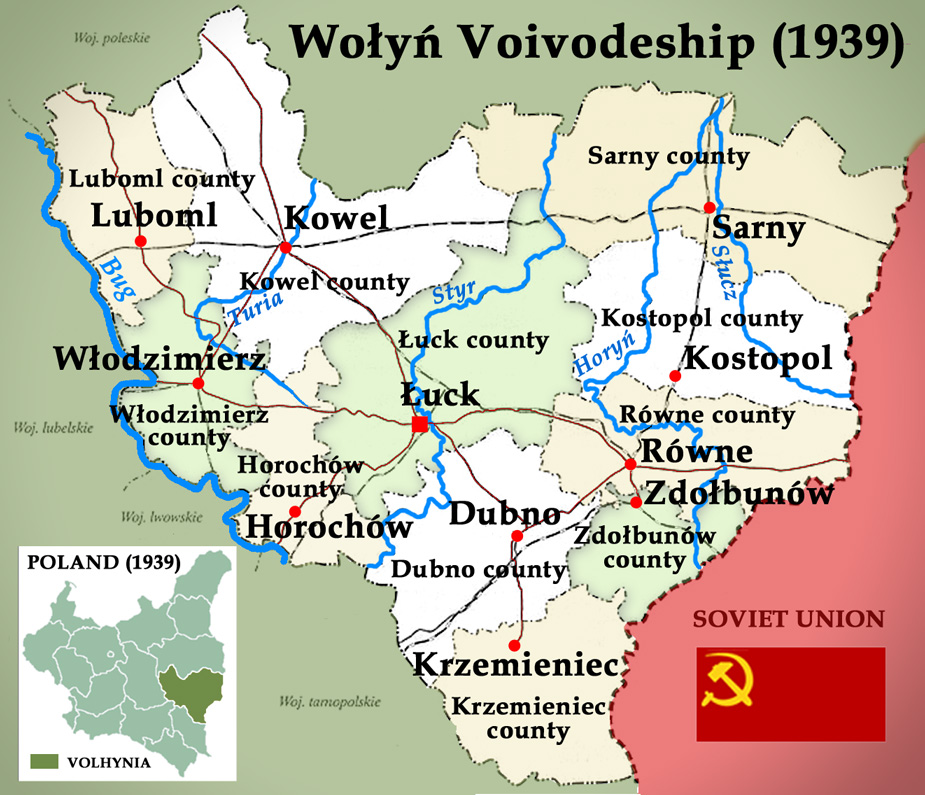
1939 map showing Wołyń Voivodeship (no longer in existence), with the town of Kostopol (now Ukraine)

== The hideout ==
Once the four refugees rested enough, it was decided that a bunker would be dug beneath the cowshed, as a more permanent hideout for themselves, with the Nazi threat of the death penalty looming over everyone, including the Jasiński children. However, the place became unsafe after just two months, as soon as the Jasinskis became widely known as sheltering Jews on their farm. The fugitives left and hid even deeper in the forest, where they remained until the arrival of the Red Army in July 1944. They were lucky enough to survive the massacres of Poles in Volhynia by Ukrainian nationalists which went on since 1943, however, they were caught by the Ukrainian assassins in August 1944 already behind the Russian front. Akiba Kremer, Szaje Odler and Josef Liderman were murdered. After the war – once her father died – Emilia Slodkowska emigrated to the United States. Szmuel Liderman, who was the only surviving fugitive hidden by her, learned about her address years later and the two began corresponding. He submitted a deposition on her behalf to Yad Vashem; and, on February 28, 1985, Yad Vashem awarded the title of Righteous Among the Nations to both, Stanisław Jasiński (posthumously) and his daughter, Emilia Słodkowska (née Jasińska) for their bravery.

== Notes and references ==
- C.M.Krolikowski, Polonia w Izraelu, callendarium

Media related to Emilia Słodkowska at Wikimedia Commons
