= Tadeusz Jasiński =

Defender of Grodno in the Soviet invasion of Poland

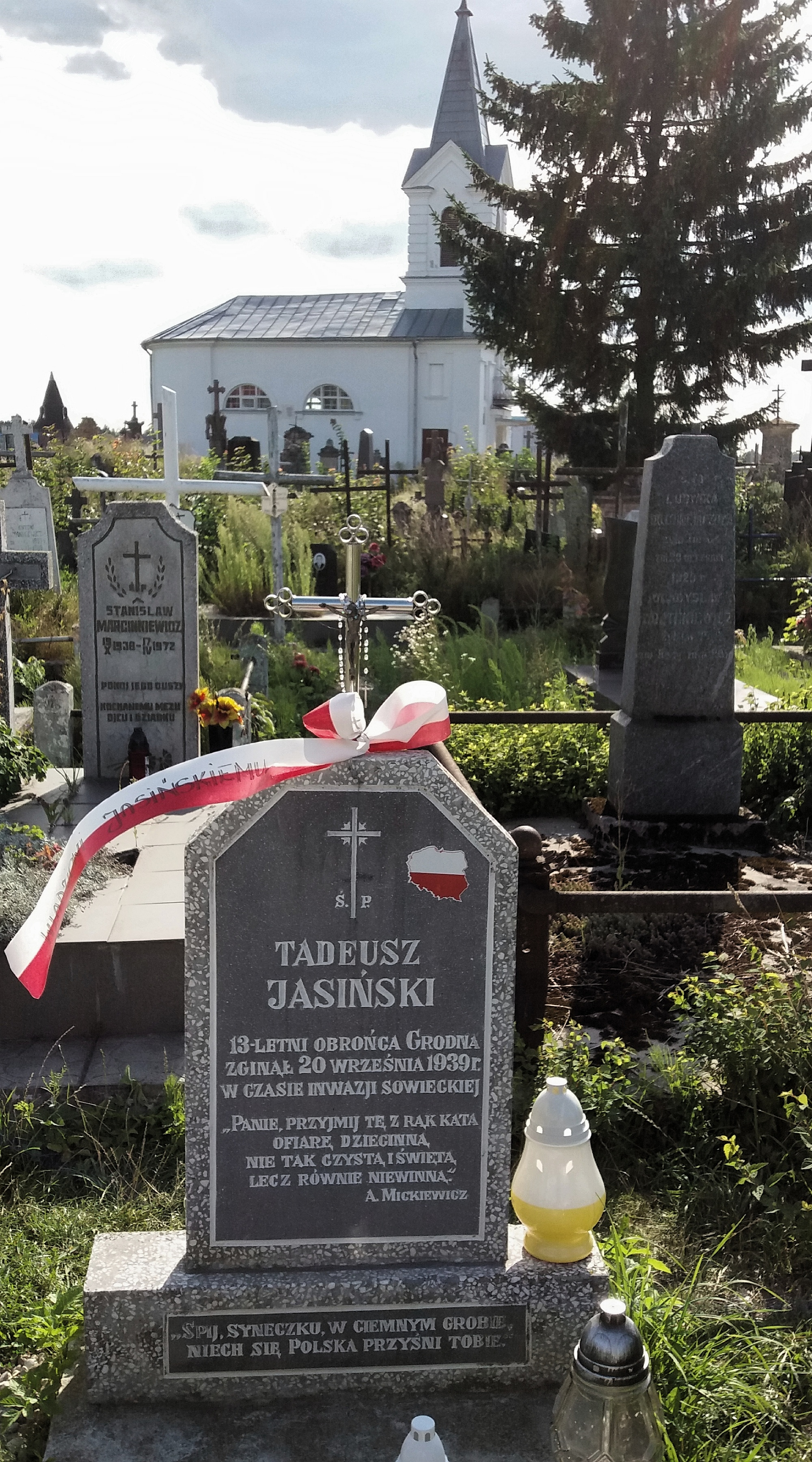
Grave

Tadeusz Jasiński (1926 – 21 September 1939, in Grodno) was a Polish soldier notable for being one of the youngest defenders of Grodno in September 1939, captured and used by the Soviets as a "human shield".

== Biography ==
Tadeusz's existence is corroborated by records of the Belarusian archive. However, there are conflicting accounts concerning his age (from an adult to thirteen years old) and the exact details of his death.

When the Red Army approached the city, Tadeusz volunteered to defend it. He was tasked with setting a Soviet tank on fire using a Molotov cocktail, but was captured in the attempt. The Soviet tank crews beat him up and, as punishment, tied him outside the tank as a "human shield". The Poles managed to recapture him and take him away from the battlefield, but he died due to his injuries. Sources are contradictory on whether he died that he died in his mother’s arms, or in the arms of one of the soldiers who rescued him (Lipińska’s).

== Remembrance ==
The name of Tadeusz Jasiński first became known after the publication of the Lipińska's memoirs in the events in Grodno, “Jeśli zapomnę o nich…” (“If I forget about them…”) in 1988 in Paris. However, the story's veracity was not confirmed by any other sources, which led some to question it. During research into his life another version of the story emerged, stating that he was killed by Germans, not the Soviets. According to Marcin Zwolski of the Sybir Remembrance Museum, that version is unlikely to be correct, as Germans never reached Grodno in 1939, and that story was changed for safety during the era of communist Poland, when criticizing Soviets led to repression from the authorities. Other discrepancies in since recovered stories concern Jasiński date of birth (c. 1928) and a claim that he succeeded in destroying a Soviet tank. Nonetheless, the basic facts about his life and death are accepted by most Polish researchers and authorities.

In October 2006, the Wrocław City Council named one of the city's boulevards "Tadek Jasiński Boulevard". In 2010, streets in Sochaczew and Kędzierzyn-Koźle were named after him, and in 2017 in Białystok. In 2007, a symbolic grave of Jasiński was erected near the headquarters of the Polish Army. On 14 September 2009, he was posthumously awarded the Commander's Cross of the Order of Polonia Restituta by the President of Poland, for heroism shown during the defense of Grodno in 1939.
