= Pęcice =

- Village
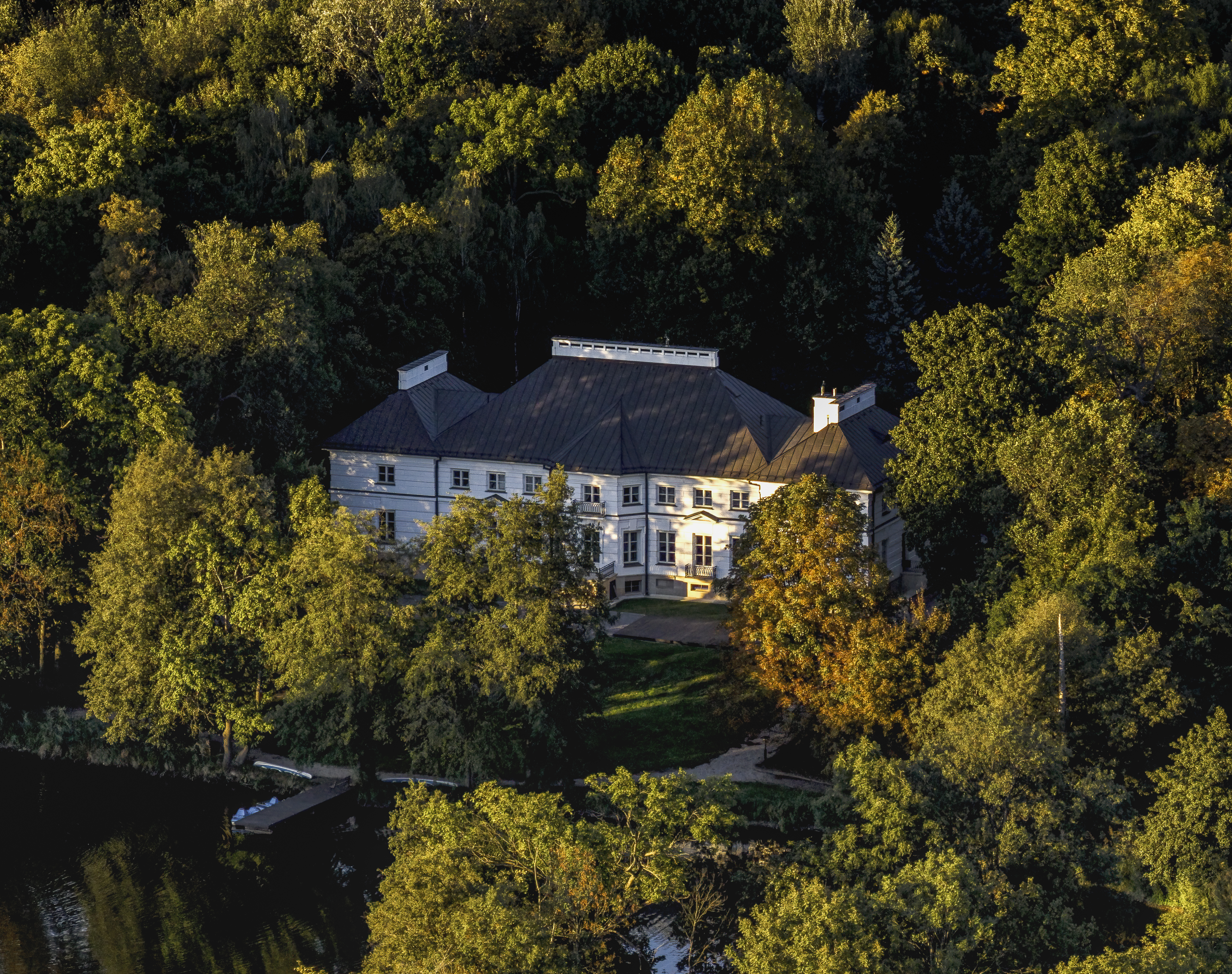
- Pęcice Palace

- Location within Poland
- Coordinates: 52°9′N 20°51′E
- Country: Poland
- Voivodeship: Masovian
- County: Pruszków
- Gmina: Michałowice

Population
  - Total: 120
- Time zone: UTC+1 (CET)
  - Summer (DST): UTC+2 (CEST)
- Vehicle registration: WPR

Pęcice [pɛnˈt͡ɕit͡sɛ] is a village in the administrative district of Gmina Michałowice, within Pruszków County, Masovian Voivodeship, in central Poland.

== History ==
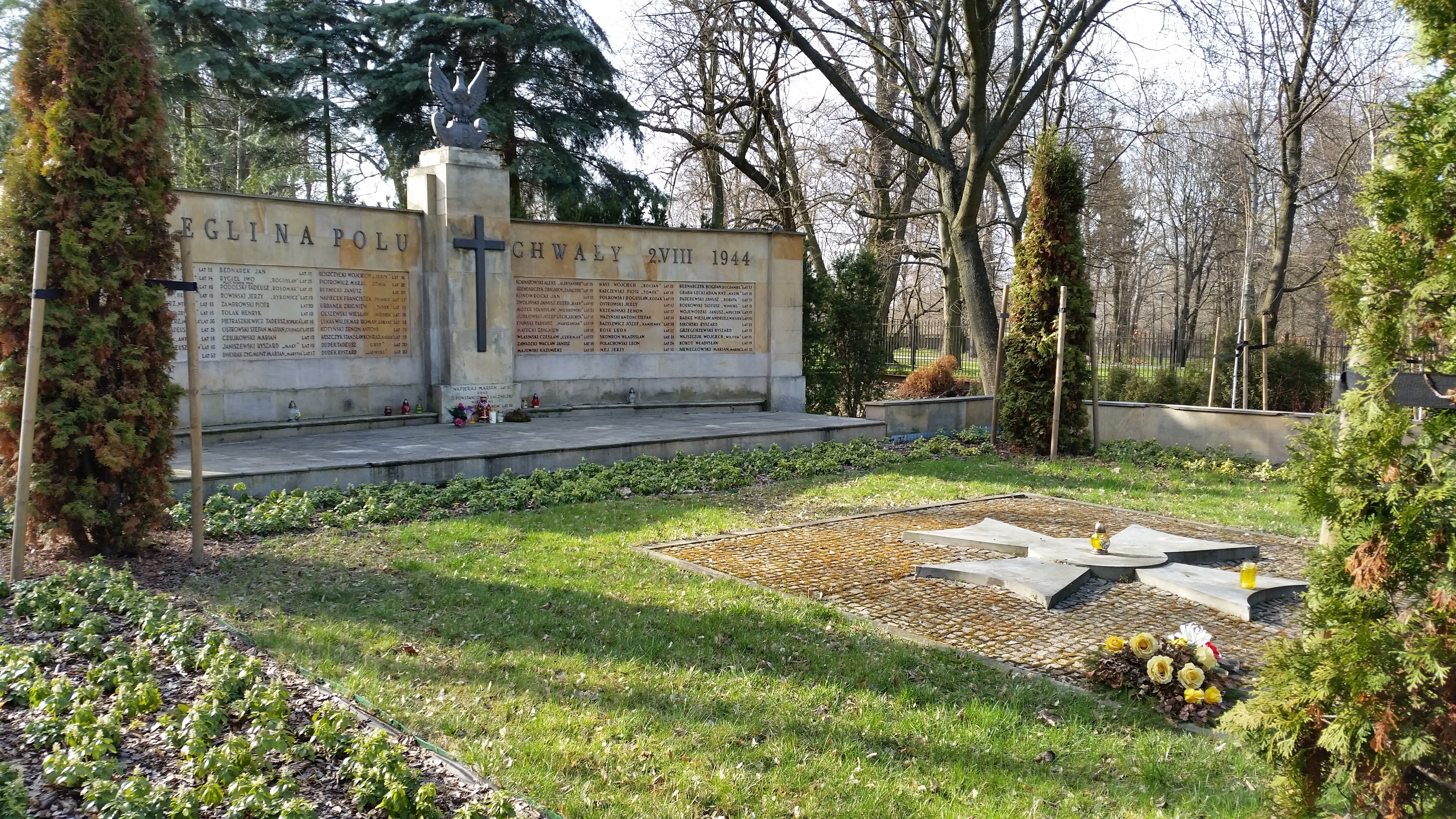
Memorial to the victims of the battle and massacre of 1944

In 1827, the village had a population of 268.

During German occupation of Poland in World War II, on 2 August 1944, it was the location of the Battle of Pęcice between the Polish resistance and German occupiers. The Germans committed a massacre of 65 captured Polish partisans, including five women, at the local park. Over 20 people survived the massacre. 40 of the 91 Poles who were either killed in action or massacred after the battle were under the age of 20, the youngest was 14. After the war ended, a memorial was unveiled at the site in 1946.

== Sights ==
The local landmarks are the Neoclassical Pęcice Palace, the Saints Peter and Paul church and the monument to soldiers of the Home Army, who were either killed in action or massacred after the Battle of Pęcice in 1944.
