= Andrzej Krauze =

British-Polish writer and artist

- Born: 7 March 1947 (age 79); Dawidy Bankowe, Poland
- Education: Academy of Fine Arts in Warsaw
- Known for: Cartoon, drawing, illustration, caricature, painting, poster design, satire
- Awards: Victoria and Albert Museum Award for Illustration (1996); Ranan Lurie Political Cartoon Award (2002–03)
- Website: andrzejkrauze.com

Andrzej Krauze (born 7 March 1947) is a Polish-born British cartoonist, illustrator, caricaturist, painter, poster designer and satirist noted for his allegorical, fabulous, symbolic and sometimes scary imagery, as well as his reliance on black ink, bold lines and cross-hatching. His illustrations have been a regular fixture in the British national daily newspaper The Guardian since 1989, and he has also contributed to the English-language newspapers and magazines The New York Times, The Sunday Telegraph, The Times, International Herald Tribune, New Scientist, The Independent on Sunday, The Bookseller, New Statesman, Modern Painters, Campaign, The Listener, New Society and Story Teller. He won the Victoria and Albert Museum Award for Illustration in 1996, and the Ranan Lurie Political Cartoon Award in 2003.

== Life and career ==
=== Early life and career in Poland ===
Andrzej Krauze was born in Dawidy Bankowe, a village on the outskirts of Warsaw, Poland, on 7 March 1947. His father was a small trader and there was no artistic tradition in the family. But his elder brother Antoni had become a film director and Krauze intended to follow him. Film school demanded a degree, so Krauze, who had always loved drawing, began studying painting and illustration at the Academy of Fine Arts in Warsaw in 1967. In 1971, while still a student, he started contributing cartoons to the Polish satirical magazine Szpilki and won first prize in a poster design competition organised by the National Theatre in Warsaw for whom he then worked as a poster designer until 1973, when he graduated. His diploma submission, an animated film entitled The Flying Lesson, was suppressed as anti-Polish and not shown publicly until 2010, but his growing success marked the end of his original ambition to become a film director, and, after graduating, he continued contributing to Szpilki and began working as a political cartoonist for the weekly magazine Kultura. Many of his cartoons were censored, but Krauze found this a creative challenge and spent the next six years irritating the censors and entertaining his readers. "He was a cult artist," recalled Wojciech Chmurzynski, director of Warsaw's Museum of Caricature, in 2001: "He was very important to [Polish] people in the 1970s, and his ... cartoons were universally known." Zuzanna Lipinska, daughter of the Museum of Caricature's founder, agrees: "Cartoons were important because there were a lot of things that couldn't be said directly, so people had to find metaphorical ways of saying them. [Krauze] was expressing the younger generation's discontent with the regime... He caught the tragicomic reality of Poland; the absurdity of Polish life."

=== Career in Europe and move to London ===
By the end of the 1970s, Krauze decided to try his luck abroad. He continued to contribute to Kultura, but in 1979 he moved to Paris and, after only a month, to London. After a year there, however, the Home Office refused to extend his visa, forcing him to move to Amsterdam in 1980, where he worked as an illustrator for the Dutch newspaper NRC Handelsblad. From Amsterdam he moved back to Paris once again, where he contributed to the French magazines L'Express, L'Expansion and Lire in 1981. When martial law was declared in Poland in December 1981, he was once again in London organising an exhibition of his drawings. As he later recalled, "I said to myself, if I am a political cartoonist, this is my time. I only had a one-week tourist visa to begin with, but after martial law I published a lot of drawings in English, American and French newspapers, and immediately it was impossible to return [to Poland]. The borders were closed, it was very difficult to send journalists to Poland, there were no photographs coming out, and I was one of the few artists who could draw without fear."

=== Career in Great Britain ===
Krauze remained in London and became a British citizen. Between 1986 and 1990 he designed posters for London's Old Vic theatre, then under the directorship of Jonathan Miller, and began contributing cartoons and illustrations to the New Statesman in 1988, The Guardian in 1989, and The Independent on Sunday in 1990. He has also contributed to the English-language newspapers and magazines The New York Times, The Sunday Telegraph, The Times, International Herald Tribune, New Scientist, The Bookseller, Modern Painters, Campaign, The Listener, New Society and Story Teller. He won the Victoria and Albert Museum Award for Illustration in 1996, was appointed external examiner by the Royal College of Art in 1997, and was awarded the Ranan Lurie Political Cartoon Award by the United Nations Correspondents Association in 2003.

=== Return to Poland ===
In 2001, Krauze returned to Poland as an artist for the first time in 20 years, with a critically acclaimed exhibition in the Museum of Caricature, Warsaw, attended by the British ambassador and the celebrated Polish film director Andrzej Wajda among others. He has since been widely published in Polish newspapers and weeklies, such as Rzeczpospolita and wSieci, as well as regularly having notable exhibitions in Warsaw.

In 2017, he was honoured with the President Lech Kaczynski Award for outstanding contributions to Polish art and culture, along with his brother, film director Antoni Krauze, at the VII Congress of the Polish Great Project in Warsaw. Andrzej Krauze was further named a laureate of Polish art and awarded the Gold Medal for Merit to Culture – Gloria Artis, which is the highest distinction that the Minister of Culture can give to an artist on behalf of the Polish Republic.

Krauze lives in London. He continues to have his work published widely in both England and Poland and has recently exhibited in Warsaw and Tuscany.

== Critical responses to work ==
Cultural historian Patrick Wright, whose book On Living in an Old Country (1985) Krauze illustrated, recalls of Krauze's early work that it was "like nothing else in Britain at that time... Many of [his drawings] were defiantly crude onslaughts, which used strong ink lines and ferocious cross-hatching to emphasise the violence of the Communist state and then hurl it back in the face of the regime... [H]is eye seemed harsher, and sometimes frankly disrespectful of the foibles and eccentricities of British life. His drawings lacked the cool 'designer' cynicism of an age increasingly defined by advertising imagery... [He was] an illustrator with a more distanced eye than was customary in English illustration."

Alan Rusbridger, editor of The Guardian, has similarly commented that Krauze "helped introduce an intelligence and sophistication into serious British illustration."

Journalist Francis Wheen has written of Krauze that "whatever [his] subject ... his ironic, cosmopolitan intelligence never fails to enlighten... Krauze can do caricatures and jokes, of course, but his real genius lies in the creation of vivid metaphor... absurd, sometimes scary imagery that owes more to writers such as Bulgakov or Alfred Jarry than to Jak or Mac... this is a man who both works hard and thinks hard, as proved by his dozens of brilliantly apt drawings in the book Introducing The Enlightenment [2000]... Krauze is both an artist and an intellectual; but he wears his learning lightly. Like all good intellectuals, he keeps Occam's razor within easy reach, ready to slash through obfuscation and reveal a plain truth in all its simplicity – or perhaps one should say 'in black and white', since he employs black ink more tellingly than any other illustrator I know... this remarkable artist has always accepted the duty that is more traditionally assigned to journalists, though many of them prefer to duck the challenge: he speaks truth to power."

== Selected books illustrated by Andrzej Krauze ==
- Krauze, Andrzej (1977). Nowość: Szczęście w aerozolu [New: Spray-on happiness] (in Polish). Czytelnik.
- Krauze, Andrzej (1980). Lubta mnie: Wybór rysunków z lat 1976–78 [Luv me: Selected Drawings 1976–78] (in Polish). Czytelnik. ISBN 8307001226.
- Krauze, Andrzej; Mikes, George (1981). Andrzej Krauze's Poland. Nina Karsov. ISBN 978-0907652014.
- Krauze, Andrzej (1982). A year of martial law. Kontakt.
- Krauze, Andrzej (1983). Coming Back to the West. Larson.
- Landry, Charles; Marley, David; Southwood, Russel; Wright, Patrick (1985). What a Way to Run a Railroad. Comedia. ISBN 978-0906890806.
- Wright, Patrick (1985). On Living in an Old Country. Verso Books. ISBN 978-0805272659.
- Spencer, Lloyd; Krauze, Andrzej (2000). Introducing The Enlightenment. Totem Books. ISBN 1840461179.
- Krauze, Andrzej (2003). Drawings 1970–2003. The Guardian.
- Kelly, Stuart (2005). The Book of Lost Books. Random House. ISBN 1-4000-6297-7.
- Krauze, Andrzej (2010). The Sleep of Reason... Drawings 1970–1989. Instytut Pamięci Narodowej. ISBN 978-83-7629-129-1.
- Krauze, Andrzej (2011). III wieża Babel w budowie. [The third tower of Babel under construction] (in Polish). Zysk I S-Ka Wydawnictwo. ISBN 978-8375069228.
- Krauze, Andrzej (2020). Pan Pióro. [Mr. Pen] (in Polish). Państwowy Instytut Wydawniczy & Zachęta. ISBN 978-83-8196-030-4.

=== Children's books ===
- Krauze, Andrzej; Górzański, Jerzy (1978). Zwierzęta pana Krauzego [Mr Krauze's animals] (in Polish). Czytelnik.
- Patten, Brian (1982). Słoń i kwiat (Polish translation of The Elephant and the Flower). Krajowa Agencja Wydawnicza.
- Krauze, Andrzej (1984). What's So Special About Today? Hodder Children's Books. ISBN 0-688-02835-7.
- Krauze, Andrzej (1985). Reggie Rabbit Plants a Garden. Macmillan. ISBN 978-0027509601.
- Krauze, Andrzej (1985). Ellie Elephant Builds a House. Macmillan. ISBN 978-0027509700.
- Krauze, Andrzej (1985). Christopher Crocodile Cooks a Meal. Macmillan. ISBN 0-02-750980-X.
- Rosen, Michael, editor (1990). Culture Shock. Viking. ISBN 0-670-83161-1.
- Rosen, Michael (1994). Action Replay. Puffin Books. ISBN 978-0140347395.
- Seltsam, Oskar (pseudonym of Alexandra Bernhardt): Mit 20 Tieren um die Welt. Gedichte (With 20 animals around the world. Poems). Illustrated by Andrzej Krauze. Edition Melos, Vienna 2022, ISBN 978-3-9505056-2-7.
