= Janki, Pruszków County =

Janki
- Village
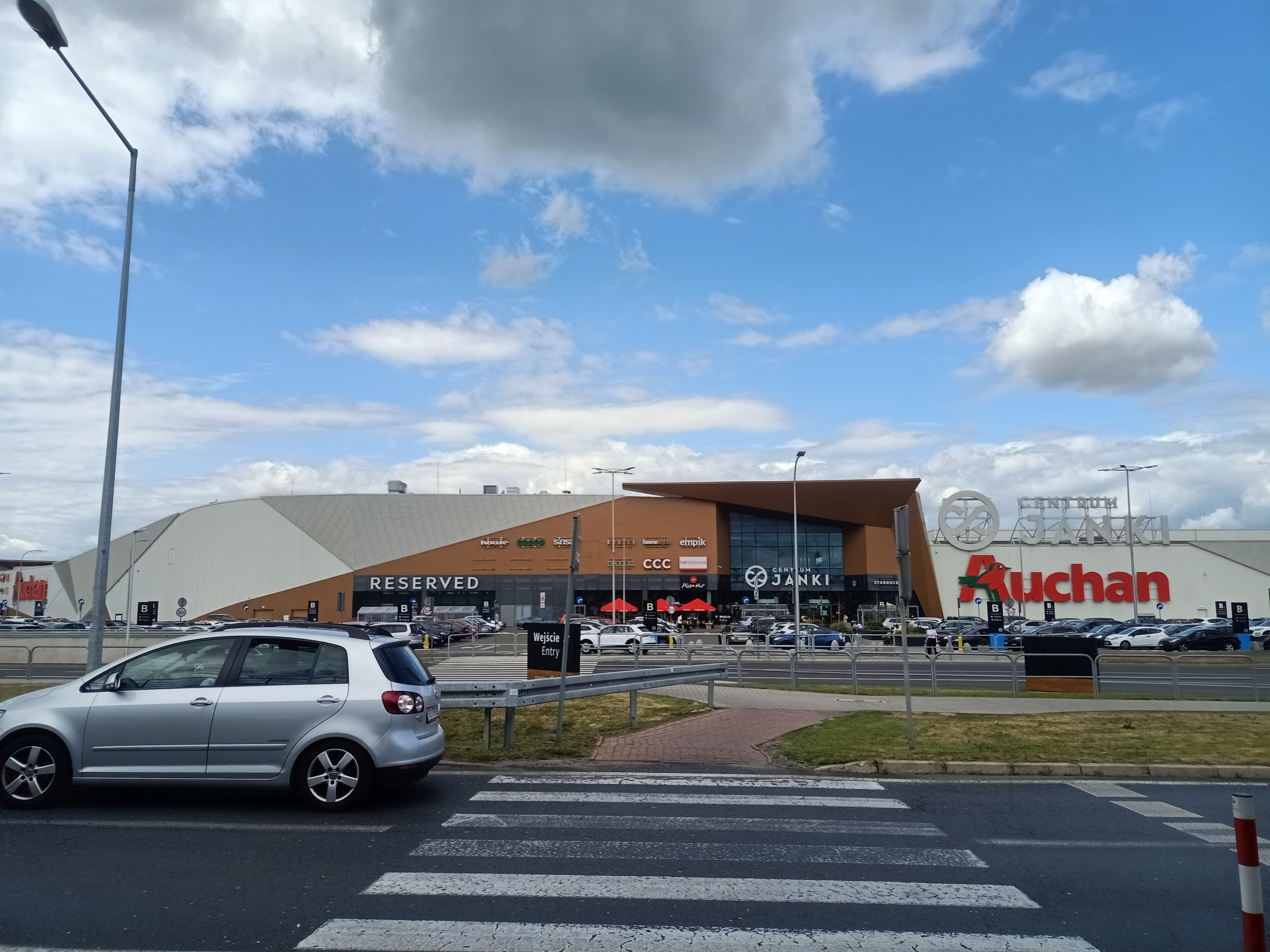
- Shopping mall in Janki

- Location within Poland
- Coordinates: 52°7′44″N 20°53′55″E
- Country: Poland
- Voivodeship: Masovian
- County: Pruszków
- Gmina: Raszyn

Population
  - Total: 790
- Time zone: UTC+1 (CET)
  - Summer (DST): UTC+2 (CEST)

Janki (Polish pronunciation: [ˈjanki]) is a village in the administrative district of Gmina Raszyn, within Pruszków County, Masovian Voivodeship, in east-central Poland. It is part of the Warsaw metropolitan area.

Janki was part of a larger noble estate centered in nearby Falenty.
