= Puchały, Pruszków County =

Puchały
- Village
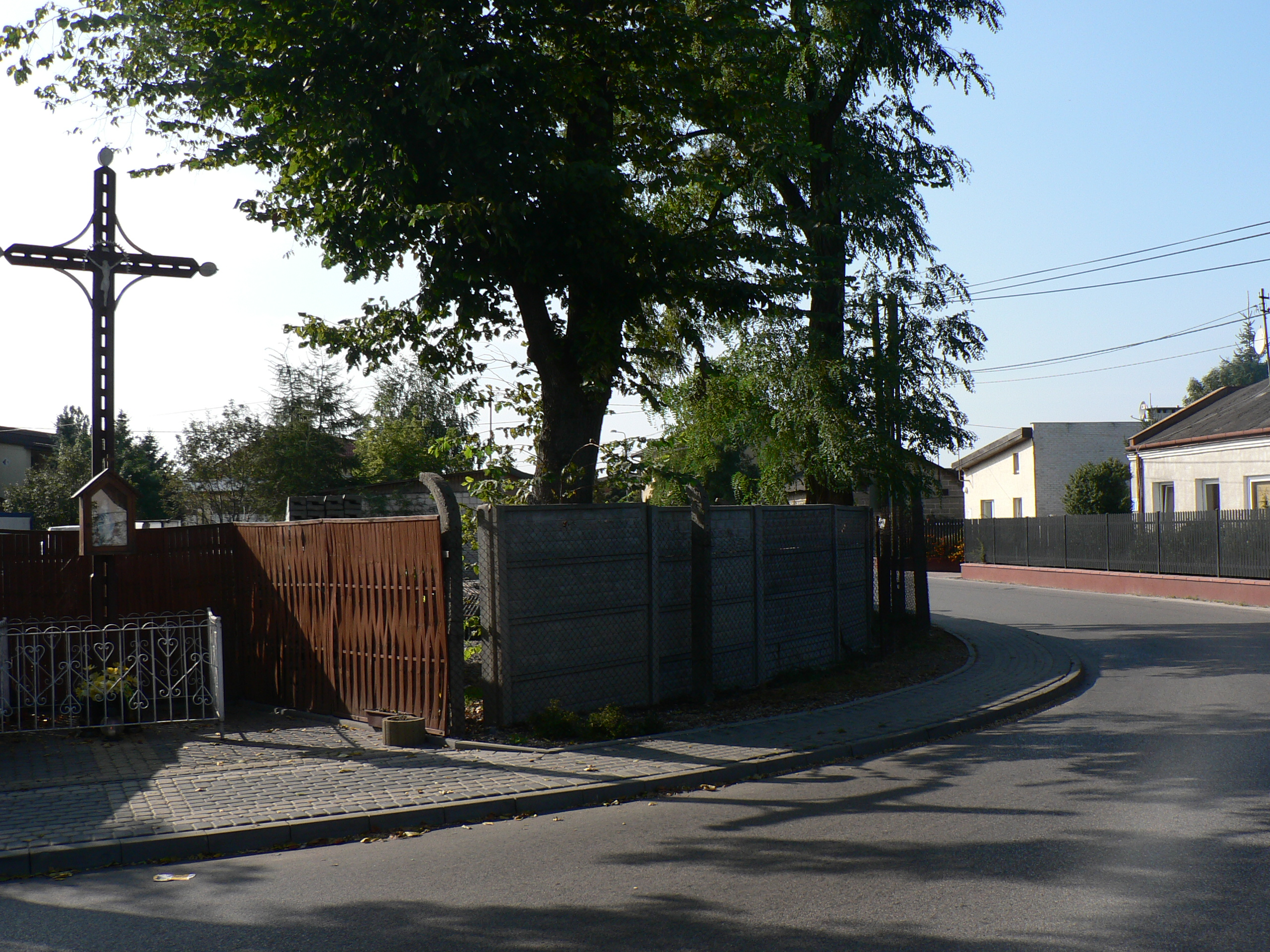

- Location within Poland
- Coordinates: 52°8′59″N 20°54′3″E
- Country: Poland
- Voivodeship: Masovian
- County: Pruszków
- Gmina: Raszyn

Population
  - Total: 266
- Time zone: UTC+1 (CET)
  - Summer (DST): UTC+2 (CEST)

Puchały [puˈxawɨ] is a village in the administrative district of Gmina Raszyn, within Pruszków County, Masovian Voivodeship, in east-central Poland. It is part of the Warsaw metropolitan area.

Puchały was part of a larger noble estate centered in nearby Falenty.
