= Antoni Krauze =

Polish film director and screenwriter

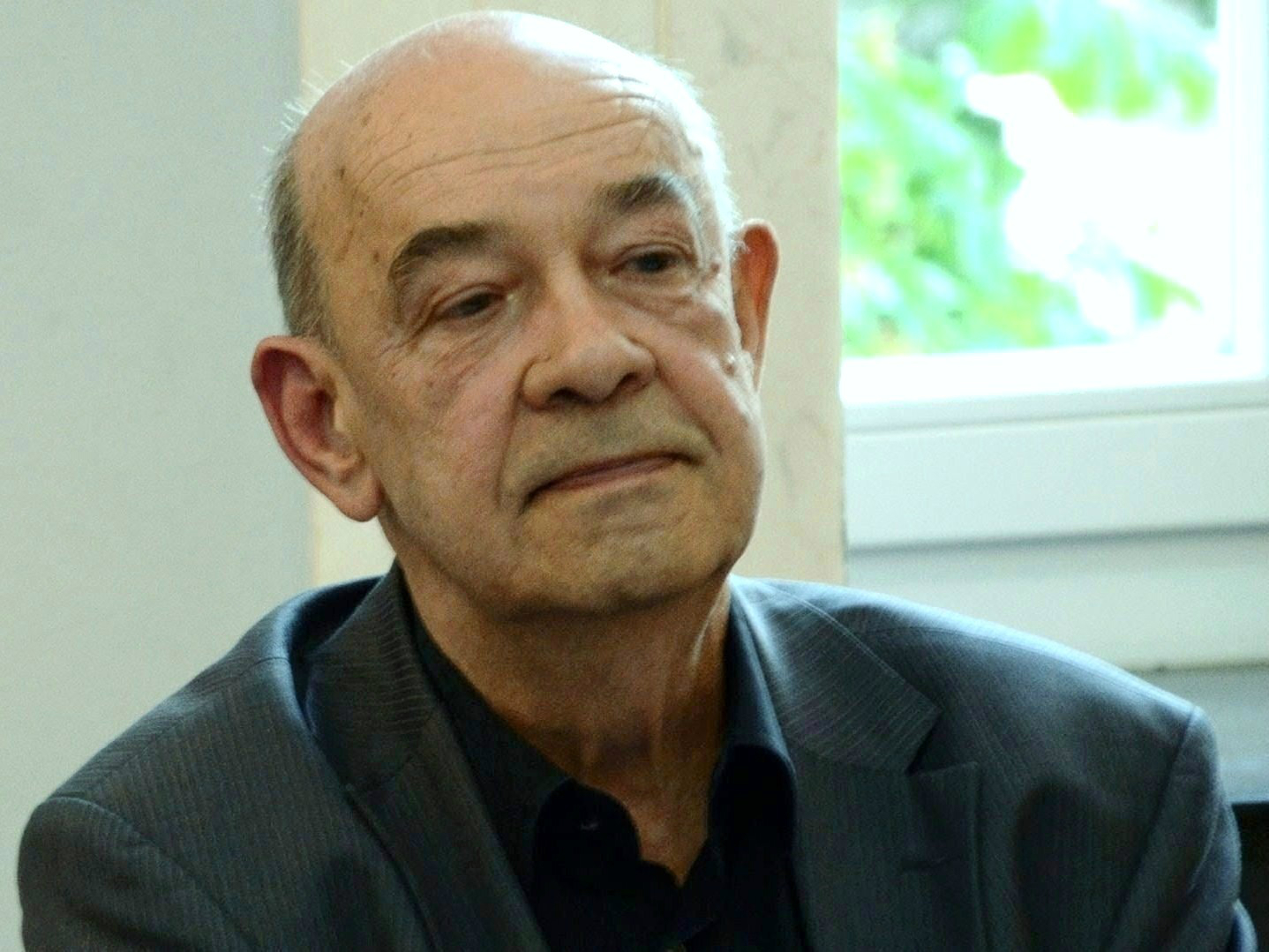
- Born: 4 January 1940; Warsaw, Poland
- Died: 14 February 2018 (aged 78); Warsaw, Poland
- Occupations: film director, screenwriter
- Awards: Order of Polonia Restituta; Medal for Merit to Culture – Gloria Artis

Antoni Krauze (4 January 1940 – 14 February 2018) was a Polish screenwriter and director.

== Early life ==
Antoni Krauze was born on 4 January 1940 in Warsaw, Poland. He studied filmmaking at the National Film School in Łódź (1966). He was the older brother of cartoonist and illustrator Andrzej Krauze.

== Career ==
Krauze directed many documentaries and feature films for example Monidlo and The Aquarium. His 2011 film, Black Thursday won Special Award at the Polish Film Festival in 2011 and FIPRESCI Prize at the Montréal World Film Festival in 2011.

== Death ==
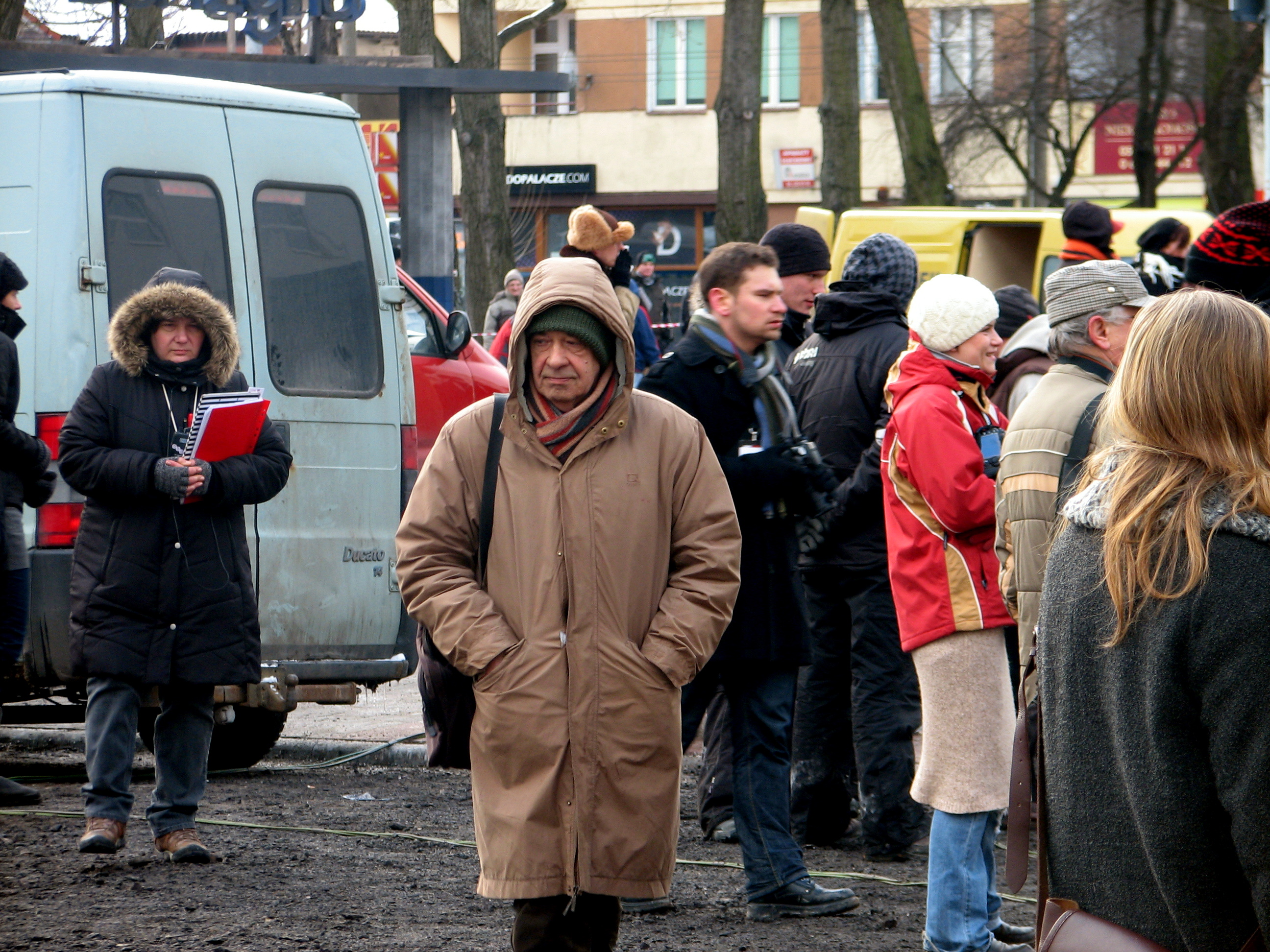
Antoni Krauze in 2010 (Filmmaking of "Black Thursday").

Krauze died on 14 February 2018 of a heart attack at the age of 78.

== Filmography ==
Year	Title	Director	Writer
1973	Palec boży	Yes	Yes
1975	Strach	Yes	No
1979	Podróż do Arabii	Yes	Yes
1980	Party przy świecach	Yes	No
1982	Prognoza pogody	Yes	Yes
1988	Dziewczynka z hotelu Excelsior	Yes	No
2005	Radość pisania	Yes	Yes
2011	Black Thursday	Yes	No
2016	Smolensk	Yes	Yes
