= Słomin, Pruszków County =

Słomin
- Village
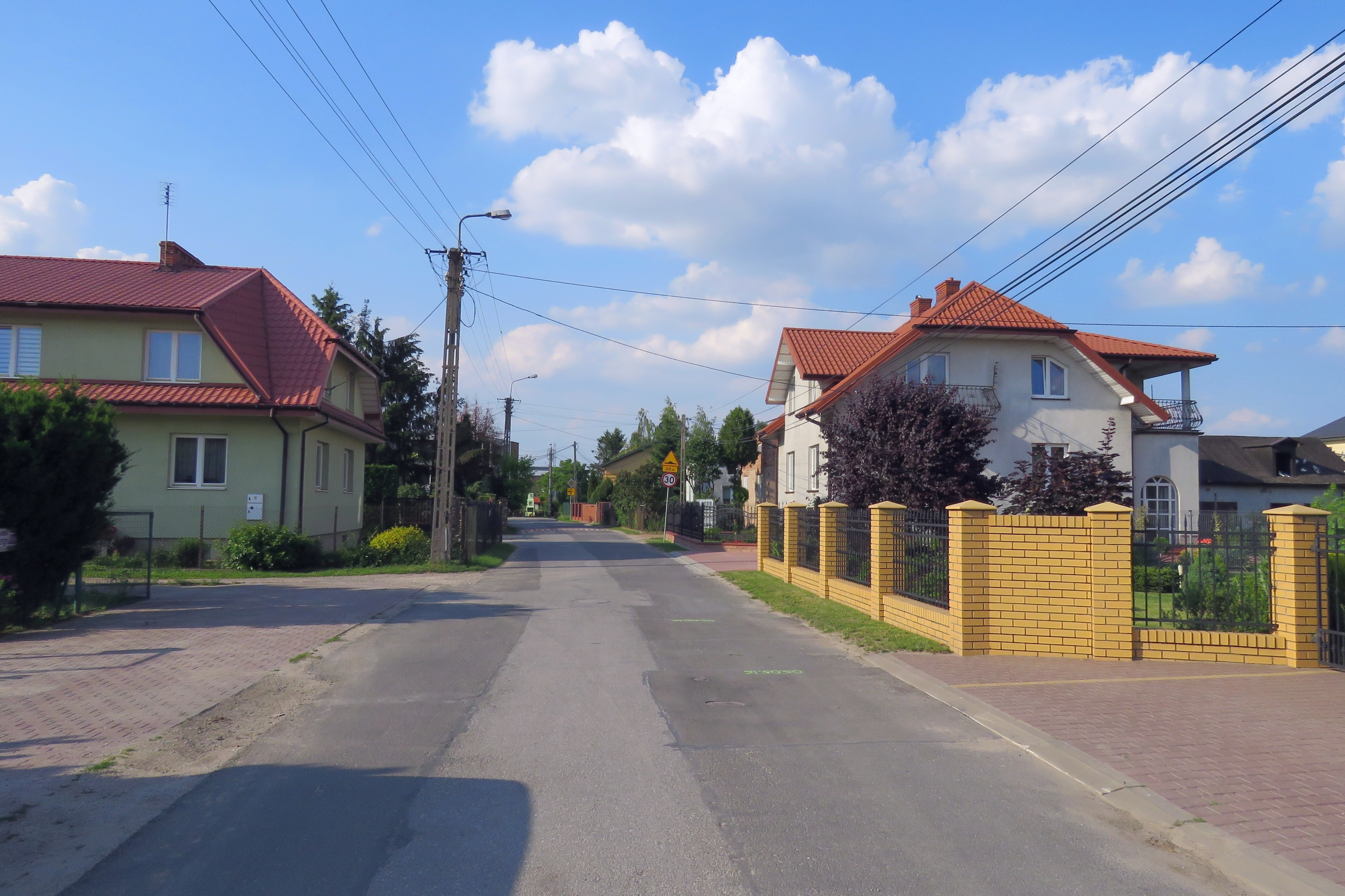

- Location within Poland
- Coordinates: 52°6′33″N 20°53′40″E
- Country: Poland
- Voivodeship: Masovian
- County: Pruszków
- Gmina: Raszyn
- Population: 409

Słomin [ˈswɔmin] is a village in the administrative district of Gmina Raszyn, within Pruszków County, Masovian Voivodeship, in east-central Poland.
