= Smolensk (film) =

- Film poster
- Polish: Smoleńsk
- Directed by: Antoni Krauze
- Written by: Antoni Krauze; Tomasz Lysiak; Maciej Pawlicki; Marcin Wolski
- Cinematography: Michal Pakulski
- Edited by: Milosz Janiec
- Music by: Michal Lorenc
- Production company: Fundacja Smolensk 2010
- Distributed by: Kino Swiat
- Release date: 5 September 2016 (Poland)
- Running time: 120 min

Smolensk (Polish: Smoleńsk) is a Polish drama thriller film directed by Antoni Krauze released in September 2016, in his final film before his death in 2018.

Ostensibly about the Smolensk air disaster, the film is considered one of the worst films of all time and received negative reviews from the Polish press, who criticized its chaotic script and editing, poor acting, poorly written character roles, the propagandist tone of the plot, and promotion of conspiracy theories regarding the disaster, with some deeming it insulting to the families of the victims.

== Storyline ==
The film's plot focuses on the 2010 Smolensk air disaster. Nina (Beata Fido), reporter for the fictional Polish television station TVM-SAT, conducts an investigation of the disaster. Initially, she is sceptical about the political assassination conspiracy theory but her attitude changes as the story progresses due to the interviews she conducts with the families of the victims, including the widow of General Andrzej Błasik and the parents of one of the pilots. As she begins to raise the same questions as the supporters of the assassination theory in her materials, she is reprimanded by her boss. Nina becomes even more convinced that a conspiracy took place after discovering she had been deceived about a supposed argument between General Błasik and the crew before take-off. Nina claims on air that she has spoken to credible witnesses on the matter; it is later revealed that no such argument took place.

After the official Polish report of the crash is published, the camera operator, who is a close friend of Nina, states that the assumptions made in the report are irrational. Later, Nina learns that key witnesses in the crash all individually died by suicide in isolated places. Nina also meets with a right-wing Polish journalist and goes to Chicago, USA to speak with American journalists. During a meeting with the Gazeta Polska Club in the USA, she meets other supporters of the assassination theory and learns about a possible explosion that supposedly took place on the aircraft. In the end, she does not learn who is responsible for the crash or how the explosives ended up on board.

The results of Nina's investigation are left to the viewer's interpretation based on excerpts from the flight, which are shown during the second half of the film. The plane's take-off is shown, alongside conversations between the pilots and the interactions between passengers on board. During a critical moment, the pilot attempts to pull up, but the aircraft does not respond to his commands, and an explosion occurs on the wing. The plane is engulfed in fire and hits the ground. After the crash, ghosts of victims of the Katyn massacre salute in front of the ghosts of the Polish President and his wife.

The film's ending features a demonstration of supporters of the assassination theory in Krakowskie Przedmieście in Warsaw.

== Cast ==
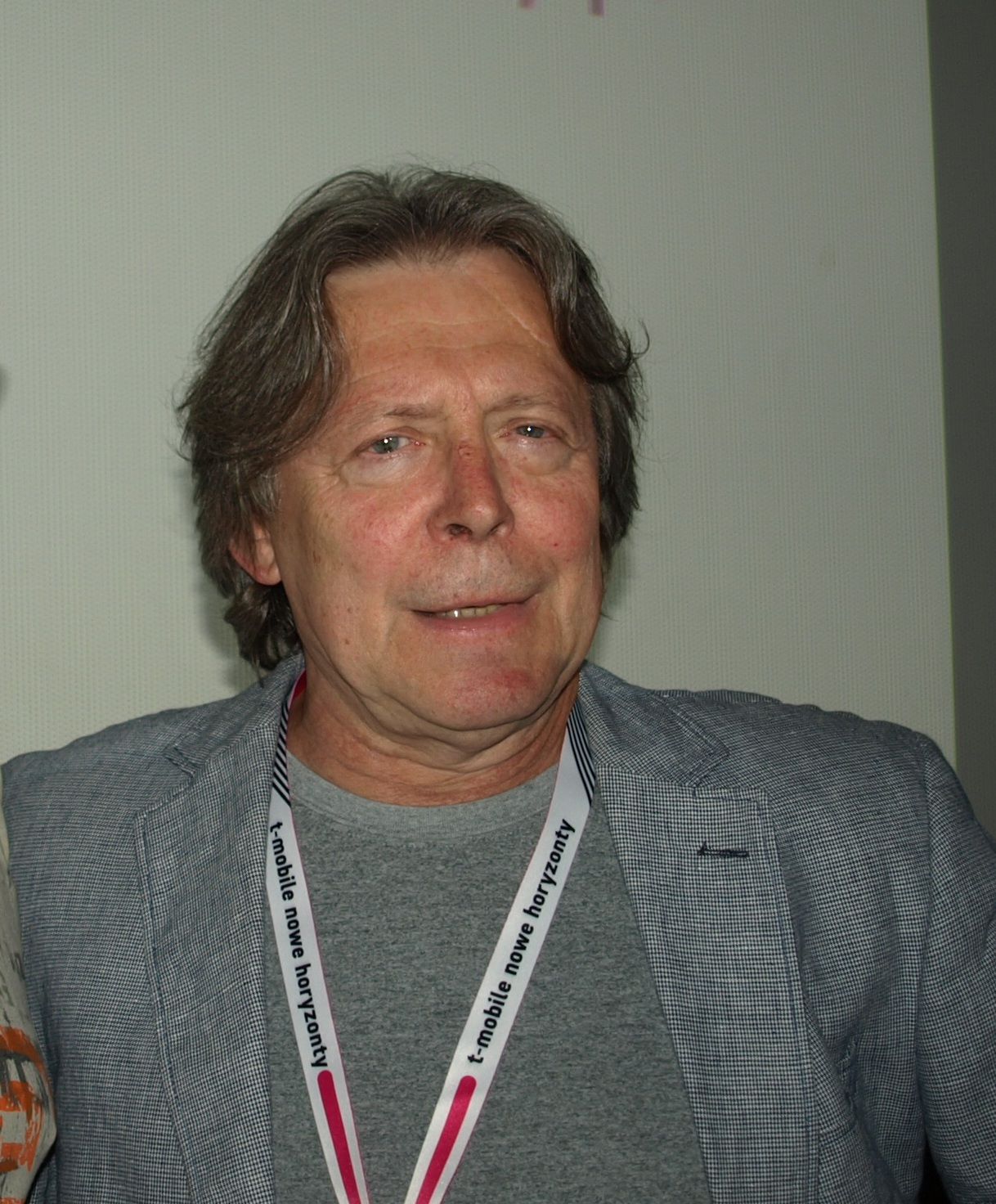
Lech Łotocki as Lech Kaczyński

- Beata Fido as Nina, a fictional journalist conducting an investigation of the Smolensk air disaster.
- Redbad Klynstra-Komarnicki as editor-in-chief of fictional television station TVM-SAT.
- Lech Łotocki as former President of Poland Lech Kaczyński.
- Ewa Dałkowska as First Lady of Poland Maria Kaczyńska.
- Witold Żaboklicki as General Andrzej Błasik, then-Commander of the Polish Air Force
- Maciej Góraj as Nina's father.
- Halina Łabonarska as Nina's mother.
- Aldona Struzik as Ewa Błasik, wife of General Andrzej Błasik.
- Maciej Brzoska as commander of Tu-154.

== Reception ==
The film received extremely negative reviews and is considered one of the worst films ever made.

As of 2026, Smolensk had a rating of 1.2 out of 10 on IMDb, making it one of the lowest rated movies of all time. The film got seven Snake Award anti-awards: Worst film, Worst director, Worst screenplay, Embarrassing film on an important subject, Worst actress, Worst film duo, Most embarrassing scene.

Common criticisms of Smolensk by Polish critics included its chaotic script and editing, poor acting, poorly written character roles, and propaganda nature. Many critics also cited factual inaccuracies and found it insulting to the surviving families. The promotion of conspiracy theories about the disaster led to some comparing it unfavorably to Oliver Stone's JFK. The Polish entertainment website NaEkranie.pl described Smolensk's screenplay as "painfully heavy-handed" and compared special effects to that of "Sharknado without sharks" and the editing to Ed Wood's films.

The premiere of the film was attended by President Andrzej Duda, Prime Minister Beata Szydlo and Jarosław Kaczyński, brother of President Lech Kaczyński who had died in the crash.
