= Nowe Grocholice =

- Village
- Location within Poland
- Coordinates: 52°9′26″N 20°54′30″E
- Country: Poland
- Voivodeship: Masovian
- County: Pruszków
- Gmina: Raszyn
- Population: 1,317

Nowe Grocholice [ˈnɔvɛ ɡrɔxɔˈlit͡sɛ] is a village in the administrative district of Gmina Raszyn, within Pruszków County, Masovian Voivodeship, in east-central Poland.
