= Jaworowa =

- Village
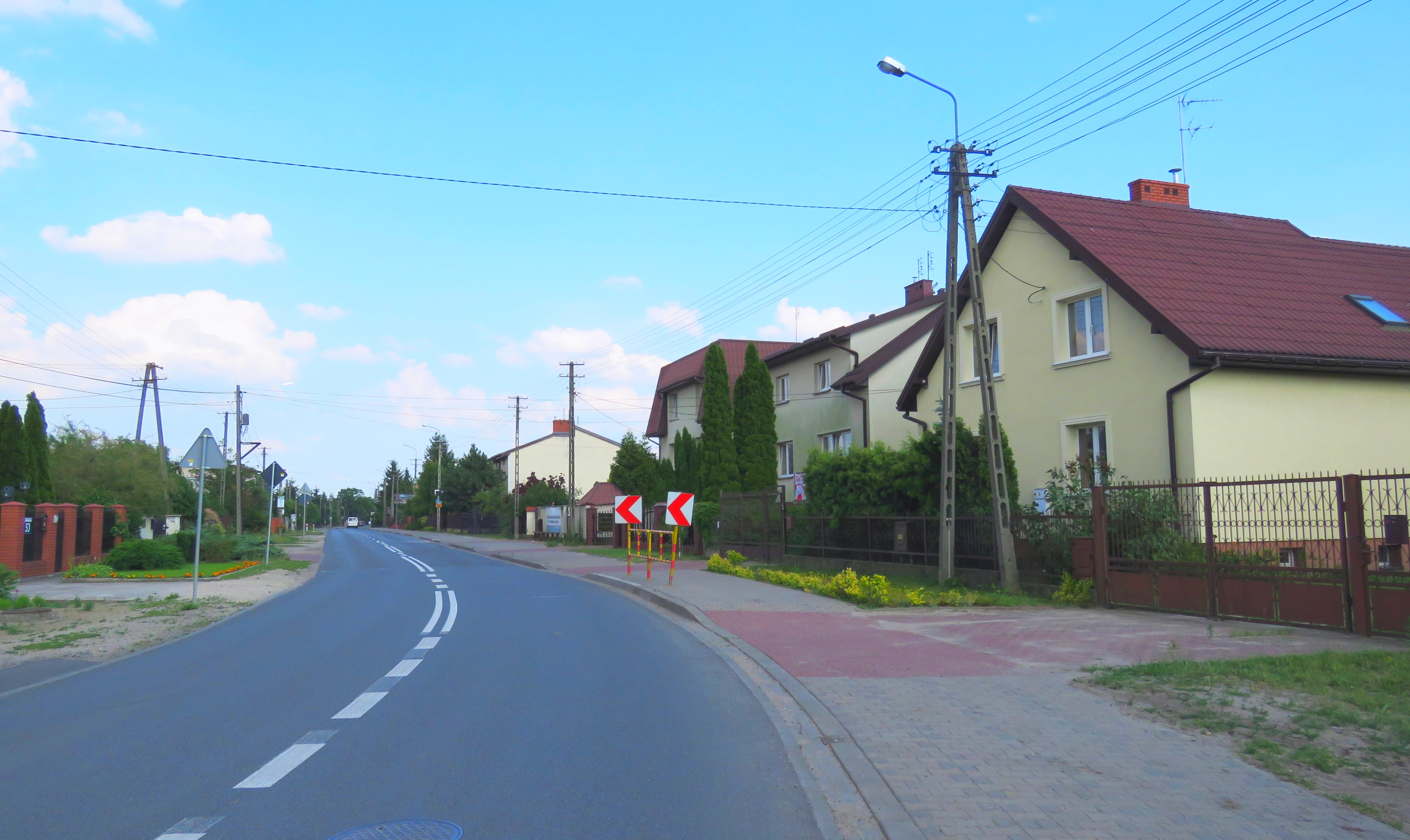

- Location within Poland
- Coordinates: 52°8′42″N 20°57′7″E
- Country: Poland
- Voivodeship: Masovian
- County: Pruszków
- Gmina: Raszyn
- Population: 750

Jaworowa [javɔˈrɔva] is a village in the administrative district of Gmina Raszyn, within Pruszków County, Masovian Voivodeship, in east-central Poland.
