= Beata Fido =

Polish actress

Beata Fido (born 2 November 1967) is a Polish actress.

Beata moved to Kraków, Poland at a young age. In 1990 she graduated from the Ludwik Solski National Theatrical School. In 1991 she moved to the United States where she performed at several theaters, the last in 1997. After returning home she starred both in TV series such as Klan and Komisarz Alex.

In 2015, she played the reporter Nina, the starring role, in Smoleńsk. From 2016, she played Marta Grabska, a police officer, in Komisarz Alex.
