= Snake Award =

Polish film anti-award

The Snake Award (Polish: Wąż) is the Polish ironic anti-award for the worst cinematographic failures in Polish cinema, similar to the Golden Raspberry Awards. It is awarded annually for the previous year. The first Snake Awards were held in 2012. It was named after the film Curse of Snakes Valley, a 1987 Polish-Soviet adventure film, a cheap knock-off of the Indiana Jones films, which was included in the list of 10 worst Polish films in 2002. The award was created by Polish film critic Kamil Śmiałkowski.

The award is given in several categories: "Worst film", "Worst actor", "Worst actress", etc.

== Worst films ==
- 2012: Wyjazd integracyjny
- 2013: Kac Wawa was nominated in 16 categories and won 7 of them: Worst film, Worst director, Worst screenplay, Most embarrassing scene, Unfunny comedy, Worst actor, Worst film duo
- 2014: Ostra randka
- 2015: Obce ciało
- 2016:Ostatni klaps
- 2017:Smolensk: Worst film, Worst director, Worst screenplay, Embarrassing film on an important subject, Worst actress, Worst film duo, Most embarrassing scene
- 2018:Botoks—despite its box office success, the film got nine "Snakes", everywhere where it was nominated.
- 2019:Studniówk@
- 2020:Futro z misia
- 2021:365 Days: Worst film, Worst screenplay, Worst actors' duo ("for a "dive of libido down that would make the world's greatest parachutist, Felix Baumgartner, proud)
- 2022:Ściema po polsku
- 2023:Niewidzialna wojna
- 2024: Blef doskonały (for being "a failed bluff, a brazen attempt to fool the viewer into thinking that this is what professional commercial cinema should look like")
- 2025: Quo Vadis ("an absolutely professional attempt to make the whole world disgusted with the Polish novel awarded the Nobel Prize in Literature [Quo Vadis]")
- 2026: Putin ("for a film that is almost as bad as the character it tries to tell the story about")
