= Sękocin Las =

- Metropolis
- Location within Poland
- Coordinates: 52°6′9″N 20°53′12″E
- Country: Poland
- Voivodeship: Masovian
- County: Pruszków
- Gmina: Raszyn

Sękocin Las [sɛŋˈkɔt͡ɕin ˈlas] is a village in the administrative district of Gmina Raszyn, within Pruszków County, Masovian Voivodeship, in east-central Poland.
