= Gmina Raszyn =

Gmina Raszyn Raszyn Commune
- Gmina
- Flag Coat of arms
- Interactive map of Gmina Raszyn
- Coordinates (Raszyn): 52°9′32″N 20°55′35″E
- Country: Poland
- Voivodeship: Masovian
- County: Pruszków
- Seat: Raszyn

Area
  - Total: 43.89 km^{2} (16.95 sq mi)

Population (2006)
  - Total: 19,788
  - Density: 450.9/km^{2} (1,168/sq mi)
- Website: http://www.raszyn.pl

Gmina Raszyn is a rural gmina (administrative district) in Pruszków County, Masovian Voivodeship, in east-central Poland. Its seat is the village of Raszyn, which lies approximately 9 kilometres (6 mi) east of Pruszków and 9 km (6 mi) south-west of Warsaw. Raszyn is a suburb of Warsaw.

The gmina covers an area of 43.89 square kilometres (16.9 sq mi), and as of 2006 its total population is 19,788.

== Villages ==
Gmina Raszyn contains the villages and settlements of Dawidy, Dawidy Bankowe, Falenty, Falenty Duże, Falenty Nowe, Janki, Jaworowa, Łady, Laszczki, Nowe Grocholice, Podolszyn Nowy, Puchały, Raszyn, Rybie, Sękocin Las, Sękocin Nowy, Sękocin Stary, Słomin and Wypędy.

== Neighbouring gminas ==
Gmina Raszyn is bordered by the city of Warsaw and by the gminas of Lesznowola, Michałowice and Nadarzyn.
