= Rybie, Pruszków County =

Rybie
- Village
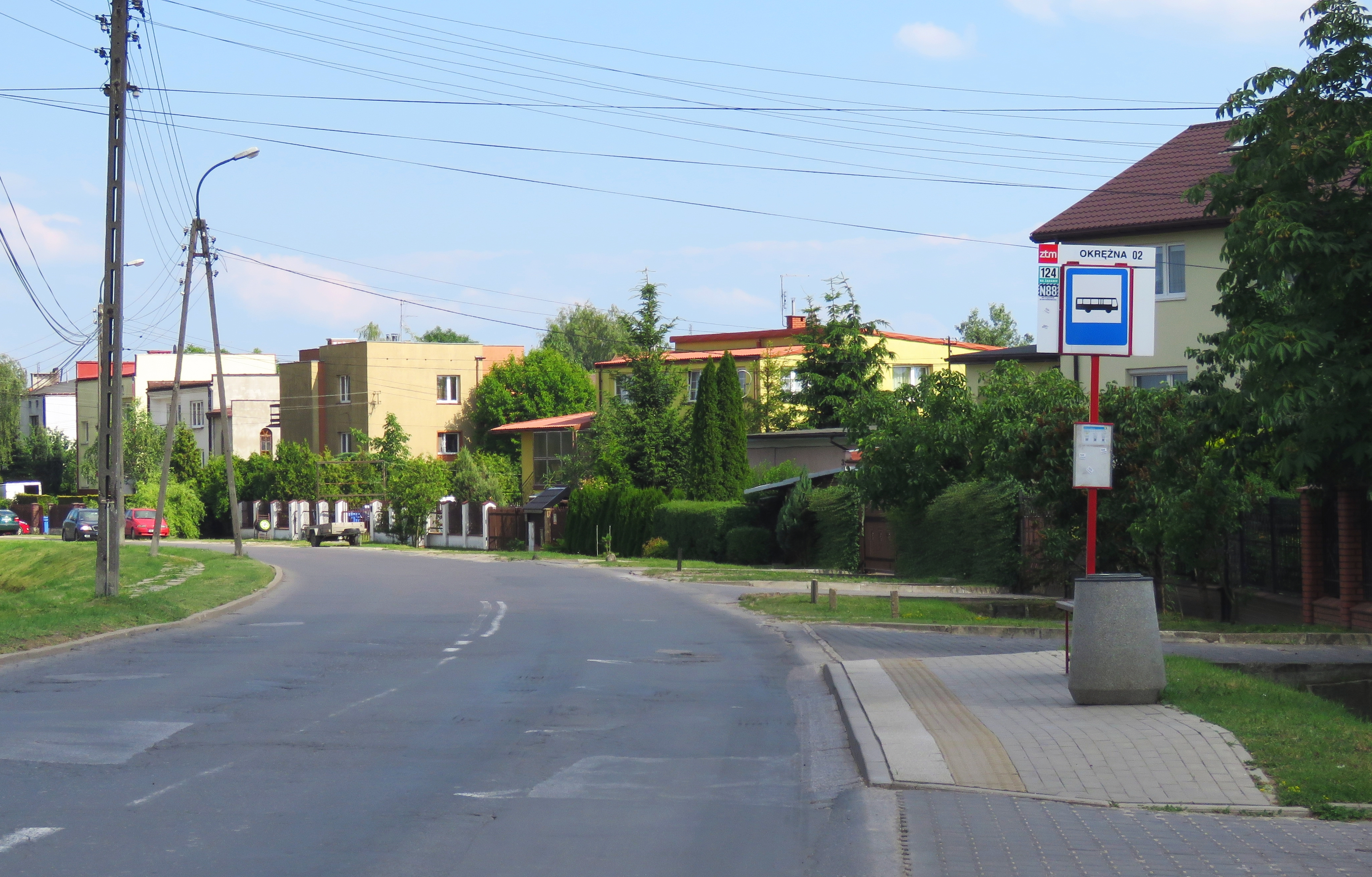

- Location within Poland
- Coordinates: 52°9′13″N 20°56′36″E
- Country: Poland
- Voivodeship: Masovian
- County: Pruszków
- Gmina: Raszyn
- Population: 4,100

Rybie [ˈrɨbjɛ] is a village in the administrative district of Gmina Raszyn, within Pruszków County, Masovian Voivodeship, in east-central Poland.
