= Sękocin Stary =

- Village
- Location within Poland
- Coordinates: 52°6′N 20°53′E
- Country: Poland
- Voivodeship: Masovian
- County: Pruszków
- Gmina: Raszyn
- Population (approx.): 1,000

Sękocin Stary [sɛŋˈkɔt͡ɕin ˈstarɨ] is a village in the administrative district of Gmina Raszyn, within Pruszków County, Masovian Voivodeship, in east-central Poland.
