= Museum of Caricature, Warsaw =

Coordinates: 52°14′42″N 21°0′47″E

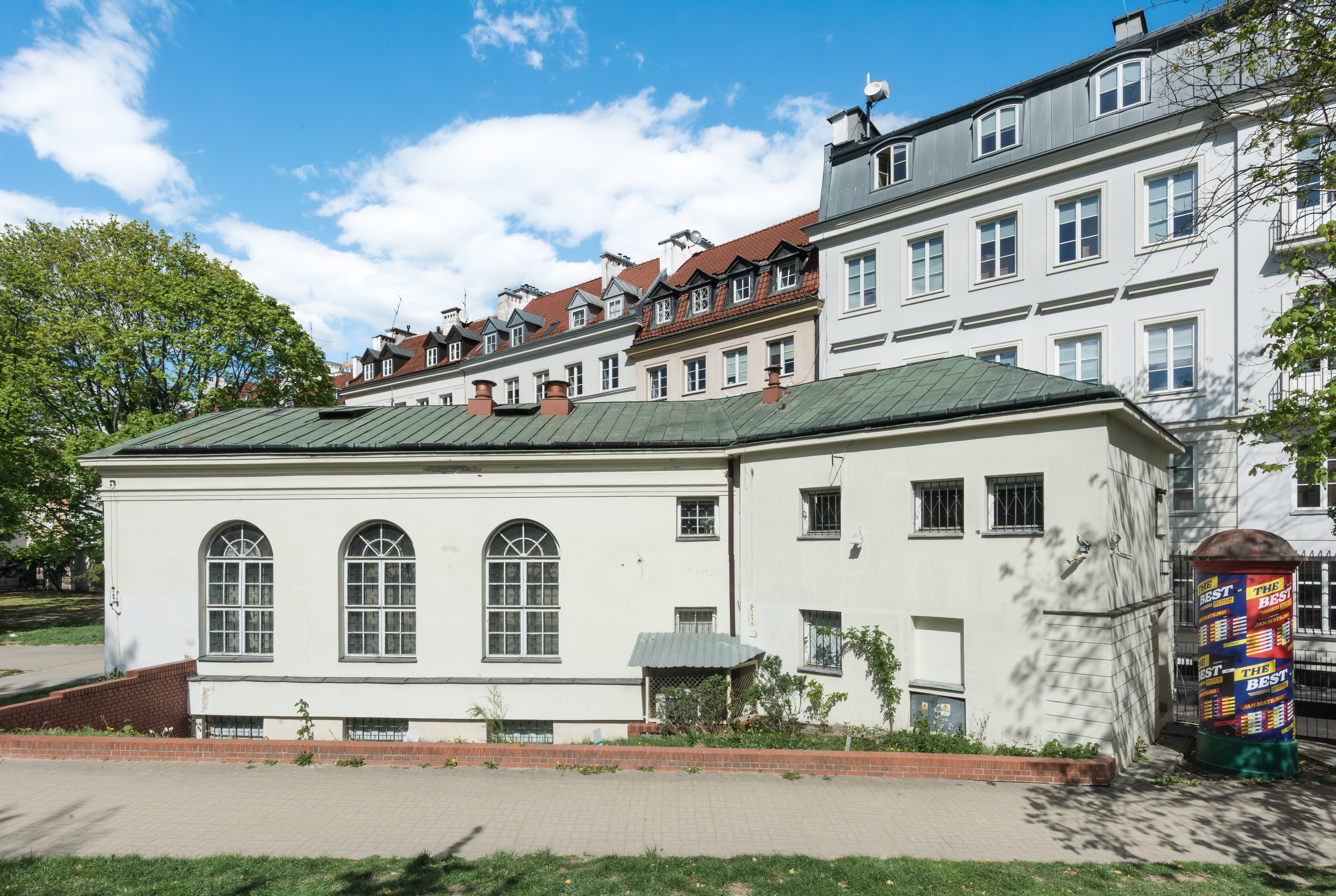
- Established: 1978
- Location: Kozia 11; Warsaw, Poland
- Type: art museum
- Website: muzeumkarykatury.pl

Museum of Caricature (Polish: Muzeum Karykatury) (also known as the Eryk Lipiński Museum of Caricature) is a museum in Warsaw, Poland. The museum was founded by Eryk Lipiński in 1978, and he was the director of the museum until his death in 1991. The museum has a collection of over 20,000 pieces by Polish and foreign artists.

The museum's premises are an old orangery which was once part of the 18th century Prymas Castle. As the museum only has limited space it does not have a permanent collection on display but instead shows temporary exhibitions based on its holdings. The museum's archives are an open resource to anybody who is interested in the history of caricature.

== Artists ==
Some of the artists in the museum's collection are:

- William Hogarth
- Honoré Daumier
- Jean Effel
- Herbert Sandberg
- Roland Topor
- Franciszek Kostrzewski
- Kazimierz Sichulski
- Jerzy Zaruba
- Maja Berezowska
- Eryk Lipiński
- Andrzej Krauze
- Zbigniew Lengren
- Andrzej Mleczko
- Sławomir Mrożek
