= Laszczki =

- Village
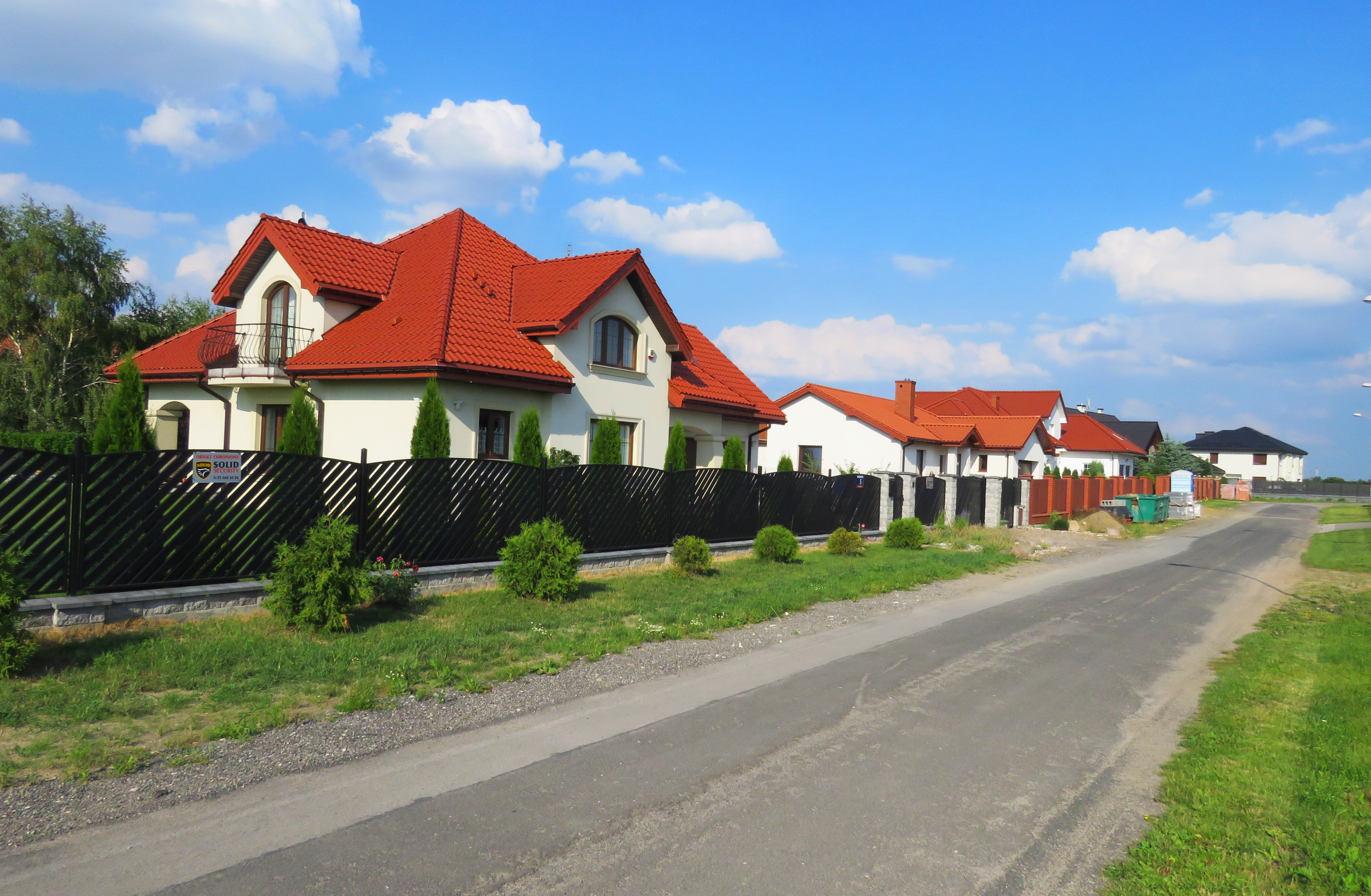

- Location within Poland
- Coordinates: 52°7′18″N 20°54′44″E
- Country: Poland
- Voivodeship: Masovian
- County: Pruszków
- Gmina: Raszyn
- Population: 537

Laszczki [ˈlaʂt͡ʂki] is a village in the administrative district of Gmina Raszyn, within Pruszków County, Masovian Voivodeship, in east-central Poland.
