= Łady, Pruszków County =

Łady
- Village
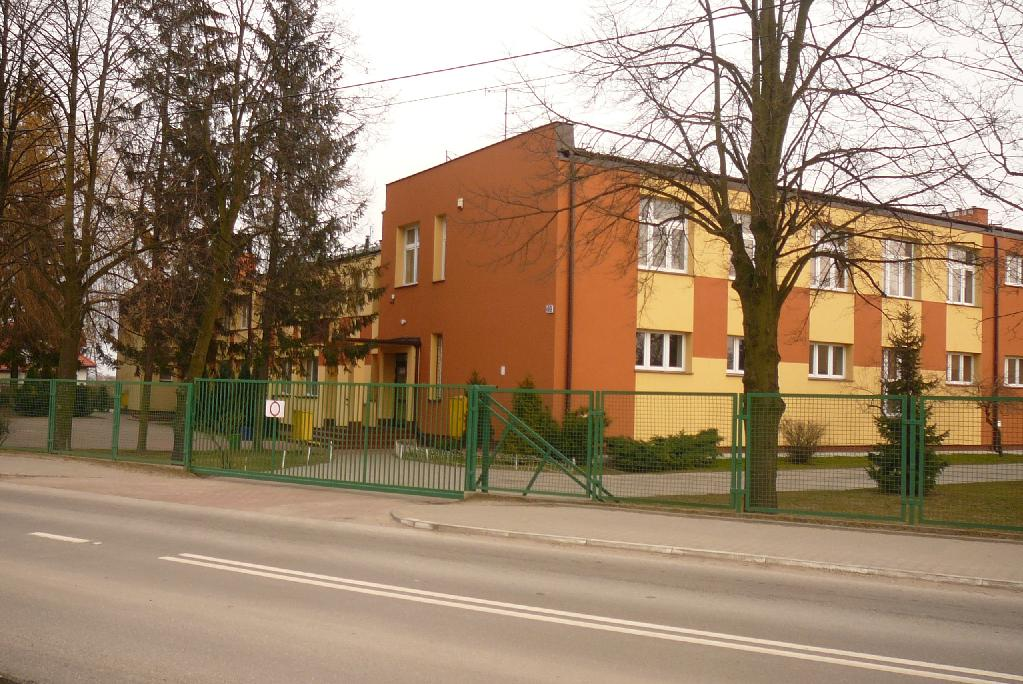
- Primary school in Łady

- Location within Poland
- Coordinates: 52°7′32″N 20°57′21″E
- Country: Poland
- Voivodeship: Masovian
- County: Pruszków
- Gmina: Raszyn
- Population: 330
- Time zone: UTC+1 (CET)
  - Summer (DST): UTC+2 (CEST)
- Vehicle registration: WPR

Łady [ˈwadɨ] is a village in the administrative district of Gmina Raszyn, within Pruszków County, Masovian Voivodeship, in east-central Poland.

In 1827, the village had a population of 60.
