= Dawidy Bankowe =

- Village
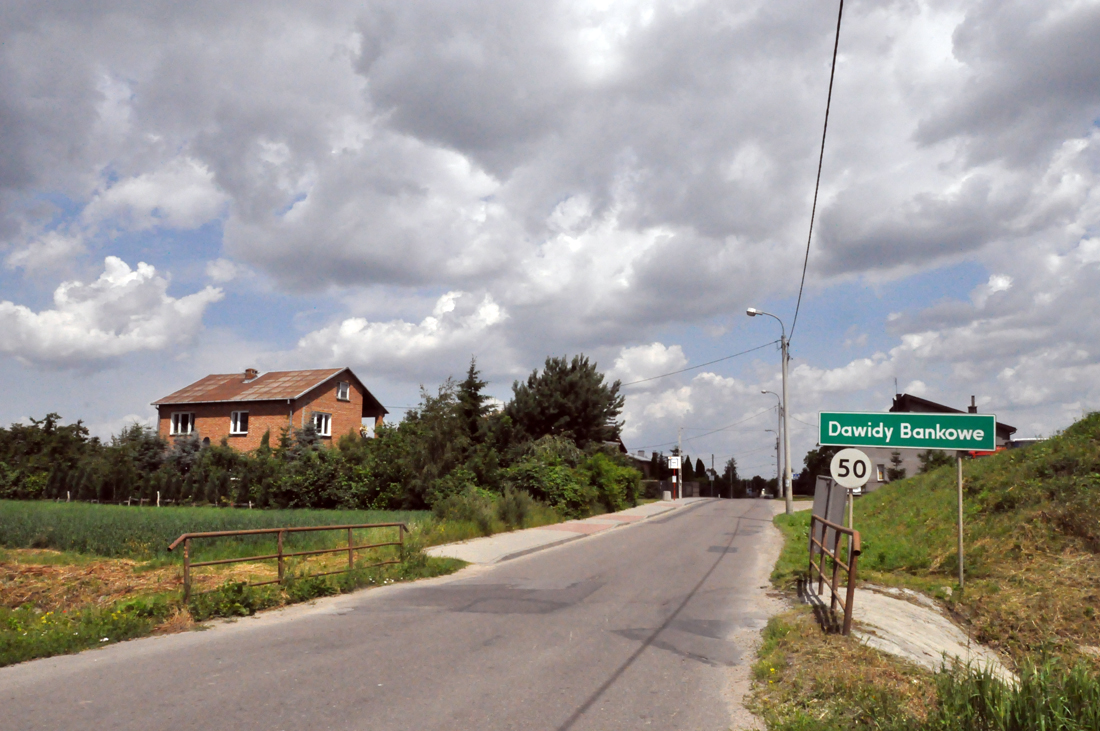
- Entrance to the village

- Location within Poland
- Coordinates: 52°7′18″N 20°58′46″E
- Country: Poland
- Voivodeship: Masovian
- County: Pruszków
- Gmina: Raszyn
- Population: 1,417
- Website: http://dawidy.bankowe.com.pl/

Dawidy Bankowe [daˈvidɨ banˈkɔvɛ] is a village in the administrative district of Gmina Raszyn, within Pruszków County, Masovian Voivodeship, in east-central Poland.
