= Falenty =

- Village
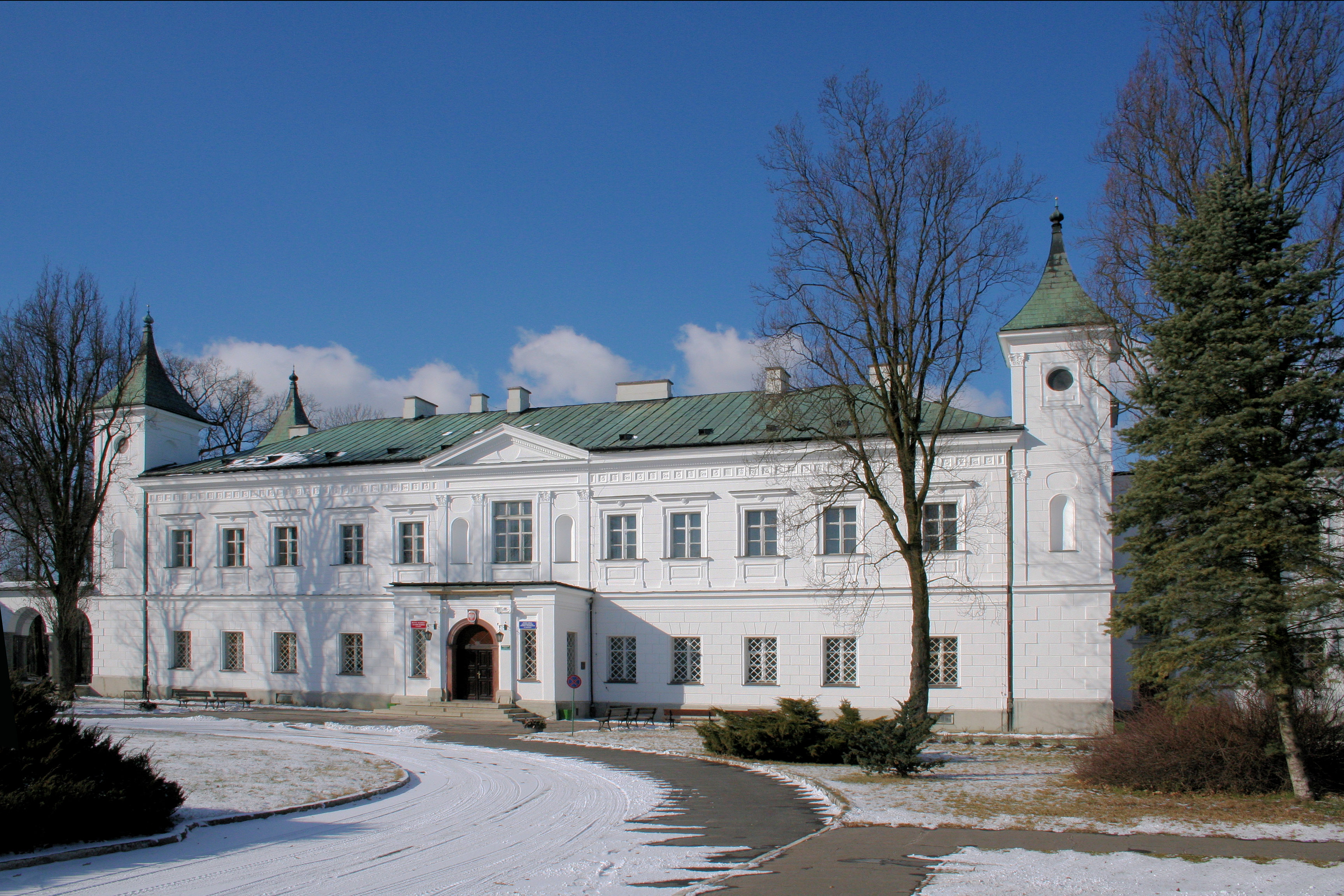
- Falenty Palace (early 17th century), currently a Technological Institute

- Location within Poland
- Coordinates: 52°8′14″N 20°55′29″E
- Country: Poland
- Voivodeship: Masovian
- County: Pruszków
- Gmina: Raszyn
- First mentioned: 1434

Population
  - Total: 690
- Time zone: UTC+1 (CET)
  - Summer (DST): UTC+2 (CEST)
- Vehicle registration: WPR

Falenty [faˈlɛntɨ] is a village in the administrative district of Gmina Raszyn, within Pruszków County, Masovian Voivodeship, in east-central Poland. It is part of the Warsaw metropolitan area.

== History ==
The oldest known written mention of Falenty comes from a document from 1434. In the medieval period, dukes of the local Masovian line of the Piast dynasty were known to hunt in Falenty. In the early modern period, a trade route connecting Warsaw and Kraków ran through the village. It was one of the busiest routes in Poland.

Falenty was a private village of Polish nobility, including the Wiśniewski, Wolski, Opacki, Załuski, Szaniawski, Przebendowski and Rzewuski families. Zygmunt Opacki, Chamberlain of Warsaw, built the local landmark palace. Most famous owners included Chancellor of Poland Andrzej Chryzostom Załuski, Bishop of Kuyavia and Kraków Konstanty Felicjan Szaniawski, Voivode of Pomerania Ignacy Przebendowski, Marshal of the Court of the Crown Franciszek Rzewuski and wealthy banker Piotr Fergusson Tepper.

King Sigismund III Vasa often stayed in Falenty with his family and court. In 1646, Queen consort of Poland Marie Louise Gonzaga stopped at the Falenty palace and met Prince Sigismund Casimir Vasa and Chancellor of Poland Jerzy Ossoliński there. In 1670, it was the place of meeting of King Michał Korybut Wiśniowiecki and his wife Queen Eleonore following her return from Częstochowa to Warsaw. In 1683, King John III Sobieski of Poland stopped in Falenty on his way to relieve the besieged city of Vienna. His son, Prince James Louis Sobieski, and King Stanisław August Poniatowski were frequent visitors of Falenty.

In the 19th century, the Falenty estate passed to the Ostrowski, Spiski and Przeździecki families. During the Battle of Raszyn (1809) it passed between Polish and Austrian control several times. At the turn of the 19th and 20th centuries it was a possession of Czetwertyński family.

== Sights ==
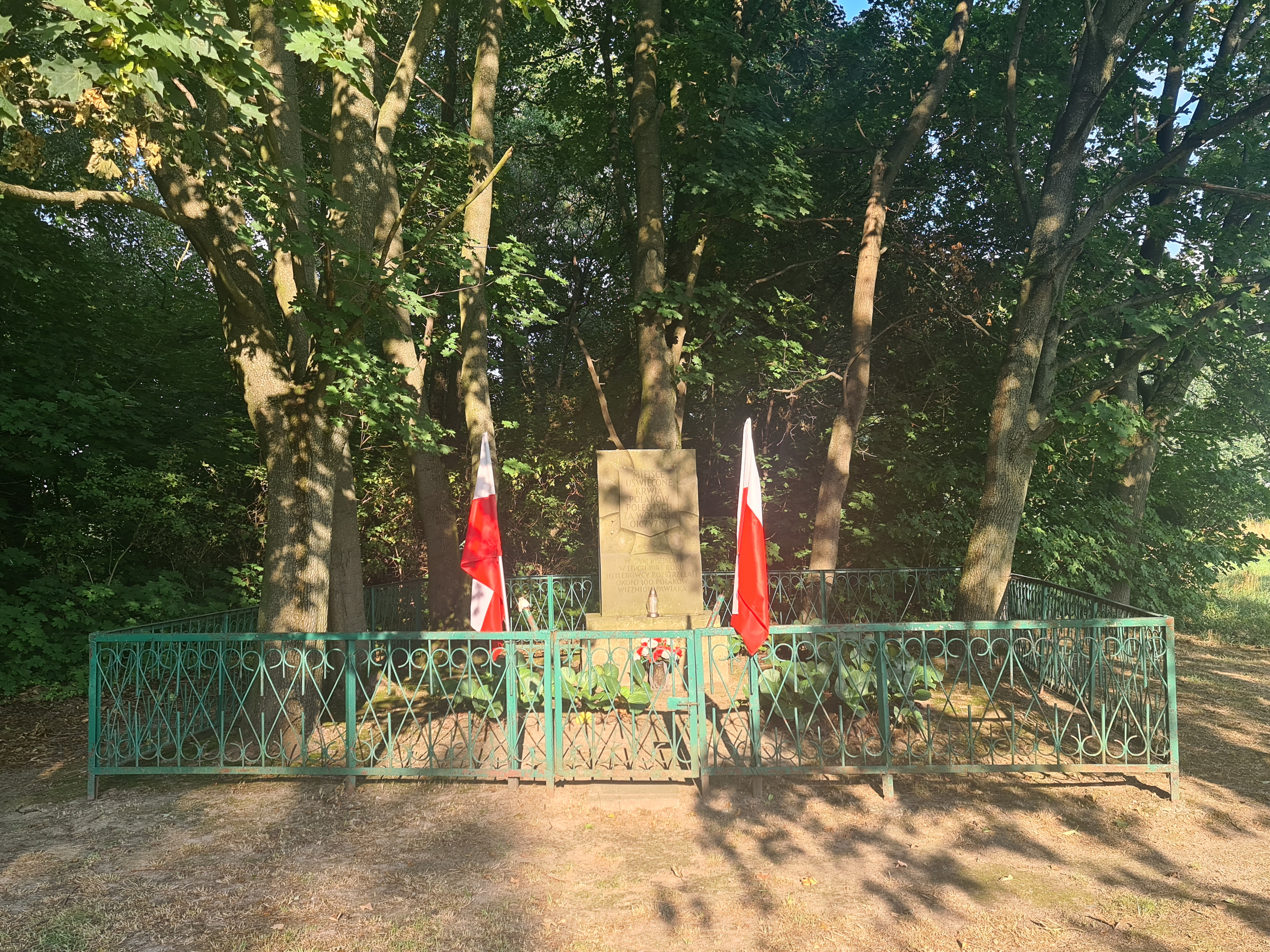
Monument at the site of a German Nazi massacre of 100 Poles from 1943

- Palace and park ensemble with an orangery, an outbuilding, and an entrance gate, currently a Technological Institute
- Monument at the site of a German Nazi massacre of some 100 Poles, prisoners of Pawiak, from 1943

== Notable people ==
- Magdalena Abakanowicz (1930–2017), Polish sculptor and fiber artist
