= Manhattanville University =

Private university in Purchase, New York, US

Coordinates: 41°1′55.42″N 73°42′56.01″W

- Former names: Academy of the Sacred Heart (1841–1917); College of the Sacred Heart (1917–1937); Manhattanville College of the Sacred Heart (1937–1966); Manhattanville College (1966–2024)
- Motto: In Exultatione Metens
- Type: Private university
- Established: 1841; 185 years ago
- Academic affiliations: CUMU
- Endowment: $18.1 million (2024)
- President: Frank Sánchez
- Provost: Christine Dehne
- Faculty: 85 (full-time)
- Students: 2,224
- Undergraduates: 1,284
- Postgraduates: 940
- Location: Purchase, New York, United States
- Campus: Suburban; 100 acres (0.40 km^{2})
- Colors: (Crimson, black, and white)
- Sporting affiliations: NCAA Division III, Skyline Conference
- Mascot: Valiant
- Website: mville.edu

Manhattanville University (previously Manhattanville College) is a private university in Purchase, New York, United States. It was founded in 1841 and offers more than 45 undergraduate programs (majors) across arts, sciences, business, education, nursing, and related fields and more than 70 graduate and certificate programs. In Athletics, the Manhattanville Valiants compete in the DIII Skyline Conference.

Manhattanville sits on a 100 acre campus designed by Fredrick Law Olmsted. The architectural and administrative centerpiece of the Manhattanville campus is Reid Hall (1864) which was named after Whitelaw Reid, publisher and owner of the New-York Tribune. Next to Reid Hall stand academic buildings on one side and on the other residence halls around a central quad designed by the landscape architect Frederick Law Olmsted. Other historic buildings include: the Lady Chapel designed by Maya Lin; the President's Cottage known as the Barbara Debs House; the old Stables; and Water Tower.

== History ==
=== The Academy of the Sacred Heart (1841–1917) ===
Manhattanville University traces its origins to an Academy of the Sacred Heart founded over 175 years ago on the Lower East Side of New York City. In August 1841 the Society of the Sacred Heart (RSCJ), a Catholic religious order dedicated to the education of young women, established an academy at 412 Houston Street, near the corner of Mulberry Street, in the tightly packed warren of narrow streets in the southeast corner of Manhattan Island facing the East River.

In September 1844 the boarding school moved to Ravenswood in the Astoria section of Queens. Archbishop John Hughes counted "upon Ravenswood becoming the leading Academy for young Ladies" in the Archdiocese of New York. However, within two years the location proved too remote.

In 1847, the growing academy relocated to the former estate of Jacob Lorillard in the village of Manhattanville on the Upper West Side of Manhattan in what was then a rural village. It occupied this site from 1847 to 1952 and it is from this location that the university derives its current name. At that time, the village of Manhattanville was still eight miles north of New York City, which clustered around the south end at the Battery of Manhattan Island. By the time of the American Civil War, (1861–1865), the Manhattanville Academy counted 280 girl pupils. The academy was always diverse with a substantial proportion of the student body consisting of recent immigrants from Latin America and Europe.

Over the next century New York City expanded, transforming the area from a farming village to a neighborhood in West Harlem. The Convent Avenue campus was located between 130th and 135th streets. The western border was Convent Avenue and its eastern border St. Nicholas Terrace. In 1949 proceedings began to incorporate the campus into the existing City College campus. Today it is known as the South Campus of City College. The final remaining buildings from the Manhattanville era are Park Hall (then known as Benziger) and Mott Hall (the Parish School during Manhattanville's time).

=== The College of the Sacred Heart (1917–1937) ===
In the early 20th century, higher education opportunities for women increased as many academies, seminaries, institutions and lower schools transitioned to the status of colleges. Shortly before the United States declared war on the German Empire and entered the First World War, on March 1, 1917, the Academy of the Sacred Heart in Manhattanville received a Provisional Charter from the Regents of the State of New York to offer undergraduate degrees as "The College of the Sacred Heart". The first baccalaureate degrees were granted in 1918. The Absolute Charter was signed May 29, 1919. As the college grew, the city of New York also expanded northward, toward the far north end of Manhattan Island, toward the Harlem River, transforming the surrounding area from a rural village to diverse residential/commercial communities of Manhattan bordered by the Harlem and Morningside Heights neighborhoods. In 1935, The College of the Sacred Heart was accredited by the Association of American Universities. The name was officially changed to "Manhattanville College of the Sacred Heart" in 1937.

=== Manhattanville College of the Sacred Heart (1937–1966) ===
==== Racial justice (Manhattanville Resolutions) ====
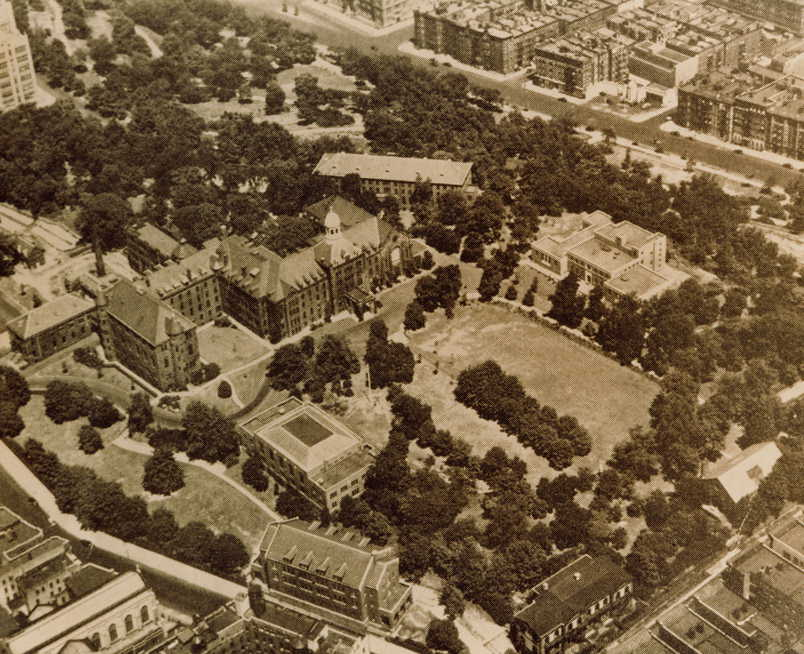
An aerial photo of the former campus of the Manhattanville College of the Sacred Heart in the Manhattanville section of northwestern Manhattan in New York City, taken from the south looking northeast

In the 1930s, the Manhattanville student body consisted of approximately 200 female students. Though small, the college made headlines across the country for taking a strong position promoting racial equality decades before the Civil Rights Movement of the late 1950s, into the 1960s and 1970s. In May 1933, students created the "Manhattanville Resolutions" a document that pledged an active student commitment to racial justice.

Alumni response to a racially integrated but all-female student body was mixed and somewhat controversial for a time. College president Grace Dammann addressed negative responses at the annual Class Day reunion on May 31, 1938:

The more we know of man's doing and thinking throughout time and throughout the world's extent, the more we understand that beauty and goodness and truth are not the monopoly of any age nor of any group nor of any race.

The speech went on to be published in several national publications. When Dammann died suddenly in 1945, The New York Times obituary summarized her life's work with the headline, "Mother Dammann, College President: Head of Manhattanville Since 1930 Dies--Champion of Racial Equality."

Manhattanville would continue its work in social action first through the National Federation of Catholic College Students and to this day with the Duchesne Center for Religion and Social Justice and the Connie Hogarth Center for Social Action. Mary Louise (Mamie) Jenkins, RSCJ was the first African American student to graduate from Manhattanville and June Mulvaney was the first African American student to major in Russian at Manhattanville.

==== Growth ====
In February 1949, The New York Times reported that neighboring City College of New York was campaigning to acquire the Manhattanville campus to expand its facilities. The same month, CCNY distributed a pamphlet, entitled "No Other Place to Go: A City College Plea for Purchase of the Manhattanville Property". The New York City Board of Estimate agreed and deeded the campus to City College via the legal process of condemnation and eminent domain. In September 1949, the Manhattanville Board of Trustees purchased the Whitelaw Reid Estate, north of the city in suburban Westchester County. The next two years saw condemnation proceedings work through the New York State Supreme Court system. Manhattanville was eventually given near $8.8 million ($8,808,620) for the Manhattan campus and buildings. A groundbreaking ceremony was held at the new campus near Harrison, in Purchase, New York on May 3, 1951. The new campus with its buildings were renovated and other construction was completed in October 1952.

=== Manhattanville College (1966–2024) ===
In 1965, the college introduced its first graduate program, a Masters of Arts in Teaching and in 1993, the first graduate programs in business were offered. The first doctoral program was introduced in 2010 with the Ed.D. in Educational Leadership from the School of Education.

=== Manhattanville University (2024–present) ===
On April 3, 2024, Manhattanville College became Manhattanville University. The change was made possible, in part, because of an update in 2022 to the state Board of Regents' definition of a university. A few weeks later, Manhattanville leaders announced that the university would maintain Wells College's transcripts, business records, and other important artifacts after its closure.

=== Presidents ===
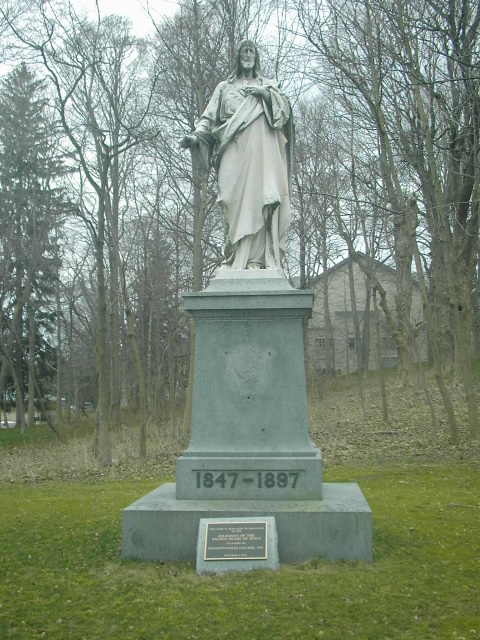
Manhattanville Graveyard.

Since its chartering as a college in 1917, Manhattanville has had 16 presidents, including acting presidents, one of whom also served as interim president for a period of time:

1. Mary Moran (1917–1918)
2. Ruth Burnett (1918–1924)
3. Charlotte Lewis (1924–1930)
4. Grace Dammann (1930–1945)
5. Eleanor O'Byrne (1945–1965)
6. Elizabeth McCormack (1966–1974)
7. Harold Delaney (1974–1975)
8. Barbara Knowles Debs (1975–1985)
9. Jane C. Maggin (acting) (1981–1982)
10. Marcia Savage (1985–1995)
11. Richard Berman (1995–2009)
12. Molly Easo Smith (2009–2011); Robert Hall (acting) (2011)
13. Jon Strauss (2011–2016)
14. Michael E. Geisler (2016–2022); Louise Feroe (acting; interim) (summer 2021; 2022–2023)
15. Frank Sanchez (2023–Present)

== Current campus ==
=== Reid Estate (1860–1949) ===
Manhattanville purchased its current 100-acre campus in 1949. The first European owner of the parcel of land was Ben Holladay who bought the estate in the 1860s and named its Ophir Farm after a silver mine in Nevada. The Holladay family built a mansion called Ophir Hall, family chapel, and several outbuildings. However, after several family deaths and financial difficulties, Ben Holladay left the estate in 1873.

In 1888 Whitelaw Reid and his wife Elisabeth Mills Reid purchased the property. Whitelaw was editor of The New York Tribune and served various political positions including ambassador to France and England. Elisabeth was the daughter of Darius Ogden Mills, founder of The Bank of California. The Reids remodeled the existing Ophir Hall and outfitted it with the latest home luxuries, including electricity. However, shortly before completion, faulty wiring sparked a fire that destroyed the home on July 14, 1888. The Reids rebuilt under the direction of the famed architectural firm of McKim, Mead & White. This home was designed in the style of a gothic castle and built onto the existing foundation. The Castle was completed in 1892. A three-story addition including the East Library and West Room was completed in 1912. Whitelaw Reid died while serving as the ambassador to England in 1912. Elizabeth Mills Reid died in 1931 and the contents of the house were auctioned in 1935. In 1947 the Reid family placed the estate for sale.

Reid Castle was dedicated to Elisabeth Mills Reid on September 19, 1969. In 1974, the U.S. Department of the Interior placed the building on the National Register of Historic Places in recognition of its historical and architectural significance.

=== Purchase Campus (1952–present) ===
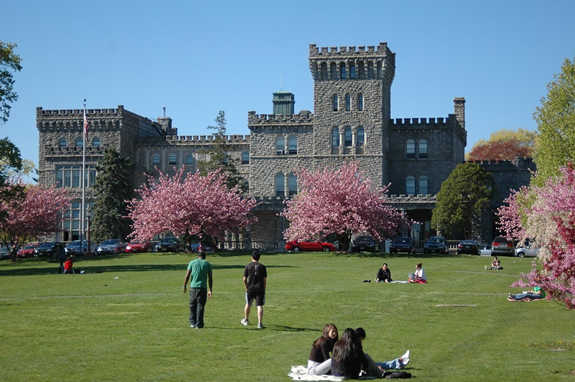
The architectural and administrative centerpiece of the Manhattanville College campus, Reid Hall (1864), is named after Whitelaw Reid, owner/publisher of the New York Tribune

After moving from Manhattan, the new Manhattanville campus relocated to suburban Purchase, New York in Westchester County. The new campus was completed in 1952. The six original buildings on the new campus were Reid Hall; the library; Benziger Dining Hall; Brownson Hall, the main classroom building; Pius X Hall, the music building; and Founder's Hall, a dormitory. All six of these buildings are still in use today.

The increasing student population led to the addition of a second dormitory (Spellman Hall) in 1957. The Kennedy Gymnasium, also completed in 1957, was made possible through a grant from the Lieutenant Joseph Kennedy Jr. Foundation. The Kennedy family dedicated the gymnasium in honor of their daughter, Kathleen, Marchioness of Hartington. The dedication for both the Kennedy Gymnasium and Spellman Hall were held October 27, 1957, and was presided over by Francis Cardinal Spellman, Archbishop of New York. In attendance were Joseph P. Kennedy, Rose Fitzgerald Kennedy ‘11, Jean Kennedy Smith ‘49, and Ethel Skakel Kennedy ‘49. Edward M. Kennedy delivered the dedication speech.

For the first decade in Purchase, the campus worship space was located in the West Room of Reid Castle. The new chapel was completed in 1963. It was named in honor of the longest serving president of the college, Eleanor O’Byrne, RSCJ.

The two newest dormitories on campus, Dammann Hall and Tenney Hall, were completed in 1966.

In 1991, forty-eight faculty and staff housing units added a new dimension to the Manhattanville campus community.

On September 26, 2006, the Manhattanville community dedicated the Ohnell Environmental Center. The center includes a classroom housed within a LEED-compliant, non-invasive structure designed by Maya Lin, architect of the Vietnam War Memorial. The project also included a restoration of the Holladay Stone Chapel, which features new stonework and a glass roof providing a unique reflective space on campus.

In 2008, the Berman Center was completed. This building currently houses the Communication and Media Department, the Berger Art Gallery, the student-run radio station MVL; the school newspaper, Touchstone; a dance studio and a fitness center. The past several years have seen a variety of campus renovations including improvements to the library, dining facilities, gym, athletic fields, tennis courts and campus walkways.

In 2012, the institution opened Heritage Hall, a permanent exhibition of Manhattanville's history. This walkway is located between Reid Hall and Benziger Hall.

== Academics ==
Manhattanville offers the Bachelor of Arts, Bachelor of Science, and Bachelor of Fine Arts degrees to undergraduate students and the Master of Arts in Teaching, Master of Education, Master of Professional Studies, Master of Science, and Doctor of Education degrees to graduate students. Undergraduates can choose from 45 majors and minors, while graduate students can explore 75 graduate degrees and advanced certificates. Students are also free to design special majors or engage in dual majors.

Academic rankings

Master's
- Washington Monthly: 305

Regional
- U.S. News & World Report: 58

National
- Forbes: 512
- WSJ/College Pulse: 601-800

=== Graduate programs ===
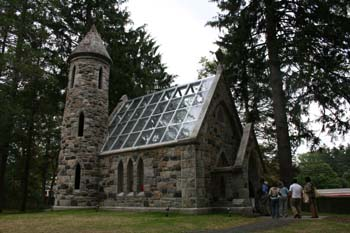
The restored nineteenth-century "Lady Chapel" in Ohnell Environmental Park

In addition to its 45 majors and minors of undergraduate study, Manhattanville University offers 75 graduate master's degrees and certificates and an Ed.D. in the School of Education. The university also offers Master's of Science degrees, a Master of Fine Arts, and a range of dual degree programs. The Institute for Managing Risk and the Women's Leadership Institute provide academic resources skills and events to serve the needs of individuals, organizations and businesses.

=== School of Nursing and Health Sciences ===
In 2019 the school began exploring the possibility of opening a nursing school as the nearby College of New Rochelle had permanently closed. In fall 2020 in the midst of the COVID-19 pandemic, Manhattanville opened its nursing school. During its first year, in 2020, Manhattanville's School of Nursing and Health Sciences admitted more than 120 nursing students. In January 2021, the institution added a Family Nurse Practitioner (FNP) program that welcomed its first students in the fall 2021. The school offers two degrees in nursing: Bachelor of Science in Nursing (BSN) for traditional 4-year and transfer students as well as a Bachelor of Science in Nursing for second-degree students who hold a bachelor's degree.

In 2021, Manhattanville announced that it reached an agreement with Concordia College to acquire the school's Radiologic Technology (Rad Tech) program and the Rad Tech students from Concordia transferred to Manhattanville to complete their degrees. The Bachelor of Science (BS) in Radiologic Technology is a 122-credit program accredited by the Joint Review Committee on Education in Radiologic Technology (JRCERT) and registered with the New York State Department of Education (NYSED).

In November 2021, the School of Nursing and Health Sciences received accreditation from the Commission on Collegiate Nursing Education (CCNE) for its Bachelor of Science programs in Nursing. In addition, as of November 2021, the school has a 100 percent pass rate for the National Council Licensure Examination (NCLEX), meaning all recent graduates from the Bachelor of Science in Nursing program at Manhattanville who have taken the test have passed the national licensure exam.

=== Manhattanville Library Rare Book and Manuscripts Room ===
The Rare Book and Manuscripts Room preserves both manuscripts and printed materials from the Manhattanville University Library. The rare book collection consists of approximately 2,400 titles that span the history of the book in the United States and Europe. Subject fields represented include history, religion, literature, biography, and philosophy. The collection also includes other formats such as periodicals, Jewish pamphlets, government documents, maps, and manuscripts. Particularly noteworthy are five incunabula, and several bound manuscript volumes. The latter include individual collections of psalms and prayers intended as an aid to private devotion, known as the Books of Hours. The most notable of these is the Horae Beatae Mariae Virginis, Cum Calendario—also known as the Manhattanville Book of Hours.

=== Pius X School of Liturgical Music ===
The Pius X School of Liturgical Music was opened in 1916 and closed in 1960. It was founded by Justine Ward, who had developed teaching methods for Gregorian chant emulating the techniques of the monks in Solesmes, and by Georgia Lydia Stevens, a musician and nun. Faculty over the years included Ward, Achille Bragers and André Mocquereau. Thousands of music teachers studied at the school, including Cecilia Clare Bocard and Thomas Mark Liotta. The school's namesake was Pope Pius X, a devotee of sacred music who initiated reform of the liturgy in the 20th century. In 1959, Richard Rodgers attended a concert on the college's campus as part of research for The Sound of Music. In 2010 a Gregorian Chant, held in Pius X Hall, as part of Inauguration festivities for a previous President, saw a packed auditorium of alumni, students, and faculty, continuing on the tradition of the Pius X School of Liturgical Music.

== Student life ==
=== Housing ===
Manhattanville has four three-story residence halls, all located on the east side of the Quad. From North to South, they are Founder's Hall, Spellman Hall, Dammann Hall, and Tenney Hall.

- Founder's Hall offers single and double rooms with bathrooms shared between two neighboring rooms. Founder's is also home of the School of Nursing and Health Sciences.
- Spellman Hall offers single, premium single, and double rooms with community bathrooms on each floor. Spellman is mainly reserved for first-year students, unlike the other three halls which house mainly upper-class students. Spellman is also home of Campus Safety and the Student Affairs offices.
- Dammann and Tenney Halls offer suite-style rooms for either four or six students, with a shared living room and bathroom. Six-person suites contain two doubles and two singles, while four-person suites contain two regular singles and two premium singles.

=== Athletics ===
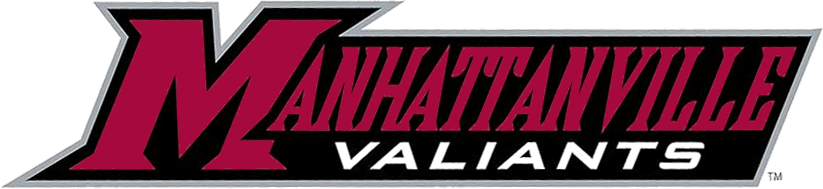
Manhattanville athletics wordmark

Manhattanville is a member of NCAA Division III, competing primarily in the Skyline Conference, the United Collegiate Hockey Conference (men's & women's hockey), and the NECC (Woman's Field Hockey). The department has added ten teams since 2007 and currently sponsors 22 varsity sports: men's and women's basketball, cross country, hockey, indoor track, lacrosse, outdoor track, and soccer; baseball, softball, men's and women's golf, field hockey, women's volleyball and men's and women's tennis.

Manhattanville was a charter member of the Skyline Conference, but would eventually leave to join the MAC Freedom Conference in 2007. In May 2018, Manhattanville announced that they would leave the MAC and return to the Skyline Conference for the 2019–20 academic year.

During the 2002–03 women's basketball season, senior basketball player Toni Smith received national attention after turning away from the American flag during the playing of the U.S. national anthem before games. Smith said the protest reflected her opposition to the impending Iraq War and concerns about social and economic inequality in the United States. The demonstration drew widespread media coverage and public debate, including protests at Manhattanville games. College president Richard Berman defended Smith's right to engage in peaceful expression, citing the institution's commitment to freedom of speech.

Former assistant baseball coach Eric Holtz 2004-2007 was the manager of the Israel national baseball team and was the assistant coach of gold-medal-winning Team USA in baseball at the 2013 Maccabiah Games, and the Team USA head coach for the gold-medal-winning Under-18 baseball team at the 2017 Maccabiah Games. He was the head coach of the first baseball team to represent Israel at the Olympics.

=== Publications ===
The national literary magazine Graffiti is published at Manhattanville. In addition, MFA program publishes the literary journal, Inkwell.

== Notable alumni ==
Manhattanville notable alumni

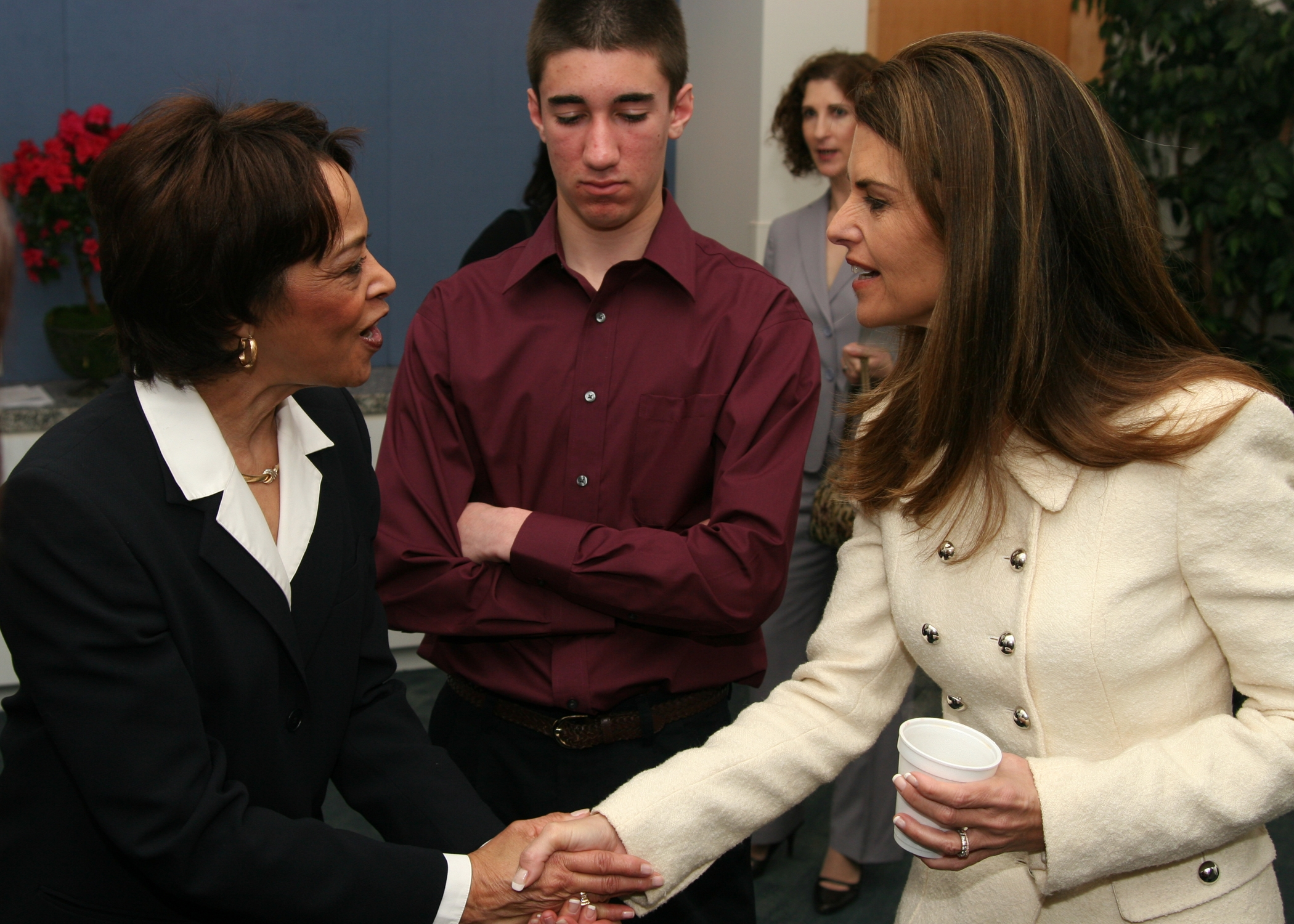
Maria Shriver (at right) in 2008

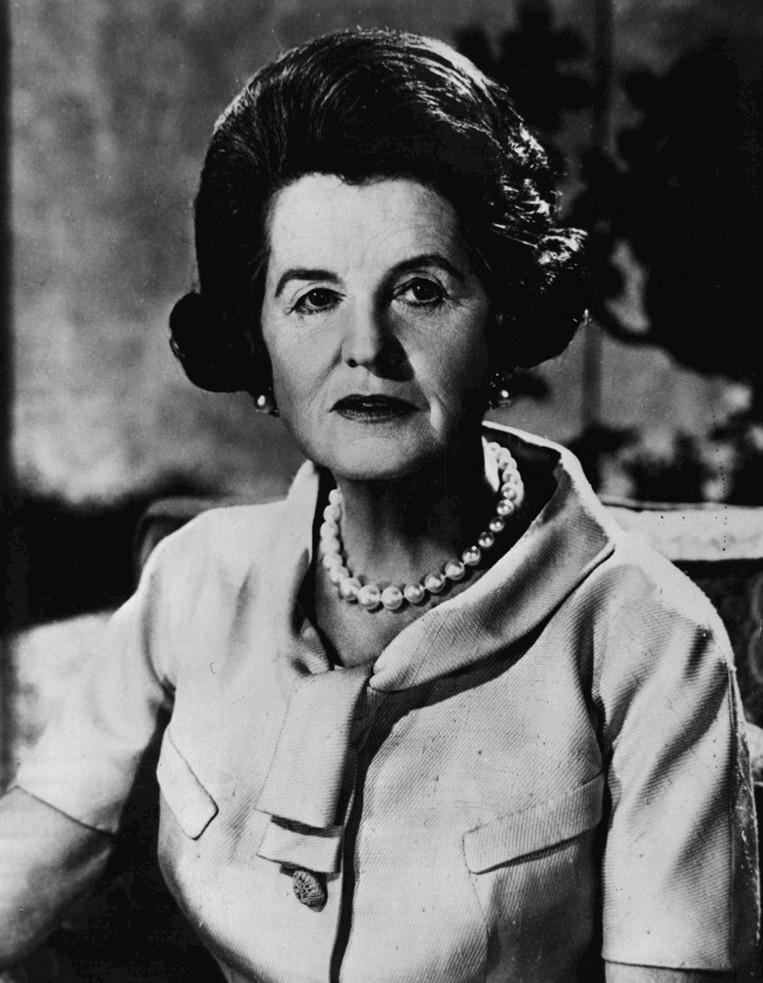
Rose Kennedy 1967

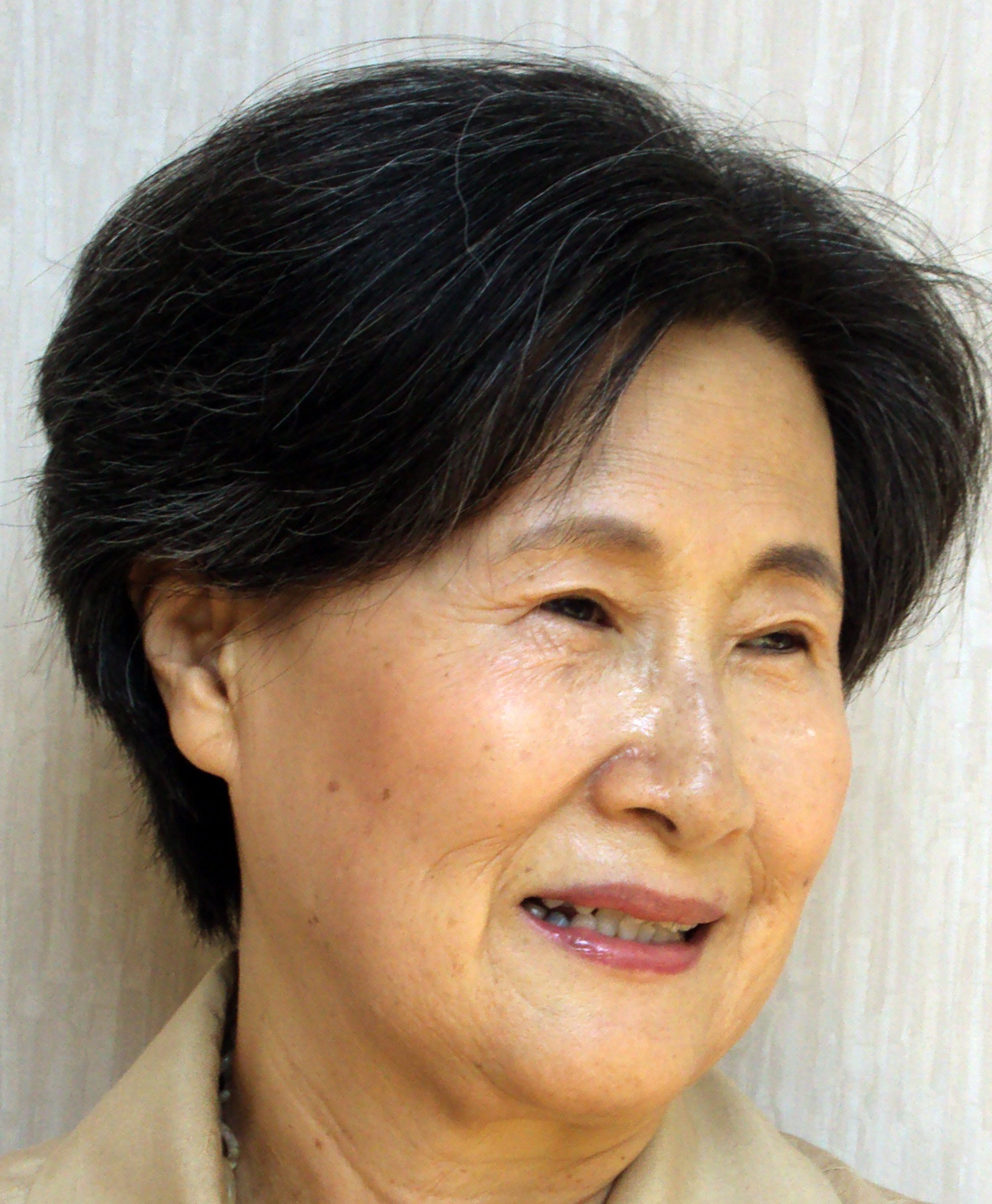
Sook Nyul Choi, children's author 1962

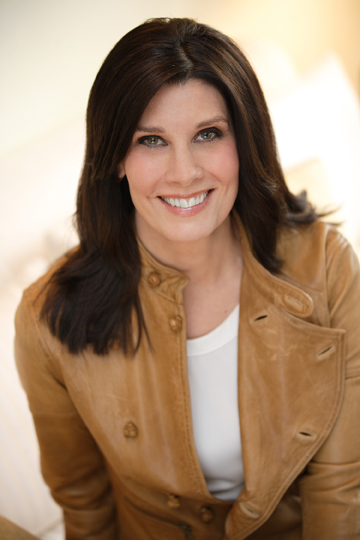
Kitty Pilgrim, CNN anchor 1976
