= Stary Grabów =

Neighbourhood of Warsaw, Poland

Grabów
- Neighbourhood
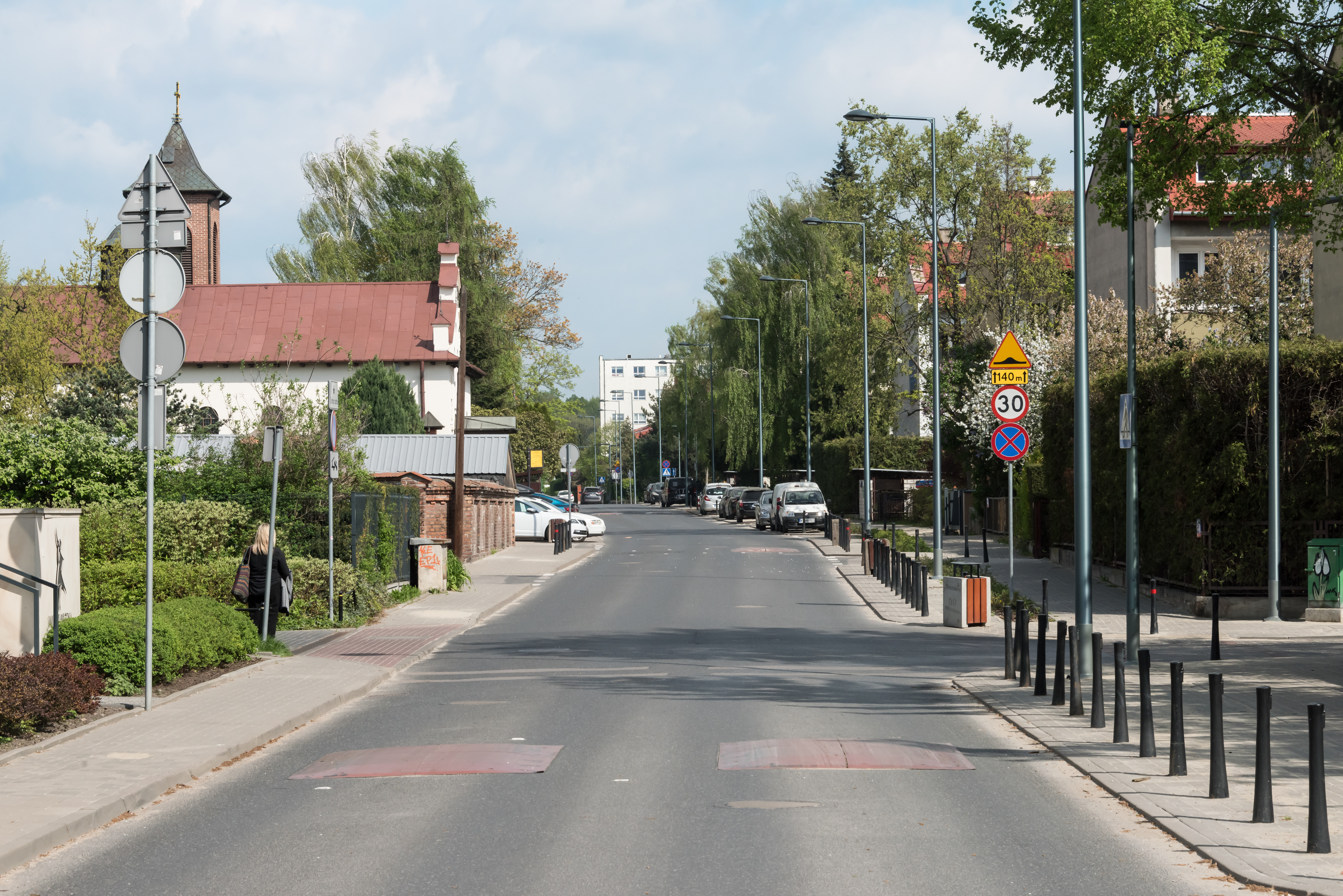
- Taneczna Street in Stary Grabów.
- Interactive map of Grabów
- Coordinates: 52.144490°N 21.011749°E
- Country: Poland
- Voivodeship: Masovian
- City and county: Warsaw
- District: Ursynów
- City Information System area: Grabów
- Time zone: UTC+1 (CET)
  - Summer (DST): UTC+2 (CEST)
- Area code: +48 22

Stary Grabów (Polish: [ˈsta.rɘ̟ ˈɡra.buf]; lit. 'Old Grabów') is a neighbourhood in the Ursynów district of Warsaw, Poland, located in the eastern portion of the and a City Information System area of Grabów. It is a residential area, predominantly with low-rise housing.

The oldest known records of Grabów, then a small village, date to the 18th century. The area was incorporated into the city in 1951.

== History ==
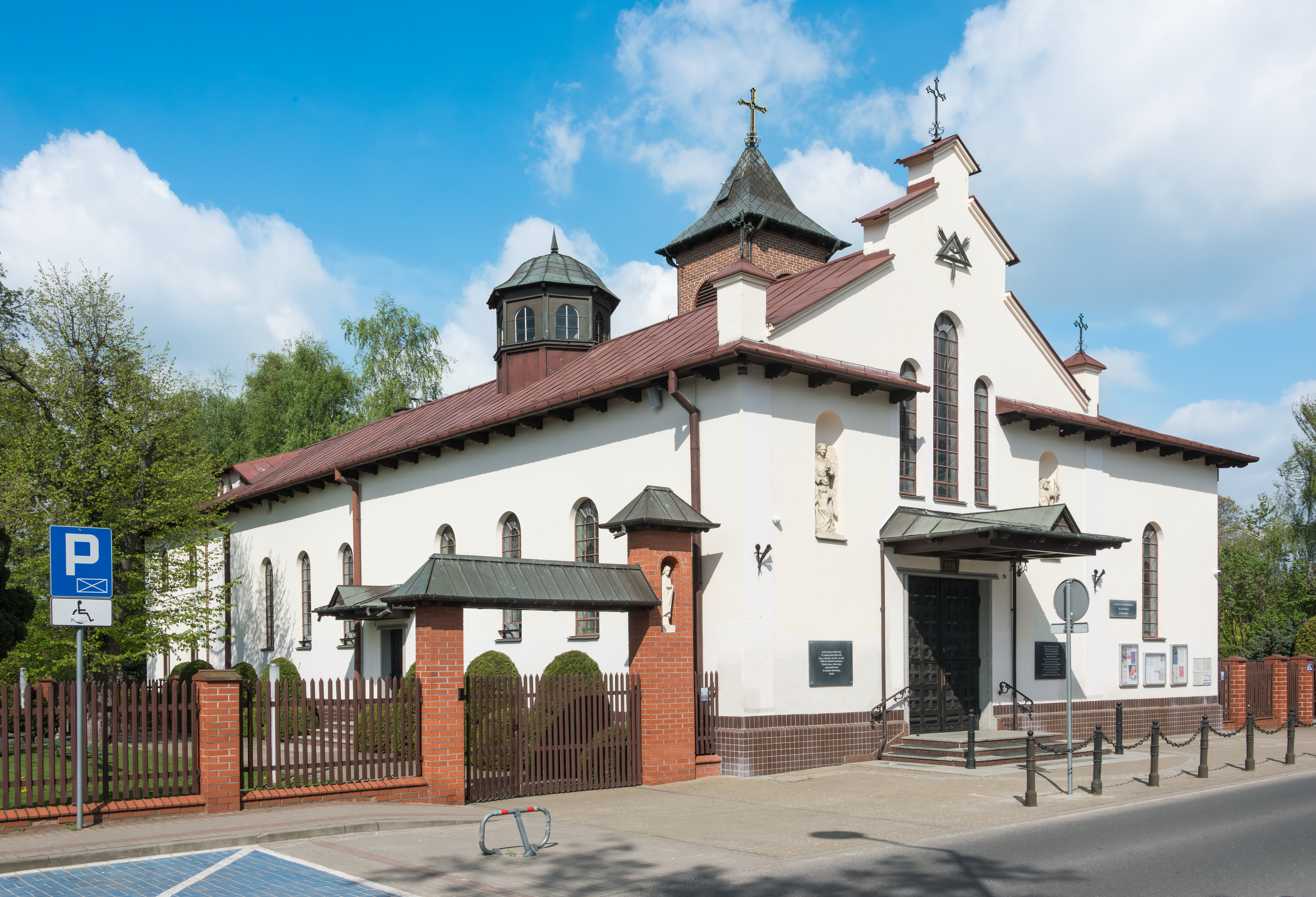
The St. Sophie Barat Church, built in 1995.

The oldest known records of Grabów, then a small village known as Grabowo, date to the 18th century. It was founded by Warsaw deputy cup-bearer Grabowski, on the farmlands of Imielin and Wyczółki. In 1827, it had 67 inhabitants in 9 households, in 1905, it had 157 inhabitants, and in 1921, it had 111 inhabitants in 21 households.

In 1898, the Grabów Emilin narrow-gauge railway station was established between Grabów and Imielin, at the current intersection of Puławska and Mysikrólika Streets. It was operated by the Grójec Commuter Railway, as part of the line between stations of Warszawa Mokotów and Nowe Miasto nad Pilicą, and was closed down in 1957.

In 1938, the nuns of the Society of the Sacred Heart settled to the north of Grabów, establishing a chappel. In 1952, it became a parish church, and between 1990 and 1995, in its place was built the St. Sophie Barat Church.

On 8 September 1939, Grabów was captured by the German forces during the siege of Warsaw in the Second World War. On 14 May 1951, it was incorporated into the city.

In the 1980s and 1990s, the housing estate of Grabów, composed of terraced houses, was built between Puławska Street, Mączyńskiego Street, Taneczna Street, and Grabów Canal, to the east of the neighbourhood.

== Characteristics ==
Grabów is a low-rise residential area, mostly composed of single-family houses. The neighbourhood includes the St. Sophie Barat Church, cojoined with the monastery of the Society of the Sacred Heart, placed at 65 Taneczna Street. Additionally, the Zabłocki Lake, which measures 0.92 ha, is placed to the east of the neighbourhood, near Krasnowolska and Poloneza Streets.
