= Georgia Lydia Stevens =

American Catholic nun and musician

Mother Georgia Stevens R.S.C.J.
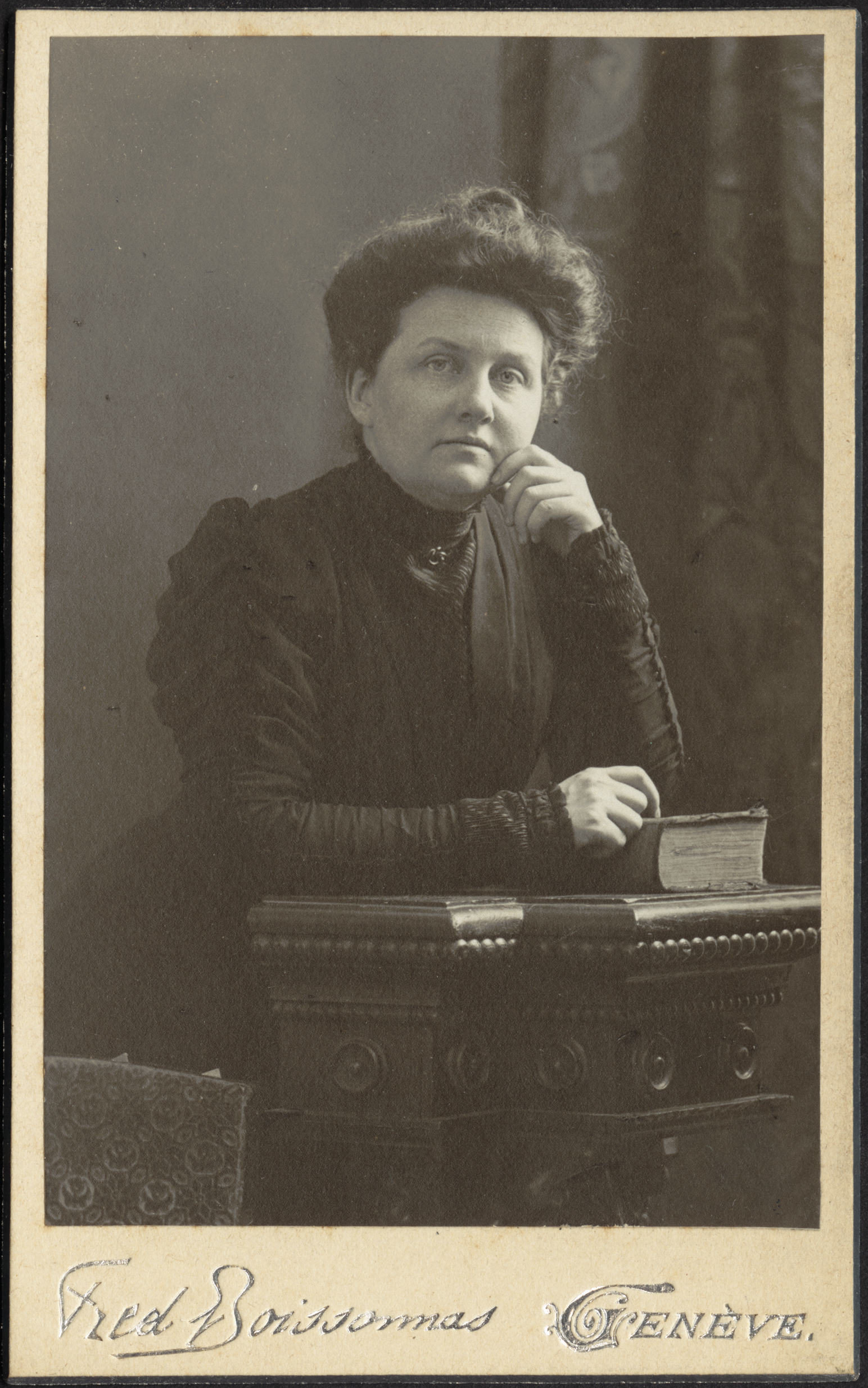
- Georgia Stevens c. 1900

Personal life
- Born: May 8, 1870 Boston, Massachusetts
- Died: March 28, 1946 (aged 75) Purchase, New York
- Education: Manhattanville Convent of the Sacred Heart, now named Manhattanville University
- Known for: Co-founder of Pius X School of Liturgical Music
- Occupation: Musician; Composer; Teacher

Religious life
- Religion: Roman Catholic
- Order: Society of the Sacred Heart
- Institute: Manhattanville College of the Sacred Heart

Georgia Lydia Stevens (May 8, 1870–March 28, 1946) of the Society of the Sacred Heart was an American cloistered nun and musician. She co-founded the Pius X School of Liturgical Music at the Manhattanville College of the Sacred Heart in New York City. Stevens wrote a variety of teaching materials and taught Gregorian chant. She served as the director of the Pius X School of Liturgical Music for 30 years until she died suddenly at the college at 75 years old in 1946.

== Early life ==
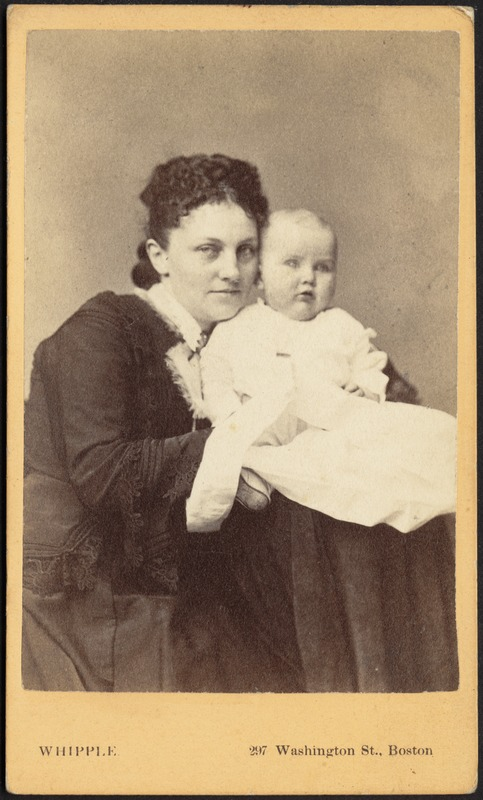
Georgia Stevens and her mother Helen Stevens c. 1871

Georgia Stevens was born on May 8, 1870 to parents Henry James and Helen Stevens née Granger in Boston, Massachusetts. Sources state that she was either the eldest daughter or the 3rd oldest of 5 children, all girls. Stevens received her education through a variety of means. When she was 12 years old she was sent to the Elmhurst Academy of the Sacred Heart, a private boarding school in Portsmouth, Rhode Island. She attended the academy for 2 years before returning home because "she was not happy conforming to the strict regimen." After returning home Stevens attended Mrs. Gilliat's School in Newport, RI.

A majority of Stevens' education was violin and composition related. Beginning at seven years old, she was taught violin by a teacher from Boston and at eighteen was sent to Frankfurt, Germany, to study violin at the Hoch Conservatory. While studying music and composition, Stevens studied under the concert violinist Hugo Heermann, the composer-theorist Percy Goetschius, and the composer Charles Martin Loeffler.

== Conversion to Catholicism ==
Stevens converted to Roman Catholicism after a visit to the Academy of the Sacred Heart in Spring 1894. She claimed to have received a vision following one of her performances at the school and was baptized on October 16, 1894. In December 1906, she went to the Kenwood Convent of the Sacred Heart in Albany, NY as a postulant and received her habit on April 20, 1907. (Note: In Two Manhattanville Nuns the date is given as April 20th and in the Sacred Heart Annual Letters the date is given as April 8th.) Stevens later joined the Society of the Sacred Heart in 1909.

== Career ==
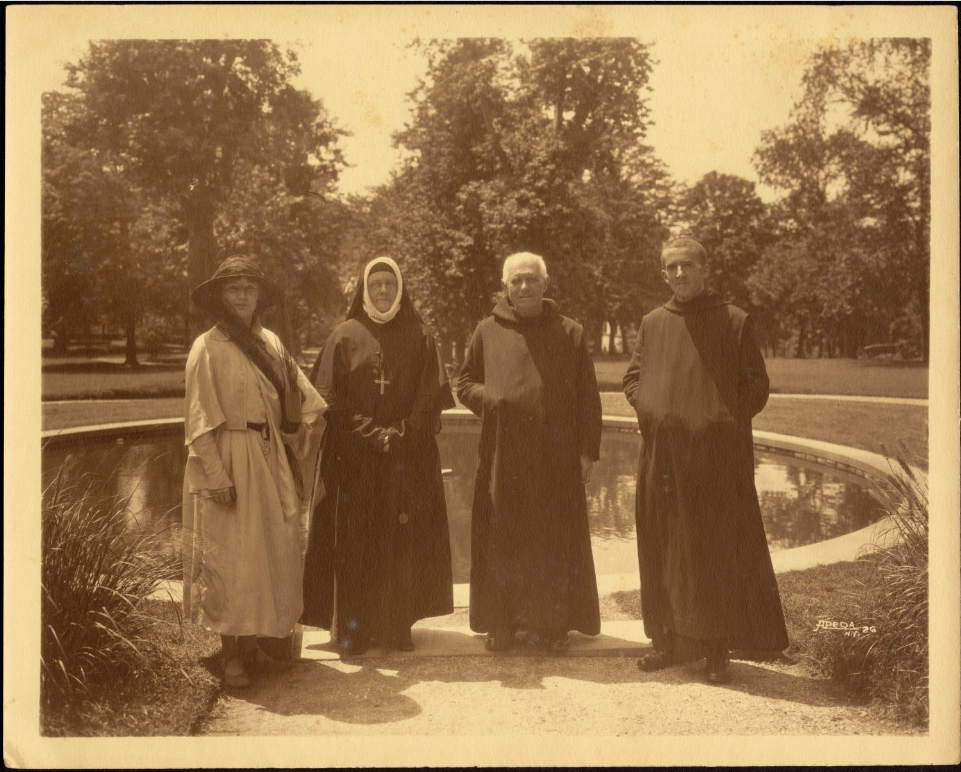
From left to right: Mrs. Justine Ward; Mother Georgia Stevens, R.S.C.J.; Dom Andre Mocquereau, O.S.B.; and Dom Jean-Hebert Desrocquettes, O.S.B. at Manhattanville College in 1922

After joining the Society of the Sacred Heart, Stevens returned to the United States and was assigned to the Manhattanville College of the Sacred Heart, now known as the Manhattanville College, in New York in 1914.

=== Pius X School of Liturgical Music ===
In 1916, Stevens and Justine Ward founded the Pius X School of Liturgical Music at the Manhattanville College. They held their first courses during the summer of 1917. Ward and Stevens taught the "Ward Method", a method of teaching Gregorian chant, at the school. During the academic year, classes were held for students and during the summer, programs were held for other music educators to train them in the Ward method.

Around 1930, Ward and Stevens had a disagreement in the use of the Ward method and the management of the Pius X School. This disagreement led to Ward resigning from the school in 1931. Following this separation Stevens began creating her Tone and Rhythm Series of textbooks for music educators and choral directors.

During the 1936 Biennial Convention of the Music Educators National Conference, Stevens was appointed to the Committee on Catholic School Music.

Mother Georgia Stevens died suddenly on March 28, 1946 at the Manhattanville College of the Sacred Heart. She was 75 years old.

== Works ==
Stevens wrote and recorded a variety of studies on Gregorian chant, tone and rhythm, choral music, and the teaching of these subjects. From 1935 to 1944, she released the Tone and Rhythm Series which includes six parts, they were also released with teachers' manuals and supplements. The first five books in the series were illustrated and lettered by George Vincent Deely, with the sixth book being illustrated and lettered by Bernard Glasgow. All six books and their accompaniments were published by the Macmillan Company. In Music-Land (1935), Climbing in Music-Land (1936), and La in Music-Land (1937) were accompanied by the Teachers' Manual to Accompany In Music-Land, Climbing in Music-Land, La in Music-Land (1937). Keys to Music-Land with a Gregorian Chant Supplement (1938), Surprises in Sound—Modulation with a Gregorian Chant Supplement (1939), and More Sounds—More with a Gregorian Chant Supplement (1941) were accompanied by Teachers' Manual to Accompany Book IV—Keys to Music-Land, Book V—Surprises in Sound—Modulation, Book VI—More Sounds—More Surprises (1941).

Beginning in 1940, Stevens published additional choral books beginning with Mediæval and Renaissance Choral Music, for Equal Voices a cappella (1940).

== See also ==
- Catholic sisters and nuns in the United States – American catholic nuns
