= Universidad del Sagrado Corazón =

University in Puerto Rico

University of the Sacred Heart
- Universidad del Sagrado Corazón
- Motto: Latin: Danti Mihi Sapientiam Dabo Gloriam
- Motto in English: I will give glory to Him who gives me wisdom
- Type: Private university
- Established: 1935; 91 years ago
- Affiliations: Liga Atlética Interuniversitaria
- President: Gilberto Marxuach Torrós
- Faculty: 126
- Students: 5,261
- Undergraduates: 4,643
- Postgraduates: 618
- Location: San Juan, Puerto Rico; 18.4425°N 66.0586°W
- Campus: Urban and suburban
- Colors: Burgundy
- Nickname: Dolphins
- Mascots: Delfy and Daphne
- Website: sagrado.edu

Universidad del Sagrado Corazón (English: University of the Sacred Heart, Latin: Universitas a Sacro Corde), abbreviated "USC" and often called simply Sagrado, is a private Catholic university in Santurce, San Juan, Puerto Rico. It is one of the oldest and largest educational institutions in Puerto Rico with origins dating back to the 1880 establishment of an elementary school by the Society of the Sacred Heart.

The university is situated in an area which was urbanized in the first decades of the twentieth century with great residences that belonged to the privileged families of the time and is rich in architectural styles. Renowned architect Antonín Nechodoma located his residence in Monteflores and some residences designed by him are still in the area. Including buildings with the unique French-style neoclassic architectural characteristics of the residence of Pablo Ubarri, Count of Santurce, which is now the center of the university's main campus. Such buildings abound along with Puerto Rican adaptations of Victorian architecture. There are also homes in the "tropical" U.S. influenced Mission Revival, French-gothic, Spanish Colonial Revival, Prairie School, and several apartment structures of the "Art Deco" periods in Bouret street.

== History ==
It was the year 1880 when three nuns of the Society of the Sacred Heart of Jesus landed on the docks of San Juan, coming from Havana, Cuba. Their mission was to establish in Puerto Rico the educational and spiritual work that just 80 years before Mother Madeleine Sophie Barat had begun in France.

At the beginning of the 20th century the institution acquired the Count of Santurce Estate and established the foundations of what makes-up today's campus.

In 1935, the local government issued the Letter Foundation, whereby it established the College of the Sacred Heart. Four years later, in 1939, the institution granted its first academic degrees. The original founding purpose was as an educational center for women in Puerto Rico to achieve ample knowledge, not only for their personal enrichment, but for the benefit of the territory.

In 1970, the religious order opted to transfer ownership and governance of the institution to the Board of Trustees (composed of some religious, but mostly lay members). This transition allowed for the notable expansion of academic offerings and student body.

In February 1972, a change in the institution's original vision took place. The Board of Trustees approved the establishment of an entirely co-ed institution. In December 1976, the Board of Trustees authorized the use of the new official name: "Universidad del Sagrado Corazon" (USC) or University of the Sacred Heart (USH). In 1985, the university established the first three graduate programs in: Education, Communications, and Business Administration.

In October 1984, Pope John Paul II held a mass at the university during the first and only Papal visit to Puerto Rico.

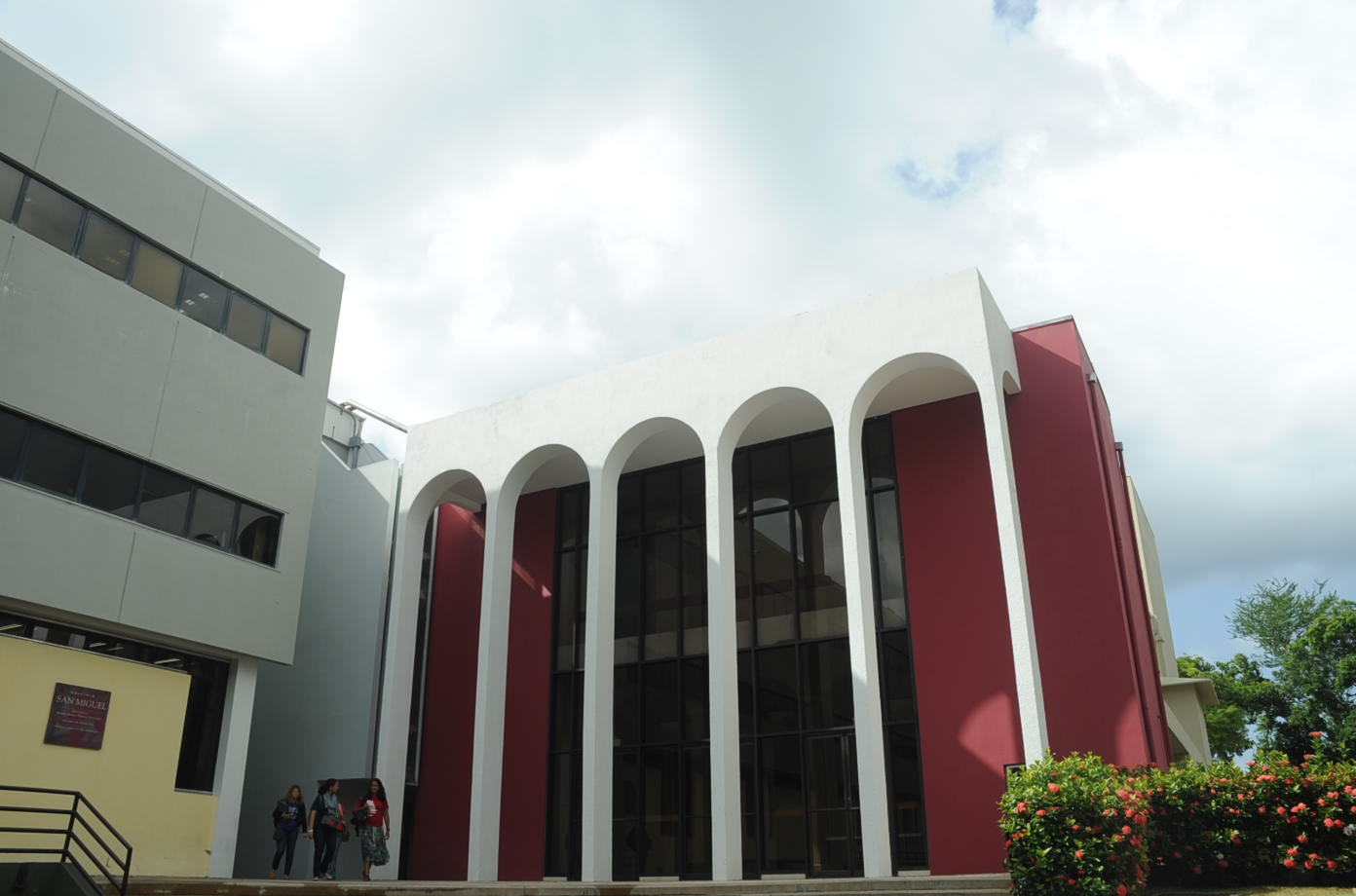
Emilio S. Belaval Theater (2012)

In 1990, the university began to limit the number of undergraduate students accepted, in order to raise academic standards.

In 1993, Sagrado Corazón began offering a cinema major led by Luis Molina. However, the advances in technology and an increase in the exposition of Hollywood and of foreign theater brands severely affected the viability of the courses. The institution also created production and filming curricula, with their own public communication school.

In January 2019, the division of continuing education was rebranded Sagrado Global, the School of Professional Studies at Sagrado, and started offering professional certificates in Digital marketing, Data Analytics, and Graphic Design, among others. These professional certificates, some of which are also offered remotely, require taking 6 courses and can be completed in 1 year or less.

In 2019, the university had its first School of Music graduates with seven obtaining a Bachelor of Arts in music. In 2019, Socorro Juliá- one of the oldest faces of the university was interviewed by El Vocero. She stated that she has been affiliated with the university since she was 5 years old, long before her religious calling.

In 2019, the university joined forced with the Santurce Cultural Center in an initiative to help business owners by offering free business workshops and help local business explore ways to grow their business.

== Campus ==
- Administration Building
- U.S. National Register of Historic Places
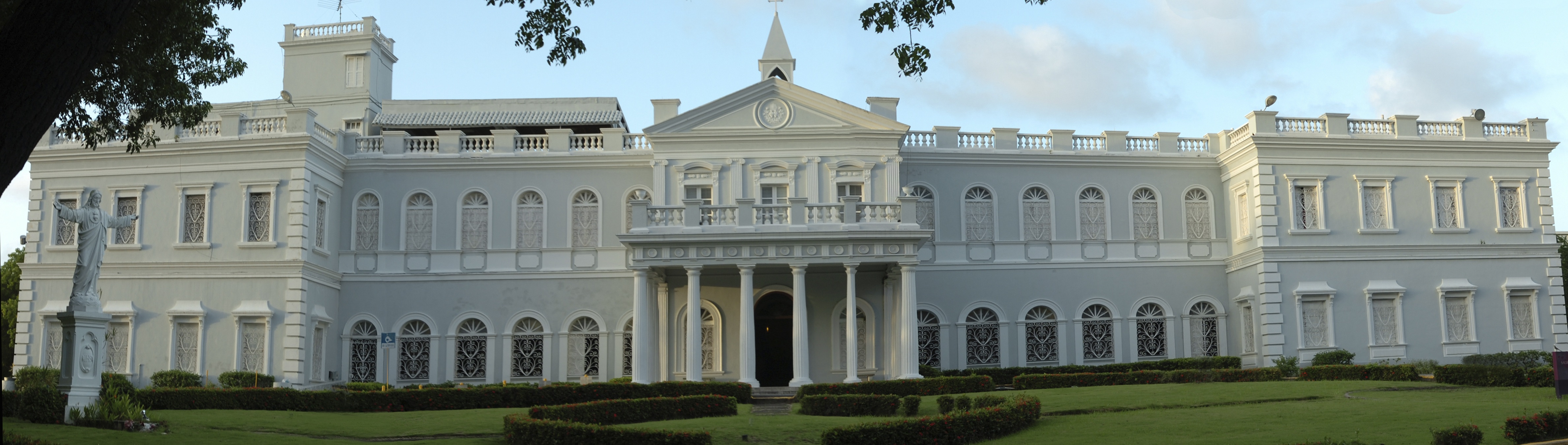
- Panoramic view of the Administration Building, commonly known as El Portico.

- Location within Puerto Rico
- Location: Santurce, San Juan, Puerto Rico
- Coordinates: 18°26′33″N 66°3′32″W
- Built: 1906
- Architects: Luis Gonzalez, Jose Antonio Vilaro Canals
- Architectural style: Classical Revival
- NRHP reference No.: 83004195
- Added to NRHP: October 26, 1983

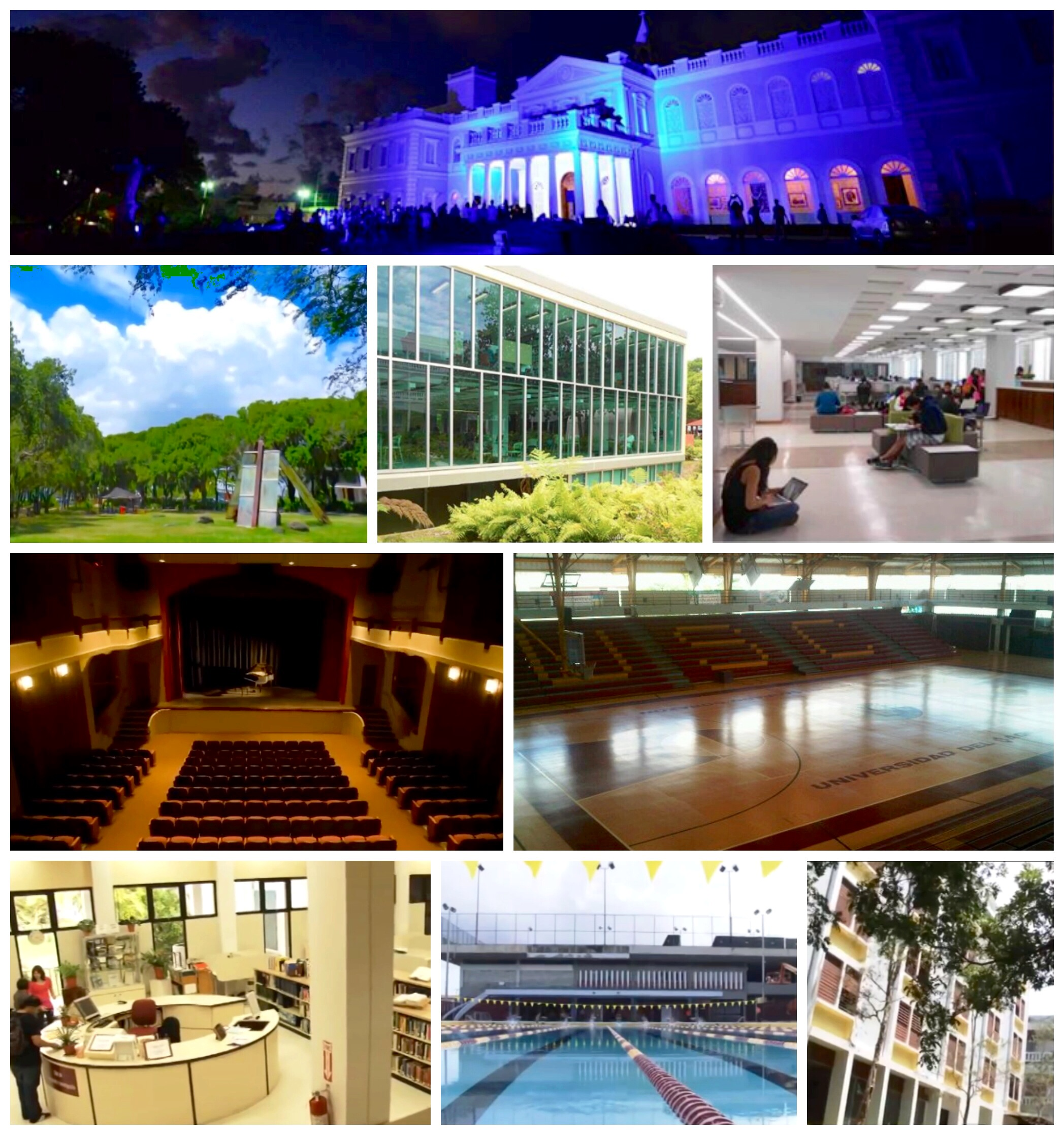
Campus collage

The campus of the University of the Sacred Heart is composed of 33 acres (130,000 m^{2}) of undulating terrain and shading, from whose height can see panoramic views of the ocean and surrounding urban areas. The university campus features abundant vegetation, including forests of tropical plants that contribute to the campus's landscape.

For the development of its activities, the university has the following facilities: the broad main building architecture classical, lifted at the beginning of the twentieth century, which today accommodates the administrative offices and in whose center is home to the Chapel of the Institution, which was listed in the National Register of Historic Places in 1983, the residence of the Religious of the Sacred Heart, the Information and Resource Center Modern facilities of the library. Then followed the student Residences, modern style, and south of the earlier, a complex structure consisting of classrooms, administrative and faculty offices, and an amphitheater.

The Mother Maria Teresa Guevara Library, one of the vital units of the university for his significant educational role, offers services to teachers, students, administrators and other members of the university community.

The Emilio S. Belaval Theater serves the development of a comprehensive program of artistic, cultural and academic development. A modern student center and sports complex to accommodate several service offices and fitness facilities, indoor stadium, tennis court, Olympic pool, meeting rooms and cafeteria.

Among the major academic resources at the disposal of the university, can be singled out the library, laboratories, Communication and technology education, science laboratories, languages, nursing and television studios and recordings.

Courses and certificates for working professionals are offered through Sagrado Global, the School of Professional Studies at Sagrado. With close to 4,000 annual participants, the primary disciplines taught at Sagrado Global include Data Science & Analytics, Digital Marketing, Graphic Design, Entrepreneurship, Languages, Technology, Web Design, among others.

== Accreditation and affiliations ==
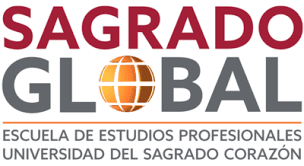
Logo of Sagrado's School of Professional Studies

The University of the Sacred Heart is accredited by the following regional institutions:

- Council of Higher Education of Puerto Rico
- Council on Social Work Education (Social Work Program)
- Middle States Association of Colleges and Schools
- National Accrediting Agency for Clinical Laboratory Sciences (Program Medical Technology)
- National League for Nursing (Nursing Program)

The school is affiliated with the following organizations:

- Alliance Française
- American Library Association
- American Association of Collegiate Registrars and Admissions Officers
- American Association for Higher Education
- American Medical Association
- American Association of University Administration
- Association for Educational Communications and Technology
- Association of Private Colleges and Universities
- Manufacturers' Association of Puerto Rico
- Association of University Presidents of Puerto Rico
- Association of Universities and Research Institutes in the Caribbean
- Association of American Colleges
- Association of Catholic Colleges and Universities
- Association of Colleges and Universities Auditors
- Association of Governing Boards of Universities and Colleges
- Chamber of Commerce of Puerto Rico
- College Entrance Examination Board
- Council of International Education
- International Federation of Catholic Universities
- Hispanic Association of Colleges and Universities
- International Association for Continuing Education and Training (IACET)
- Institute of Internal Auditors
- Middle States Association of Colleges and Schools
- National Association of Colleges and University Business Officers
- National Association of Colleges and Universities
- National Association of Independent Colleges and Universities
- National Association of Student Financial Aid
- National Student Exchange.

== Presidents and rectors ==
- 1951: Madre Dolores Sarre, RSCJ
- 1951 - 1954: Madre Consuelo Herrera
- 1954 - 1955: Madre Raquel Pérez
- 1955 - 1967: Madre Rosa Aurora Arsuaga
- 1968 - 1969: Madre Eleanor O'Byrne
- 1969 - 1970: Madre María Milagros Carbonell
- 1970 - 1972: Rafael García Bottari
- 1972 - 1986: Pedro González Ramos
- 1986 - 1992: José Alberto Morales
- 1992 - 2014: José Jaime Rivera
- 2014–Present: Gilberto Marxuach Torrós

== Notable alumni ==
- Raymond Arrieta - actor, comedian, musician and host
- María Elena Batista - 1988 Olympic swimmer, longest-serving Director of Sports in San Juan, USC Athletic Director
- Giannina Braschi, author of "United States of Banana", "Yo-Yo Boing!"and "Empire of Dreams"
- Norma Candal - actress and comedian
- Doreen Colondres - chef, food writer, television presenter and sommelier.
- Dreuxilla Divine - drag queen, female impersonator, TV personality, actress.
- Carmen Dominicci - news anchor and television reporter
- Juan Eugenio Hernández Mayoral - former senator
- Adamari López - actress and television host
- Nery Santos Gómez - author
- Teresa López - artist and graphic designer
- Melanie Maher - singer, actress and model
- Héctor Martínez - former Senator
- Lila Mayoral Wirshing - First Lady of Puerto Rico (1972–1977, 1985–1993)
- Karla Monroig - actress, model and television host
- Viviana Ortiz - Miss Universe Puerto Rico 2011
- Gilluis Pérez - actor
- Ivette Perfecto - ecologist
- Kimmey Raschke - journalist, politician
- Vilma Reyes (born 1958) - poet, storyteller and educator
- Birmania Rios - television journalist
- Rocky the Kid - Puerto Rican radio and television personality and actor
- Yara Sofia - female impersonator and reality television personality
- Luz María Umpierre - poet, scholar and human rights activist
- Villano Antillano - rapper and songwriter
- Otto Oppenheimer - television personality
