= Grabów, Warsaw =

Neighbourhood of Warsaw, Poland

Grabów
- City Information System area (neighbourhood)
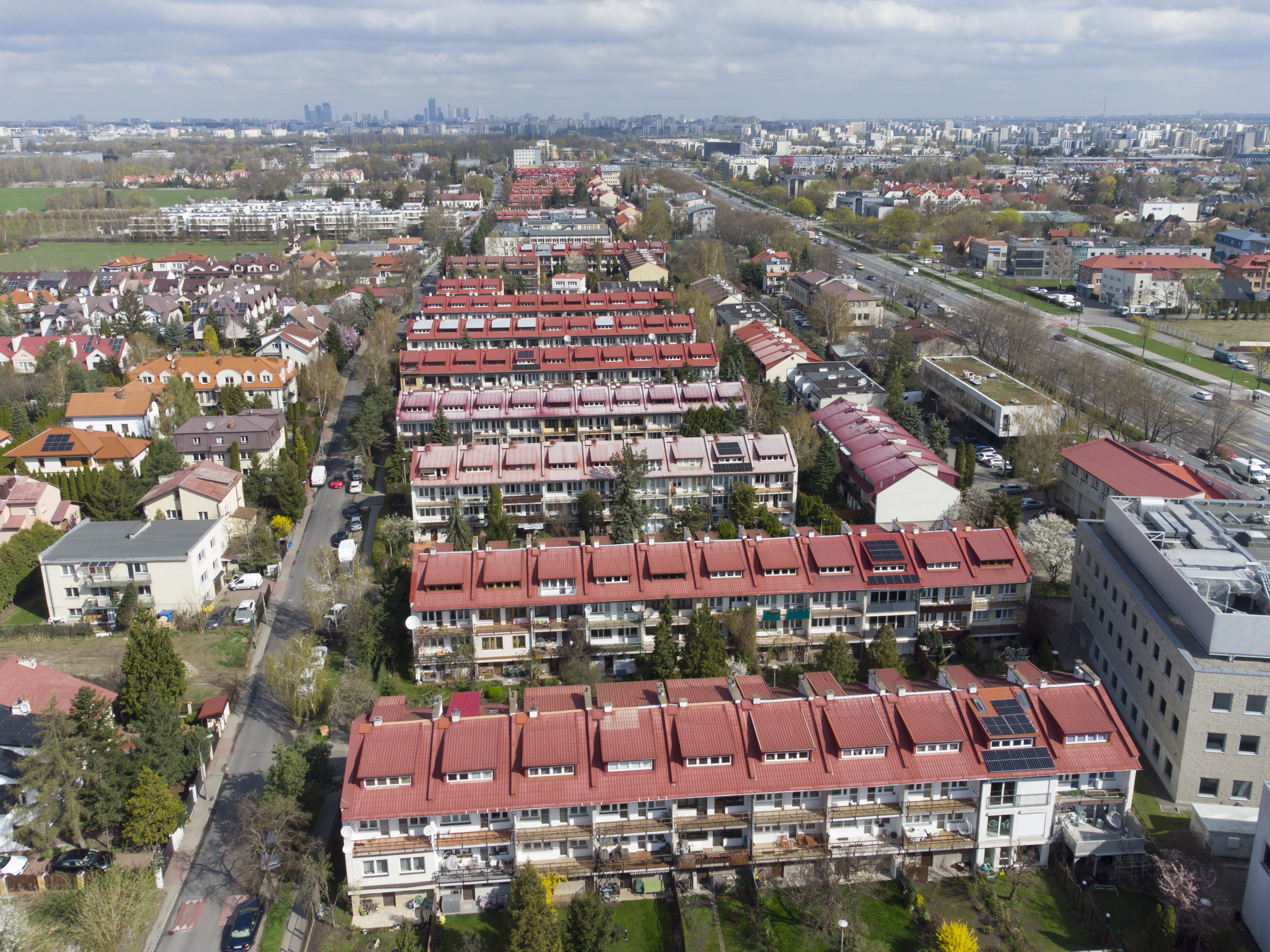
- The housing estate of Grabów near Puławska Street.

- The location of Grabów within Ursynów.
- Coordinates: 52°08′42″N 21°00′58″E
- Country: Poland
- Voivodeship: Masovian
- City and county: Warsaw
- District: Ursynów
- Time zone: UTC+1 (CET)
  - Summer (DST): UTC+2 (CEST)
- Area code: +48 22

Grabów (Polish: [ˈɡra.buf]) is a neighbourhood, and a City Information System area, located in the Ursynów district of Warsaw, Poland. It is a residential area, predominantly with low-rise housing. The neighbourhood consists of three historic neighbourhoods, Stary Grabów, Grabówek, and Krasnowola, as well as the housing estate of Grabów, composed of terraced house. It also features the Advanced Materials and Technologies Centre, the largest high tech research facilities in Poland.

The oldest known records of Grabów, then a small village, date to the 18th century. In the 19th century, the villages of Grabówek, and Krasnowola were founded nearby. The area was incorporated into the city in 1951. In the 1980s and 1990s, the housing estate of Grabów was developed.

== History ==
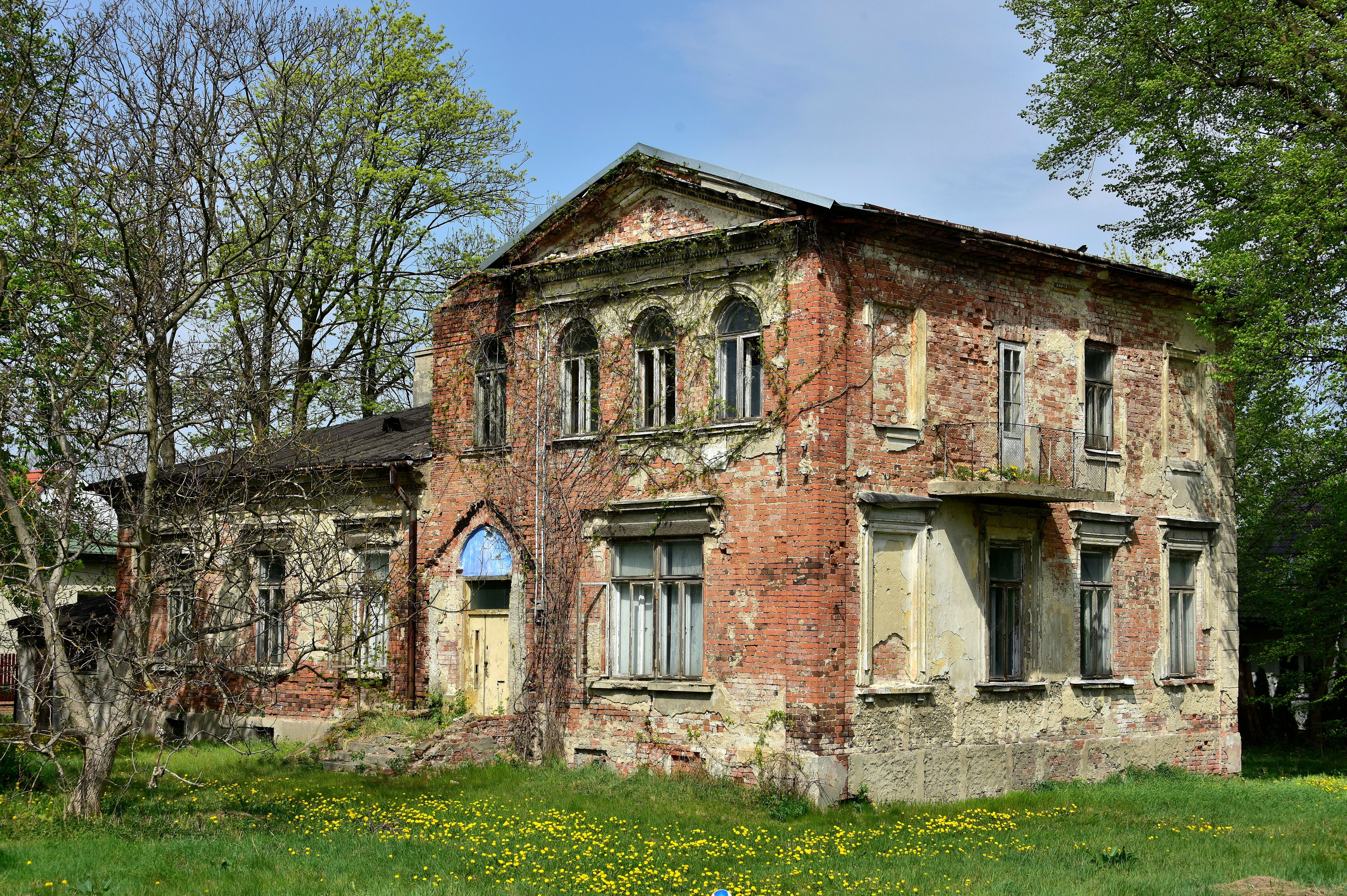
The Krasnowola Manor House, built in the 19th century.

The oldest known records of Grabów, then a small village known as Grabowo, date to the 18th century. It was founded by Warsaw deputy cup-bearer Grabowski, on the farmlands of Imielin and Wyczółki.

In the 19th century, the Krasnowola was founded to the southeast of Grabów, around current Krasnowolska Street. In the second half of the century, a residence of castellan Kretkowski, was built at the current 78 Krasnowolska Street the Krasnowola Manor House. The hamlet of Grabówek was founded to the south of Grabów. In 1827, Grabów had 67 inhabitants in 9 households, in 1905, it had 157 inhabitants, and in 1921, it had 111 inhabitants in 21 households.

In 1898, the Grabów Emilin narrow-gauge railway station was established between Grabów and Imielin, at the current intersection of Puławska and Mysikrólika Streets. It was operated by the Grójec Commuter Railway, as part of the line between stations of Warszawa Mokotów and Nowe Miasto nad Pilicą, and was closed down in 1957.

In 1938, the nuns of the Society of the Sacred Heart settled in Grabów, establishing a chappel near their housing. In 1952, it became a parish church, and between 1990 and 1995, in its place was built the St. Sophie Barat Church. Additionally, in 1995, Grabów Cemetery was founded at Poloneza Street. It is located in the nearby neighbourhood of Wyczółki, near the boundary of Grabów.

On 8 September 1939, Grabów was captured by the German forces during the siege of Warsaw in the Second World War.

On 14 May 1951, Grabów, Grabówek, and Krasnowola were incorporated into the city.

In 1980, at 20 Korowodu Street was opened the Christian Mission Centre of the Salesians of Don Bosco, and the Salesian Mission Museum, with over 3000 exponates.

In the 1980s and 1990s, the housing estate of Grabów, composed of terraced houses, was built between Puławska Street, Mączyńskiego Street, Taneczna Street, and Grabów Canal. It was designed by Zbigniew Panek, Krystyna Szedna, and Andrzej Wolski, and developed by the Grabów Intercompany Housing Association (Polish: Międzyzakładowa Spółdzielnia Mieszkaniowa „Grabów”).

In 1998, the district of Ursynów was subdivided into the areas of the City Information System, with Grabów becoming one of them. The area included Grabów, as well as Grabówek, and Krasnowola. In 2000, its boundaries were modified, with an area between Wyczółki Street, Puławska Street, Poleczki Street, and Galopu Street, being incorporated from North Ursynów.

In 2016, the Advanced Materials and Technologies Centre was opened at 19 Poleczki Street, becoming one of the largest high tech research facilities in Poland.

== Characteristics ==
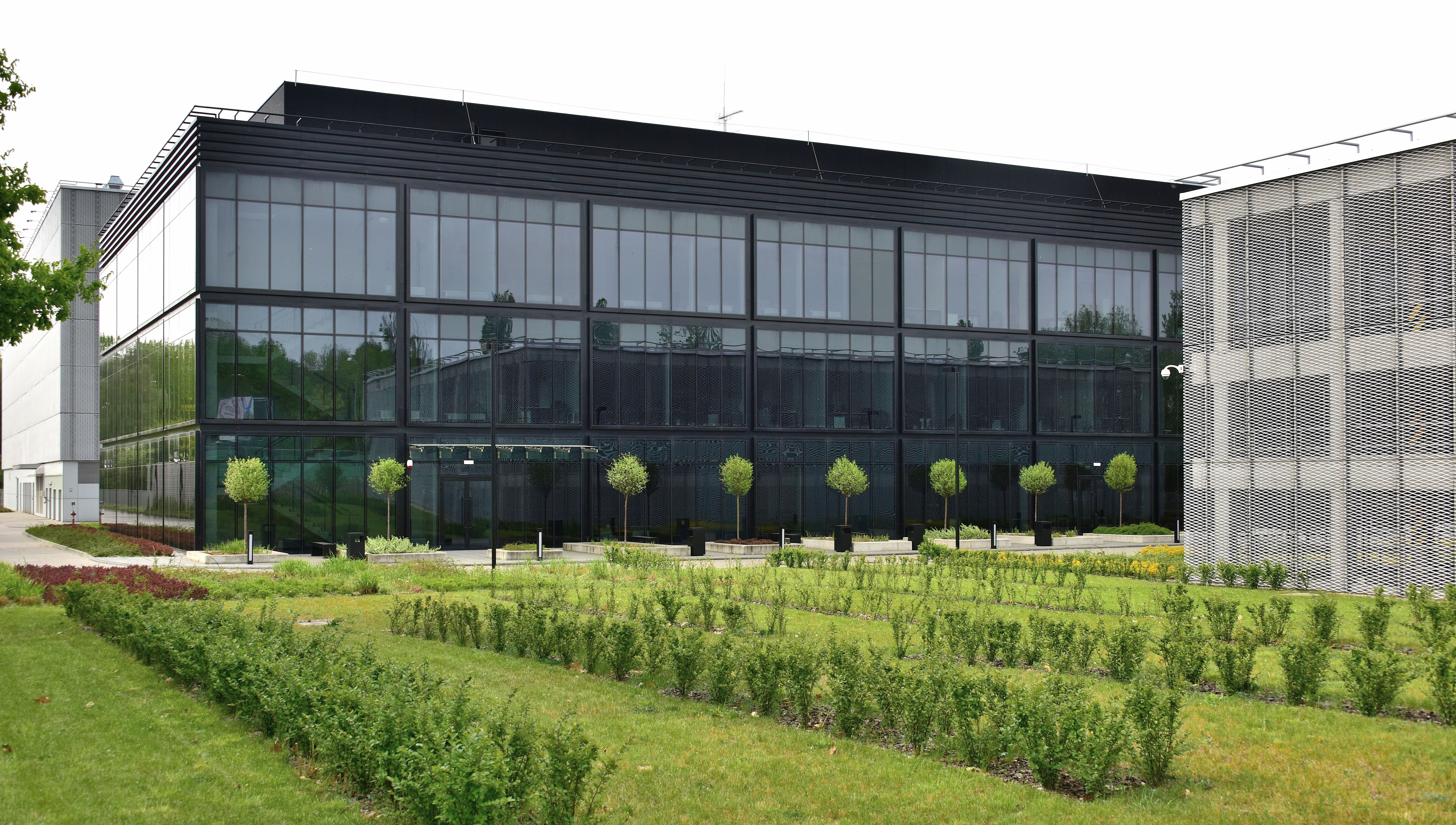
The Advanced Materials and Technologies Centre, one of the largest high tech research facilities in Poland.

Grabów is a low- and mid-rise residential area. Its small portion also includes farmlands. The neighbourhood consists of three historical neighbourhoods with single-family detached home, including Stary Grabów in the east, Grabówek, Warsaw in the southeast, and Krasnowola in the southwest, as well as the housing estate of Grabów in the southeast, consisting of the terraced house.

The neighbourhood features the Advanced Materials and Technologies Centre, one of the largest high tech research facilities in Poland, located at 19 Poleczki Street. Fathermore, within is boundaries is also present the Krasnowola Manor House, a historical residence build in the 19th century, placed at 78 Krasnowolska Street.

Grabów also features the St. Sophie Barat Church at 65 Taneczna Street, belonging to the Catholic denomination, together with the monastery of the Society of the Sacred Heart. Near the neighbourhood boundary, at Poloneza Street, is the Grabów Cemetery, administrated by a local church. Furthermore, the area also includes the Christian Mission Centre of the Salesians of Don Bosco, and the Salesian Mission Museum, with over 3,000 exhibits, located at 20 Korowodu Street.

Additionally, the neighbourhood includes the Zabłocki Lake, situated near Krasnowolska and Poloneza Streets, measuring 0.92 ha, and is crossed by Grabów and Imielin canals. On its boundary is the Grabów Lake, located near Pląsy, Hołubcowa, and Poloneza Streets.

== Location and boundaries ==
Grabów is a City Information System area located within the north-western portion of the Ursynów district. To the north, its border is determined by Pląsy Street, Poloneza Street, Wyczółki Street, and around the building at 270 Puławska Street; to the east, by Puławska Street; to the south, by the Warsaw Metro branch line, and in a line west from its crossing with Karnawał Street; and to the west, by the tracks of the railway line no. 8. It borders North Ursynów, and Wyczółki to the north, Stary Imielin to the east, Jeziorki Północne to the south, and Paluch to the west. Its western boundary form the border between districts of Ursynów and Włochy.
