= Vilma Reyes =

Puerto Rican poet, storyteller and educator

not to be confused with Honduran politician and dentist Vilma Reyes Escalante.

Vilma Reyes Díaz (born 1958) is a Puerto Rican poet. She has served as a teacher of Spanish language and has chaired the International Poetry Festival in Puerto Rico (Festival Internacional de Poesía en Puerto Rico) since 2010. She has been an influence on young Puerto Ricans in literary creation by offering free workshops for children and youth poetry and has published several books as a result of that work.

== Biography ==
Vilma Reyes Díaz was born 2 September 1958 in Río Piedras, Puerto Rico. She enjoyed literature from an early age, writing her first work, a school play, at age 10. In 1980, she earned her Bachelor of Arts degree in French Language and Literature at the Universidad del Sagrado Corazón (University of the Sacred Heart) in Santurce, Puerto Rico. Her thesis, entitled "El Suícidio, el último recurso para la felicidad de Madame Bovary" (Suicide, the last resort for the happiness of Madame Bovary) was provocative and caused a mixed reaction from students and faculty, but she received praise from the President of the French Alliance of Puerto Rico and earned her degree.

After graduation, she married fellow poet, Antonio Rosa Montañez, with whom she had two children, Antonio Rosa Reyes and Linda Rosa Reyes. She completed her Master of Arts from the Interamerican University of Puerto Rico, and then obtained a Spanish Teaching Diploma for secondary schools. She was accepted to the Doctoral Program of the Faculty of Humanities at the University of Puerto Rico, Río Piedras Campus, where she studies Hispanic-American literature.

In 2001, she founded a Poetry Forum called "Canto Poético" (Poetic singing) to allow poets to share their works internationally and participated in the First Celebration of Literary Magazines by The House of the Peruvian Poets held in Barranca, Peru in November 2004. The following year, in 2005, she participated in the First International Encounter of the poets "Matilde Alba Swann" and "Manuel Agustín Aguirre" held in Loja, Ecuador. She received an Honorary Degree from the Universidad Nacional de Loja (National University of Loja).

She is the editor of the literary magazine En Sentido Figurado and has written several textbooks which are in use in Puerto Rico and the United States. She has also served as a teacher of Spanish language and has chaired the International Poetry Festival in Puerto Rico (Festival Internacional de Poesía en Puerto Rico since 2010. She is a member of the World Poetry Movement which was founded in 2011. She has also participated in the Havana International Festival of Poetry and the Carlos Pellicer Iberoamerican Poetry Meeting in Tabasco, Mexico.

Her poems have been published in numerous anthologies and literary journals including: Revista Prometeo (Medellín), Ventana de Luz y de Armonía at the Universidad Autónoma de Loja, Ecuador; Antología Internacional de Poesía Amorosa (Lima); Antología Mar de por medio (España); Libro Verde (México); Revista Guajana (Puerto Rico); El Cuervo (Puerto Rico); Luciérnaga of the University of Puerto Rico; Revista En Sentido Figurado (Puerto Rico) and Remolinos, among others.

== Selected works ==
=== Poems ===
- Amanecí
- A Medias
- Dudas
- Hipnosis
- Indefinido
- Sexto Insomnio
- Séptimo Insomnio
- Octavo Insomnio
- Noveno Insomnio
- Décimo Insomnio
- Undécimo Insomnio
- Duodécimo Insomnio
- Cuarta Lluvia
- Quinta Lluvia
- Octava Lluvia
- Parpadeos
- Qué Decir
- Rezo en tu Piel
- Rutinas
- Su Rostro

=== Books ===
- Versos para la lluvia Insomne Los Libros de la Iguana: San Juan, Puerto Rico (2010) (in Spanish)
