= Mary Aloysia Hardey =

American nun (1809-1886)

Mary Aloysia Hardey, R.S.C.J., (1809 – 17 June 1886) was an American religious sister of the Society of the Sacred Heart. She established all the convents of her order, up to the year 1883, in the eastern part of the United States as well as in Canada and Cuba.

== Life ==
Mary Hardey was born in Piscataway, Maryland, United States. Both her parents (Frederick Hardey and Sarah Spalding) were descended from old Maryland Catholic families. While she was a child, the family moved to Opelousas, Louisiana, and she became in (1822) one of the first pupils of the Sacred Heart Convent in Grand Coteau. She entered the congregation upon the completion of her studies, at which time she was given the name Sister Mary Aloysia. The young Sister showed such capability that she was placed in charge of the Sisters' convent school in St. Michael, Louisiana and upon her taking final vows, was made Superior of the convent.

Bishop John Dubois having invited the Society to New York in 1840, Mothers Galitzin and Hardey opened the Society's first convent in the Eastern United States on Houston Street in lower Manhattan, later located uptown on Aqueduct Avenue, and now established in Greenwich, Connecticut. A visit to Rome, the blessing of Pope Gregory XVI, and a sojourn with Mother Barat in France, prepared Mother Hardey for her future work.

The list of thirty convents, of which some are now closed, represents the work of more than forty years (from New York, 1841, to Atlantic City, 1883): Albany (New York), Astoria (New York), Atlantic City (New Jersey), Boston (Massachusetts), Buffalo (New York) -moved to Rochester, Cincinnati (Ohio), Clifton (Cincinnati, Ohio), Detroit (Michigan), Eden Hall (Torresdale, Pennsylvania), Elmhurst (Rhode Island), Grosse Pointe (Michigan), Halifax (Nova Scotia), Havana (Cuba), Kenwood (Albany, New York), London (Ontario), Montreal (Quebec), McSherrystown (Pennsylvania), Manhattanville (New York), New York City (Aqueduct Avenue and Madison Avenue), Philadelphia (Pennsylvania), Providence (Rhode Island), Rochester (New York), Rosecroft (Maryland), Sancti Spiritus (Cuba), Sandwich (Ontario), Sault-au-Recollet (Montreal), Saint Jacques (Quebec), Saint John (New Brunswick), St Vincent (Quebec).

She was named Provincial Superior in 1844. In this capacity, she made ten voyages to Europe, five to Cuba, and constant journeyings, acting either as Mother Provincial or Visitatrix (the office of an outside examiner of community life). Her main concern was not the founding of convents but the formation of fervent religious as consecrated teachers. During the American Civil War, with Northern leaders her influence was exerted on behalf of Southern convents and she herself, passing through contending armies, brought aid to the southwestern houses. Benefactions went to Cuban homes, 1860–70; to Chicago, after its great fire; to France, 1870–71; to the South, when ravaged with fever.

In 1859 she suffered a stroke that impaired her ability to write, and she was forced to dictate here letters to a secretary.

She provided twenty-five free schools in the States and Canada. Kenwood in Albany, New York, became her residence and the novices' home in 1866 when she erected the buildings which later contained the general novitiate for North America.

In 1871 she was appointed Assistant Superior General, an office requiring residence in the general motherhouse in Paris. She inspected first, as Visitatrix, all convents of the Society in the United States and Canada and embarked for Europe in 1872. She aided the various Superiors General in visitations and foundations of French and Spanish convents, still supervising those of America. She came back to America on her official visits in 1874, 1878, 1882. In 1884 she returned to Paris as member of the general council. She died in Paris on June 17, 1886.

She was buried in Conflans crypt, the tomb of the general administrators. Due to the anti-clerical hostility of the French government to religious orders at the beginning of the twentieth century (which later resulted in the expulsion of most religious orders in 1904 and the confiscation of their properties), on 12 December 1900, she was re-interred at Kenwood, Albany.
