= Harriet Padberg =

American mathematician, composer

Sr. Harriet Padberg
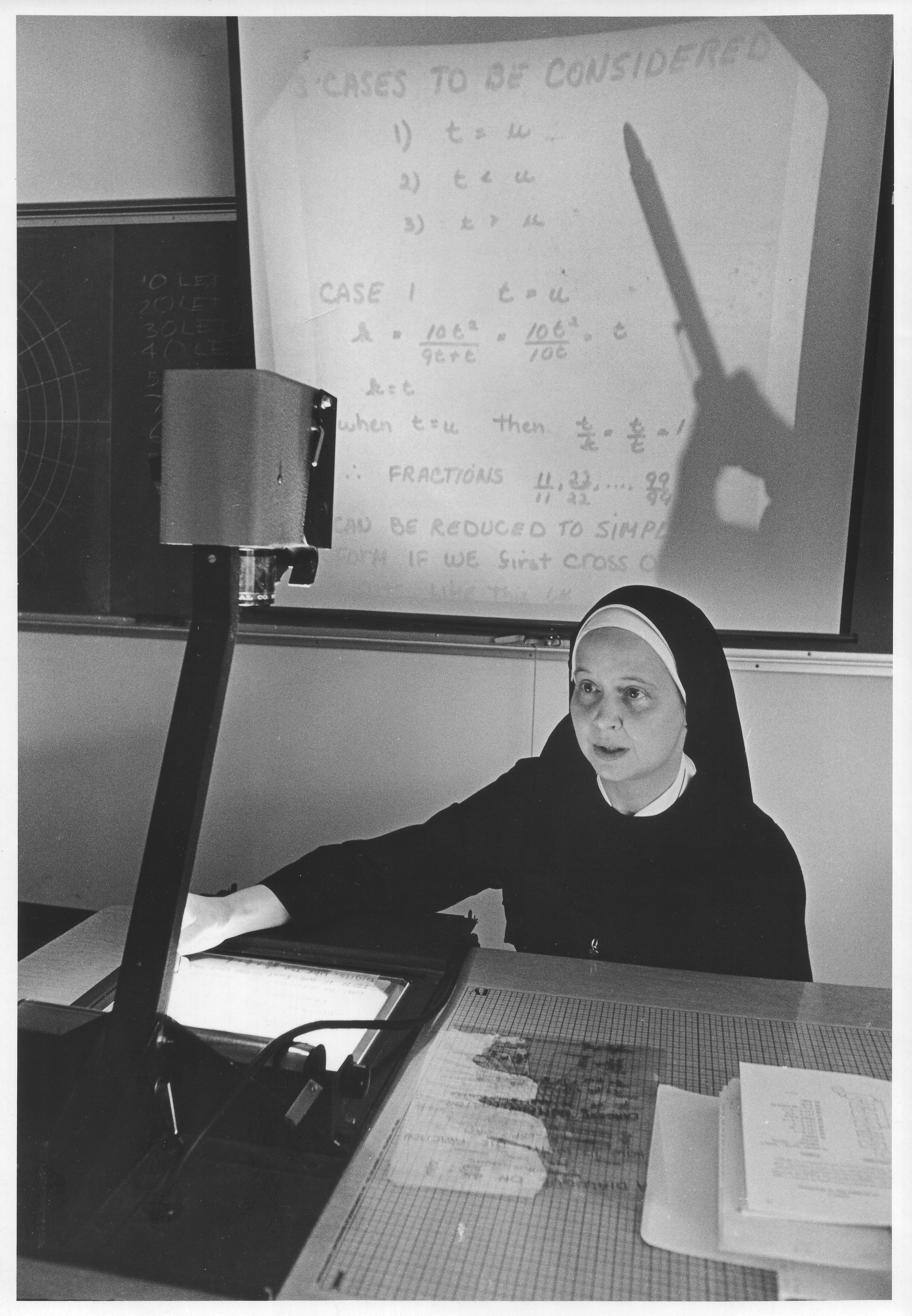
- Padberg teaching at Maryville University
- Born: 13 November 1922; St. Louis, Missouri
- Died: 2 January 2014 (aged 91); Atherton, California
- Education: Maryville College of the Sacred Heart, now Maryville University
- Scientific career
- Fields: Music, Mathematics
- Thesis: Computer Composed Canon and Free Fugue

Harriet Padberg, RSCJ was an American mathematician, composer, music therapist, and Catholic religious sister. She was a pioneer in the music therapy field, and also held significant contributions in the field of computer-composed music. Padberg wrote Computer-Composed Canon and Free Fugue as part of her 1964 dissertation in Mathematics and Music at Saint Louis University. She was a professor for over 35 years, before retiring in her mid-70's and working as a music therapist.

== Education and Vocation ==
Padberg attended the Academy of the Sacred Heart in St. Louis, Missouri, and was awarded a scholarship to Maryville College, now Maryville University, where she graduated in 1943 with a Bachelor of Arts in Math and Music. Soon after, she joined the Society of the Sacred Heart, serving briefly at Schools of the Sacred Heart around the nation, including Grand Coteau, Louisiana. In 1948 she returned to serve at the Academy of the Sacred Heart of St. Charles, while simultaneously earning her master's degree in Music and Organ from the College Conservatory of Music, in 1949. Padberg made her final profession in 1951, becoming a professed Sister of the Sacred Heart.

In 1951, Padberg returned to Grand Coteau to serve as both secondary school teacher and professor for four years. She then served at Maryville College for a year, then another year at the Academy of the Sacred Heart in St. Louis, and finally returned to Maryville College, where she would teach for 35 years.

Padberg acquired a Ph.D. in Math as well as a Master of Arts from St. Louis University in 1959, and took an internship in music therapy.

== Computer Composed Canon and Free Fugue ==
Padberg's 1964 dissertation paper was likely the first on algorithmic composition. Her program was notable in that it was algorithmic, rather than random like her contemporaries. The program read a string of up to 160 characters, and assigned each letter to one of 24 indexed frequencies in a series of overtones for some root note. At the same time, it divided into blocks of five letters or more, and indexed each. The algorithm then takes in more metadata to determine factors such as rhythm. A tone row is determined from the first blocks to contain 24 or fewer characters, and comprises the melody line. This prime form is then varied and transposed to create a composition, and is output onto a series of punch cards with two columns: one to list the melody in piano roll format, and one to list the "number of units of the rhythmic pattern"

Sister Padberg wrote two algorithms in the programming language FORTRAN, both of which were printed in her dissertation. The first was to be used with the IBM 1620, and due to technical limitations, was only capable of composing canons in one voice. She later rewrote the program for the IBM 7072, which allowed for canons of two to four voices, and canons with up to three prime tone rows in two voices. This second program also allowed for the creation of the "free fugue."

Padberg's work in algorithmic composition emulated her interest in 20th century Serialism. Two of Padberg's earliest experiments included a composition transposed from the name of Johann Sebastian Bach, which she titled the "J. S. Bach Fugue", as well as a fugue created from the words of John F. Kennedy's inaugural speech, "Ask not what your country can do for you; ask what you can do for your country," which she titled "Patriotic Fugue."

== Music Therapy ==
After writing her dissertation and attaining her third degree, Sister Padberg studied Music Therapy at the Education of Handicapped Children and Youth. In 1973, she founded the Music Therapy program at Maryville University, which is now accredited by the National Association of Schools of Music and approved by the American Music Therapy Association. Padberg presented papers to the American Music Therapy Association, and was an active member in the National Association of Music Therapy. She retired in 1992, but continued to practice music therapy and teach music until 2012.

== Bibliography ==
- Ariza, Christopher (2011). "Two Pioneering Projects from the Early History of Computer-Aided Algorithmic Composition". Computer Music Journal. 35 (3): 40–56. doi:10.1162/COMJ_a_00068. hdl:1721.1/68626. ISSN 0148-9267. JSTOR 41241764. S2CID 15346423.
- "Harriet Padberg, RSCJ". RSCJ.org. Society of the Sacred Heart. 2 January 2014.
- Padberg, Harriet Ann (1964). Computer-composed canon and free fugue (Thesis). OCLC 143354282. S2CID 63576455.
- Rice, Patricia (6 January 2014). "Sister Harriet Padberg: Pioneer In Music Therapy, Longtime Teacher". St. Louis Public Radio.
- Savery, Richard; et al. (2019). "Learning from History: Recreating and Repurposing Sister Harriet Padberg's Computer Composed Canon and Free Fugue". arXiv:1907.04470 [cs].
