= Krasnowola =

Neighbourhood in Warsaw, Poland

- Neighbourhood
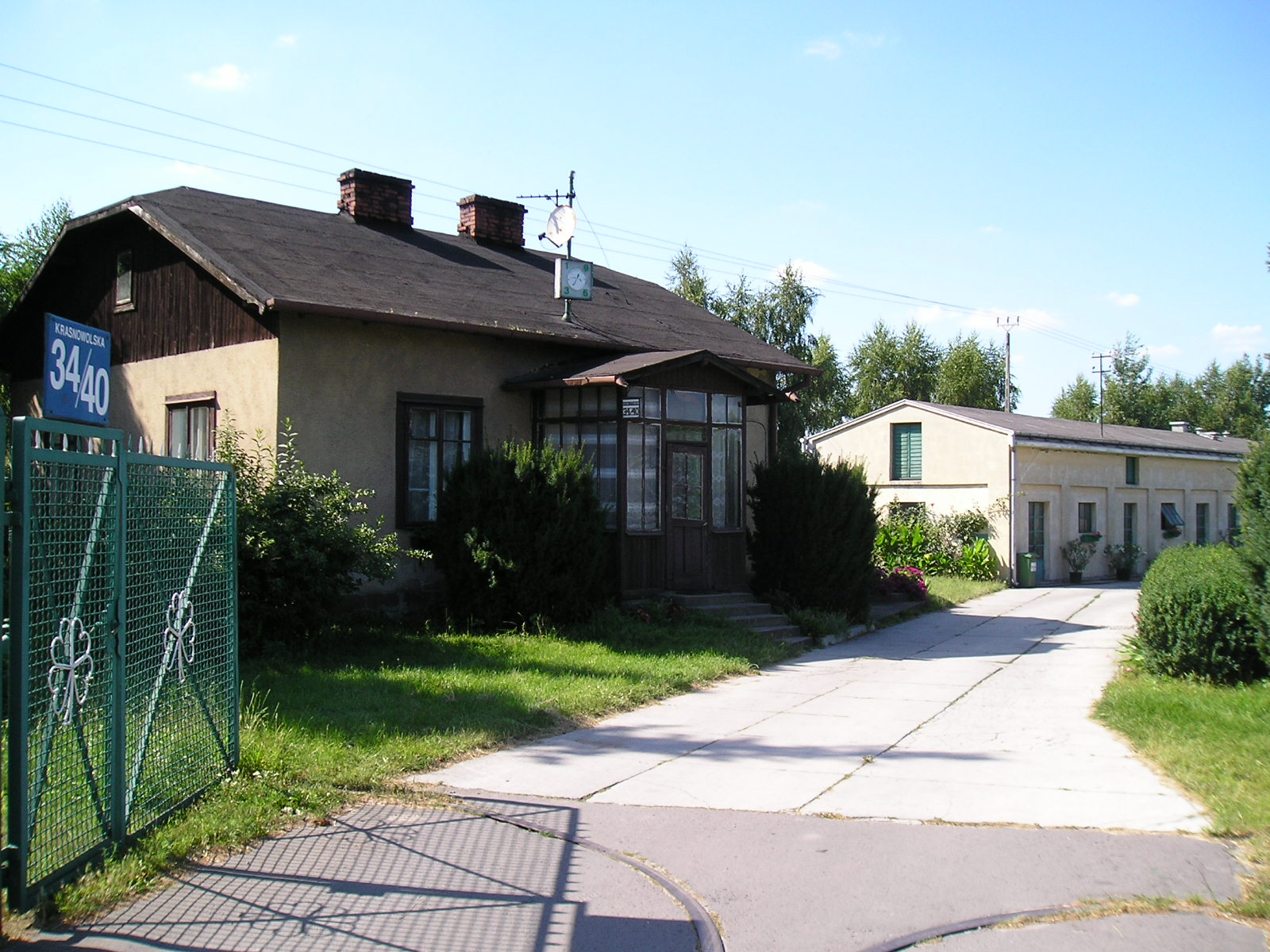
- Buildings at Krasnowolska Street in Krasnowola, in 2019.
- Interactive map of Krasnowola
- Coordinates: 52°08′33″N 20°59′57″E
- Country: Poland
- Voivodeship: Masovian
- City and county: Warsaw
- District: Ursynów
- City Information System area: Grabów
- Time zone: UTC+1 (CET)
  - Summer (DST): UTC+2 (CEST)
- Area code: +48 22

Krasnowola (Polish: [kras.nɔˈvɔ.la]) is a neighbourhood in Warsaw, Poland, located within the Ursynów district, in the City Information System area of Grabów. It is centred around Krasnowolska Street, and mostly consists of single-family detached homes. The village of Krasnowola was founded in the 19th century, to the southeast of Grabówek. The Krasnowola Manor House was constructed in the area in the second half of the 19th century, the Krasnowola Manor House was constructed. In 1951, the village was incorporated into the city.

== History ==
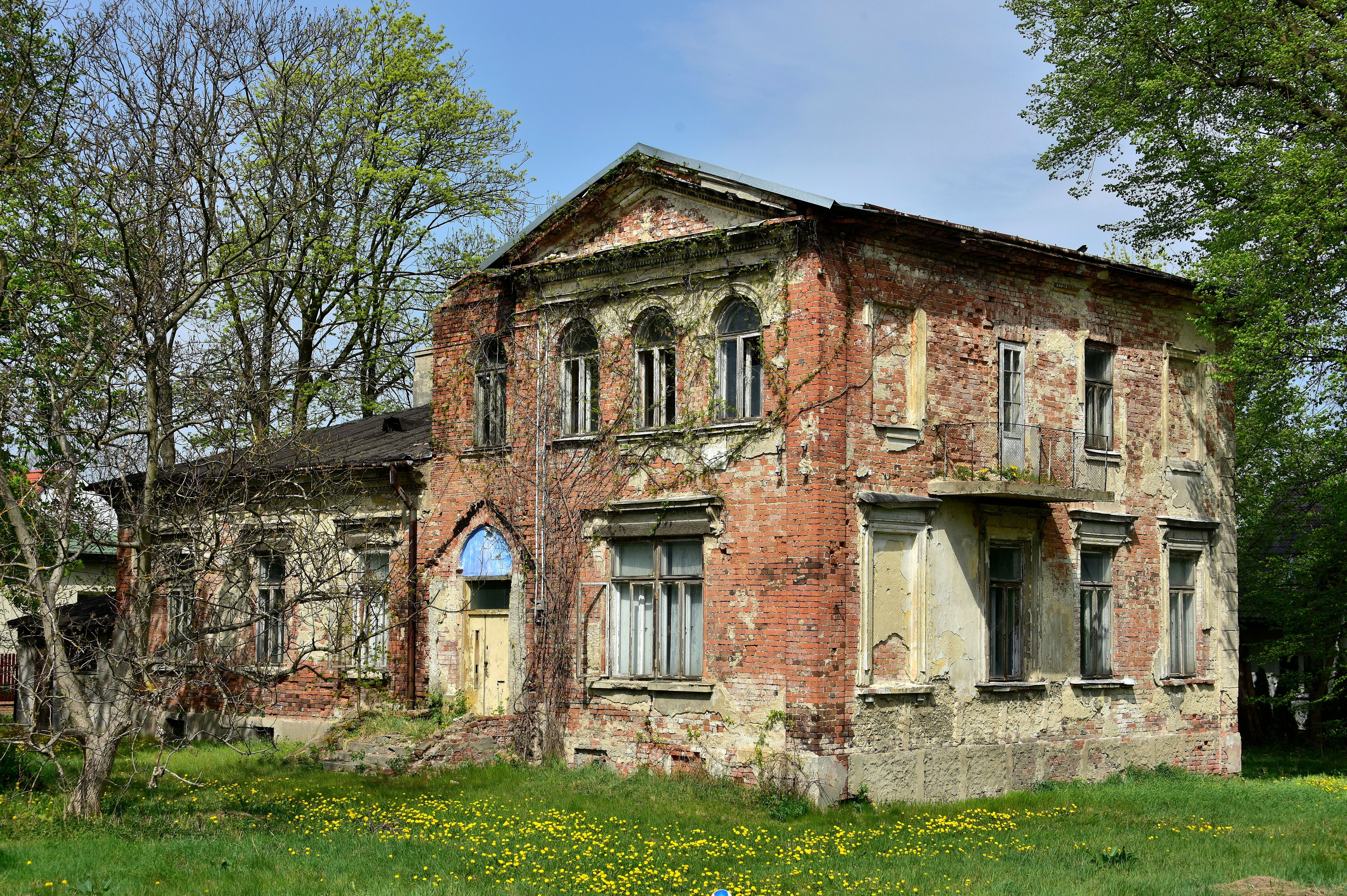
The Krasnowola Manor House built in the 19th century.

The village of Krasnowola was founded in the 19th century, to the southeast of Grabów, around the current Krasnowolska Street. In the second half of the 19th century, Krasnowola Manor House was built at the current 78 Krasnowolska Street, as the residence of castellan Kretkowski. On 8 September 1939, Krasnowola was captured by the German forces during the invasion into Poland in the Second World War. On 14 May 1951, Krasnowola was incorporated into the city of Warsaw.

== Characteristics ==
Krasnowola is located in the southwestern portion of the City Information System area of Grabów, within the Ursynów district. Its centred around Krasnowolska Street, and mostly consists of single-family detached homes, and a small portion of it also includes farmlands. The neighbourhood includes the Krasnowola Manor House, a historical residence built in the 19th century, placed at 78 Krasnowolska Street. It also has the Zabłocki Lake, located near Krasnowolska and Poloneza Streets.
