= Josefa Menéndez =

Spanish religious sister and mystic

Servant of God Josefa Menéndez SMR
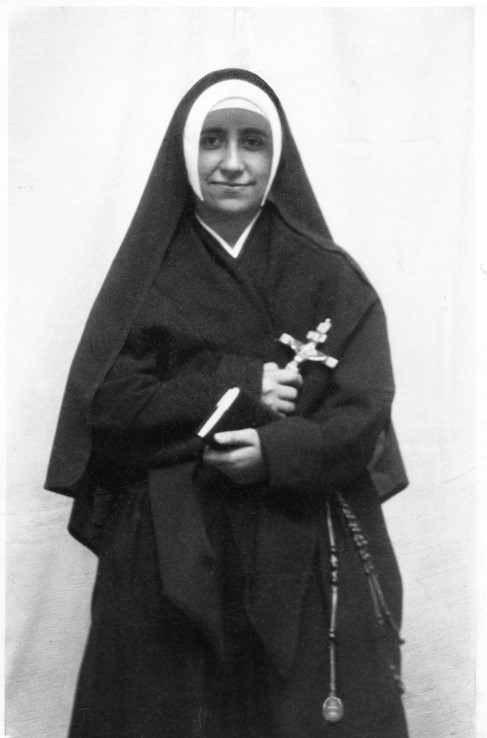
- Born: 4 February 1890
- Hometown: Madrid
- Died: 29 December 1923 (aged 33)

Josefa Menéndez (4 February 1890 – 29 December 1923) was a Spanish religious sister and mystic.

She was born to a Christian family in Madrid, and lost her father at an early age. As the oldest sister she had to work to support her family. At age 22 she joined the Sisters of Mary Reparatrix, while she continued working as a seamstress. However, the devotion to the Sacred Heart of Jesus gradually came to dominate her religious thoughts.

In 1920, at age 30, when her sister could take charge of the family Josefa left Spain and entered the Society of the Sacred Heart of Jesus in Poitiers, France. Given that she had been a seamstress before, at Poitiers she was assigned to sewing and cleaning. While in France, she reported several visions of, and messages from, Jesus. She wrote a number of detailed visions and private revelations which were later gathered and published as books.

== The writings ==
The book "Invitation to Love", a first version of the "Message from the Heart of Jesus" was published in 1938. Pope Pius XII supported the book and encouraged its diffusion. Much of Josefa's writings focus on explaining the mercifulness of the Sacred Heart of Jesus.

Menéndez' book The Way of Divine Love is an account of her life and visions. The author Stefania Macaluso stated that the writings of Menéndez are now read worldwide and are increasingly attracting interest.

Hans Urs von Balthasar wrote that in his view the contemplative life of Josefa Menendez has placed her next to saints such as Thérèse of Lisieux and Charles de Foucauld.

== Beatification process ==
The cause for Menéndez's beatification was formally opened on 26 November 1948, granting her the title of Servant of God.
