= Teresa López =

Puerto Rican photographer

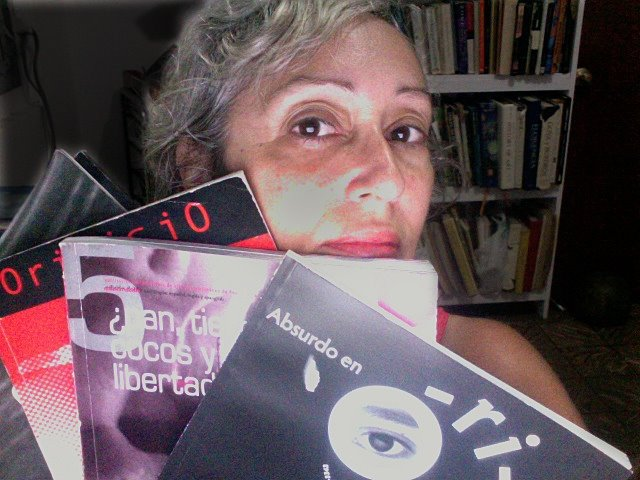
Teresa López with several Orificio editions

Teresa López (born 1957) is an artist, graphic designer and art professor. She was born in Humacao, Puerto Rico and lives in San Juan, Puerto Rico. López was the creator, graphic designer and director of Orificio, an independent art publication for contemporary Puerto Rican art. Orificio showcased the work of established and emerging contemporary artists in Puerto Rico and also functioned as an exhibition space.

== Education and early career ==
During her twenties, López took courses in photography in Sacred Heart University in Puerto Rico and several art courses at the Art Students League. During this time she also worked as a commercial photographer with José Santa Cruz and, later turning to painting, exhibited regularly in "Galería San Juan", owned by Janet D’Esopo. Starting in 1985-6 López exhibited regularly in the MSA Gallery (Movimiento Sintetista Actualizado), directed by Teo Freytes and Yrsa Davila, which eventually led to her training at the School of Fine Arts, SFA. At SFA, López studied art with Puerto Rico's top artists such as: Julio Suarez, Carlos Collazo, Domingo Garcia and many others. By 1992 she graduated from SFA with a bachelor's degree (BFA) in Painting. Moreover, López was part of the "Taller de Cayey", a collective studio which had been set up in an abandoned tobacco warehouse in Bo. Cuyones in Cayey, by Marcos Irizarry, Carlos Collazo and María de Mater O’Neill in 1988. In 1993, López, in collaboration with Dhara Rivera, Nestor Otero, Elías Adasme and others, organized Situarte93, a one-day interdisciplinary event in the Taller de Cayey that included more than fifteen artists, to mark its final closure, in memory of the recently deceased Carlos Collazo.

== Teaching ==
After graduating from SFA, López worked for several years as an Assistant Designer to the freelance designer and artist María de Mater O’Neill. Soon after, she was recruited by the SFA to teach in their newly created Image and Design Department, also becoming its second director. Together with María de Mater O”Neill, López was responsible for revising and creating the curricula for the new program in 1993. After several years teaching at SFA, she created the publication project Orificio, as a way of getting students and professors to share their artistic and intellectual interests. After leaving SFA in 2002, she decided to keep the project going, but this time as an independent art project periodical. After this, López published four more editions. Orificio #6, the last and most recent edition, was commissioned and exhibited in the Independent Publications section of the 2nda.Trienal Poli/gráfica de San Juan: América Latina y el Caribe, held in Puerto Rico in 2009. Some of the artists that collaborated in the different Orificio editions were: Charles Juhasz-Alvarado, Elizam Escobar, Maryanne Hopgood-Santaella, José Luis Vargas, Jose Jorge Román, Julio Suarez, Ana Rosa Rivera Marrero, Joaquín Mercado, Kristine Serviá, Lilliam Nieves, Carmen Olmo-Terrasa, Freddy Mercado, Carlos Fajardo, Adál Maldonado, Ernesto Pujol, Garwin Sierra and Vimarie Serrano.

== Plastic art ==
López has been active, as a plastic artist, in Puerto Rico's art scene for the last twenty years. Some of the most recent events and exhibitions in which she has participated are:

- Publica 3, 2nda.Trienal Poli/gráfica de San Juan: América Latina y el Caribe, San Juan, PR, 2009;
- Arte Nuevo Interactiva 2009, Mérida, México, Online exhibit: http://www.cartodigital.org/interactiva;
- 0508 Net Art + Net Video Colectivo, San Juan, PR., Online exhibit at www.0508dondeveoarte.com, 2008 ;
- Optika 2, Visual Narrative Simposium, Sala de exposiciones Edif. Chardón, Universidad de Puerto Rico, Recinto de Mayaguez.

Others include: Muestra Nacional Nacional de Artes Plásticas, Antiguo Asilo de Beneficiencia, Instituto de Cultura Puertorriqueña, San Juan, PR.; Tu Tran, a project of artist Charles Juhasz-Alvarado (as a collaboration), Fundación Miró, Barcelona, España and Museo de Arte de Puerto Rico, San Juan; 100 Años, 100 Artistas, Arsenal de la Puntilla, San Juan, PR.; Pequeño formato, Galería Luiggi Marrozzini, San Juan, PR.; Encuentro de Artistas Jóvenes de Puerto Rico y la República Dominicana, Casa de Teatro, Santo Domingo, RD; Retratos y Autorretratos, Galería Latinoamericana, San Juan, PR. Among special projects created by the artist there are: 23+interrogantes, online at: www.lasinterrogantes.blogspot.com and Coconututopia II, blog at: www.coconututopia.blogspot.com.
