= Peg Magoffin =

Australian chartered accountant

"Peg" Magoffin
- Born: Ann Margaret Magoffin; 14 May 1918; Echuca
- Died: 7 August 1971 (aged 53); Arcadia
- Known for: assisting Catholic organisations
- Partner: Mary Julia Susan Patterson

Ann Margaret (Peg) Magoffin (14 May 1918 – 7 August 1971) was an Australian chartered accountant. She restructured the Australian International Federation of Business and Professional Women and the Australian convents of the Society of the Sacred Heart.

== Life ==
Magoffin was born in 1918 in Echuca. Her education was occasional and interrupted because the family lived in a remote area. Her education included time at St Patrick's College, Townsville and a large contribution by the Convent of the Sacred Heart at Sydney's Rose Bay.

She joined the Institute of Chartered Accountants in Australia in 1951 after a period of evening study. In 1956 she founded her own accountancy firm, A. M. Magoffin & Co, which specialised in tax and in looking after rural customers. Magoffin formed the company after working with D. P. Dickson & Son for several years. She left with a customer base which she paid her former employers for. Magoffin was well known because she wrote every month for a business journal about taxation.

She had already written a textbook and had given lectures at the University of Sydney before the university rewarded her study with a graduate degree in economics in 1967.

Magoffin chaired the Australian International Federation of Business and Professional Women's finance committee during the 1950s and the 1960s. In 1960 the organisation was allowed to intercede in a dispute about equal pay. Magoffin prepared the submission to the Commonwealth Court of Conciliation and Arbitration. In 1966 she became the Federation's President and she restructured the national organisation into branches in each state.

The Society of the Sacred Heart who arranged her childhood education had arrived in Australia in 1882. Their management methods were French and their accounts were all kept in French. Magoffin was brought in as an advisor and she arranged for each convent to keep their own double entry accounts in English.

== Death and legacy ==
Magoffin died in 1971 in Arcadia. Her childhood school, in Rose Bay, awards a Peg Magoffin Memorial prize.
