= Otto Oppenheimer (television personality) =

Puerto Rican television personality (born 1963)

Otto Oppenheimer (born 10 February, 1965) is a Puerto Rican television personality. Oppenheimer, who dedicates himself to inform viewers about technology on television, has spent more than 40 years on Puerto Rican television. Since 2022, he has been featured on Telenoticias en Accion, a Telemundo Puerto Rico news show. He is the host of a segment named "Ottotecnologia" on that show.

== Biography ==
Oppenheimer is a native of the northwestern Puerto Rican city of Aguadilla. At the young age of 14, he became a television show host and producer, on a locally produced television musical show named "Imagen y Sonido", which was televised from Aguadilla on a television station named WOLE-TV.

A few years later, Oppenheimer went to study at the University of Puerto Rico at Mayaguez, where he intended to study engineering. But Oppenheimer soon discovered that he really enjoyed communications better, so he transferred to the Universidad del Sagrado Corazón in Santurce, a ward of San Juan, instead.

== WAPA-TV ==
During the early 1980s, Oppenheimer joined canal 4, a Puerto Rican television channel. He participated at various television shows during his 40-year tenure at Canal 4, usually presenting new technologies and technological advances to the television viewing public.

Eventually, Oppenheimer landed a spot on WAPA-TV's (by now known as "Televicentro Puerto Rico") midday variety show, "Pegate al Mediodia". This spot was named "Tecnologia con Otto".

== Telemundo Puerto Rico ==
In 2022, it was announced that Oppenheimer was moving to Televicentro's main competitor, Telemundo Puerto Rico, to participate on their news show, "Telenoticias en Accion", with a segment named "Ottotecnologia" ("Otto's Technology")

== Style ==
Oppenheimer is known for his thorough informative style making complicated concepts easy to understand to the viewer, often showing new gadgets and how technology products work on television news segments. He does so with his particular sense of humor.

== Criticism ==
On one instance during his days at Televicentro Puerto Rico, he made a joke using the name of his then co-host, the late reporter Keylla Hernandez. Hernandez showed discomfort at the joke, which was shown on Kobbo Santarrosa's gossip show, "SuperXclusivo".

== See also ==
- List of Puerto Ricans
