= Manhattanville Resolution =

1933 report regarding African American rights

The Manhattanville Resolution was one of eight reports written by religious officials and students at Manhattanville College to advocate for desegregation and the civil rights of African Americans. It was written in 1933 in Brooklyn, New York. The report connects Catholic ideals to abolitionist ideals in order to defend the human rights of African Americans.

== Resolution ==
Manhattanville College hosted a multitude of students and faculty interested in the civil rights aspects of the Catholic Church. The resolution is a series of eight written by students in 1933. The students at Manhattanville College were inspired by a man named George Hunton, the editor for the Interacial Review, a journal that focused on the Catholic opinion of interracialism.

During the 1930s, the effects of the Great Depression increased rapidly, especially for poor communities such as African American ones. The Manhattanville students wrote the 8 resolutions because of the racial violence, discrimination, and other injustices African Americans faced.

The Manhattanville students were motivated by Hunton's speech that they worked to pass the 8 resolutions to advocate for interracialism. The president of the college at the time, Grace Dammann-RSCJ, supported the interracialism of Manhattanville College and was an advocate for racial justice along with her students.

== Message of Resolution ==
The Manhattan Resolutions were adopted by college students to combat racial injustice. There are a total of eight resolutions that are declared in the resolution.

1. The first resolution declared that "the negro as a human being and as a citizen is entitled to the rights of life, liberty, and the pursuit of happiness and to the essential opportunities of life and full the full measure of social justice." The first resolution alludes to the constitution by using the phrase "right of life, liberty and the pursuit of happiness."
2. The second resolution is "to be courteous and kind to every colored person, remembering the heavy yoke of injustice and discrimination he is bearing. To remember that no race or group in America had endured that many handicaps that are his to-day."
3. The third resolution states, "to say a kind word for him on every proper occasion."
4. The fourth resolution was, "not to speak slightingly or use nicknames which tend to humiliate, off end or discourage him."
5. Number five states, "to remember that the catholic church and the catholic program of social justice has been the "greatest hope of the colored race."
6. Number six states, "to recognize that the negro shares my membership in the mystical body of Christ and the privileges that flow there from and conduct myself in accordance therewith."
7. The seventh resolution states, "to give liberally on the Sundays of the year when the collections are devoted to the heroic missionaries laboring among the Negro group."
8. The last resolution states, "to become increasingly interested in the welfare of the negro; to engage actively in some form of catholic action looking to the betterment of his condition, spiritually and materially."

== A Committee of Catholic College Graduates and Undergraduates ==
The Manhattanville Resolutions were put together by "A Committee of Catholic College Graduates and Undergraduates" and "The Interracial Committee of the Brooklyn Catholic Action Council", and the Forward was written by Francis S. Mosely.

- "The following committee is an independent group and not affiliated with any single college or university"
  - Thomas J. Masterson (chairman)
  - Alfred A. Cooper
  - Joseph G. Cox
  - Wm. Fitzgerald
  - Mary Gallagher
  - Raymond J. Goetz
  - Rita L. Honerkamp
  - Marjorie McLinden
  - Francis J. Lovelock
  - Edgar A. Martin
  - Eileen O'Mahoney
  - Agnes Toner
  - James J. Walsh

== Impact ==
The Manhattanville Resolution became the "basis for a Catholic interracial program at Catholic colleges." The resolution began a series of events leading to educational interracialism. The interracialism program for Catholic colleges around the country met many times after the resolution had been published to discuss further actions to take to desegregate schools. The Catholic colleges discussed these proposals at the many Catholic Interracial Conferences in starting in 1935.

The Manhattanville Resolution initiated the public discussion between Catholic colleges about interracialism. This impacted the civil rights movement as a whole because particular religious support for education amongst other things bolstered the argument that African Americans are deprived of basic human rights.
