= Grabówek, Warsaw =

Neighbourhood in Warsaw, Poland

Grabówek
- Neighbourhood
- Interactive map of Grabówek
- Coordinates: 52°08′26″N 21°00′49″E
- Country: Poland
- Voivodeship: Masovian
- City and county: Warsaw
- District: Ursynów
- City Information System area: Grabów
- Time zone: UTC+1 (CET)
  - Summer (DST): UTC+2 (CEST)
- Area code: +48 22

Grabówek (Polish: [ɡraˈbuv.ɛk]) is a neighbourhood in Warsaw, Poland, within the Ursynów district, in the City Information System area of Grabów. It forms a residential area with single-family housing. Grabówek was founded in the 19th century, and was incorporated into Warsaw in 1951.

== History ==
Grabówek was founded in the 19th century, as an extension of the village of Grabów, located to the later's southeast. Following the abolition of serfdom in 1864, Grabówek became part of then-established municipality of Falenty. On 14 May 1951, it was incorporated into the city of Warsaw.

== Characteristics ==
Grabówek is a small residential neighbourhood with a low-rise single family housing. It is located to the southeast of Grabów, and to the east of Krasnowola, within the southeastern portion of the City Information System area of Grabów.
