= Grace Dammann =

American educator and civil rights activist

Grace Dammann RSCJ
- Born: 1872
- Died: 1945 (aged 72–73)
- Occupation: President
- Employer: Manhattanville College
- Organization: Society of the Sacred Heart

Grace Cowardin Dammann, RSCJ (1872–1945) was a member of the Society of the Sacred Heart (RSCJ) and a president of Manhattanville College. She was a long time civil rights activist. Under her leadership, Manhattanville College admitted its first African American student in 1938. The identity of the student is unknown, although her picture ran in the Amsterdam News in the mid 1940s.

== Society of the Sacred Heart ==
Grace joined the Society of the Sacred Heart in 1898. In 1912 she became the headmistress of Convent of the Sacred Heart in Eden Hill, Pennsylvania. She was instrumental in the passage of the Manhattanville Resolution which called for Sacred Heart schools to admit African American girls. She was educated at Georgetown Visitation Academy but due to social norms of the era was unable to graduate from college.

== Leadership of Manhattanville College ==
Dammann became president of Manhattanville College in 1930. While serving as president Dammann actively recruited faculty from Europe. She was quoted as saying she wanted to make Manhattanville "the best Catholic college." She is notable for making the decision to admit an African American student in 1938. The identity of the student is unknown but it was reported at the time that she was the daughter of college educated parents. She was also noted to be a student of high scholastic achievement.

== Advocacy for racial justice ==
When Dammann announced Manhattanville would be admitting an African American student she received letters of support from alums commending her for fighting against the Jim Crow laws. It is well documented that she received numerous telegrams of support. Not everyone was supportive of her actions as many other alums wrote letters protesting her decision. One group sent a scathing letter criticizing her decision which was sent from "The Indignant Protest" and stated, "We feel disgraced, our pride is in the dust. We are forced to swallow a bitter pill and we don't like it."

In defense of her decision, Dammann delivered a powerful speech advocating for racial justice in on Class Day, May 21, 1938 titled "Principles versus Prejudices." This widely published speech encouraged other schools to admit African American students. Students voted 79.6% in favor of admitting an African American student.

In 1938 Dammann was quoted as saying, "She is not coming to college to make social contacts. Her ambitions are far wider and deeper than that. She is coming for an education that will equip her for the uplifting of her own racial group. She needs an education for leadership of her race. Manhattanville is Catholic college equipped to give it to her. Can we in conscience refuse to admit her, when all the first-class eastern colleges for women admit Negro students?" Damman argued the admittance of this student made Manhattanville an even more prestigious institution. Shortly after Dammann gave her "Principles versus Prejudices" speech Pope Pius XI announced a call for the heads of Catholic colleges and universities to speak out against racial injustice.

Dammann was a member of the NAACP as well as many other civic organizations. Her successor, Eleanor O'Byrne, was also an RSCJ who advocated for racial justice at Manhattanville. O'Byrne was photographed with a group of students affiliated with the National Federation of Catholic Students on their way to the March on Washington in 1963.

== Publications ==
In 1942 she published the article, "The American Catholic College for Women" in Essays on Catholic Education in the United States.

== Personal life ==
Grace was also frequently referred to as Mother Dammann. She was born in Baltimore and had a brother and a sister. She died of a heart attack in 1945 and her obituary appeared in the New York Times which championed her work for racial justice. An anniversary mass was held in her honor in 1946.
