= Eleanor O'Byrne =

American Catholic Nun

Mother Eleanor O'Byrne
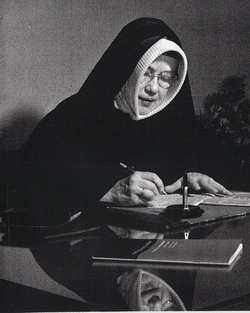
- Sister O'Byrne in her office
- Born: September 12, 1896; Savannah, Georgia
- Died: October 4, 1987 (aged 91); Albany, New York
- Occupations: Dean, President
- Title: Mother
- Predecessor: Grace Dammann, RSCJ (1930–1945)
- Successor: Elizabeth McCormack (1965–1974)

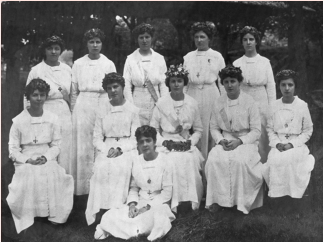
At her "Prize of Excellence" award ceremony, 1915

Mother Eleanor O'Byrne R.S.C.J. (September 12, 1896 – October 4, 1987) was a civil rights activist and the fifth president of Manhattanville College. She was best known for her efforts to reform the American educational system in order to provide equity for women and African Americans, as well as facilitating the transfer of the Manhattanville College campus from New York City to Purchase, New York. She later was president of Universidad del Sagrado Corazón.

== Early life ==
O’Byrne was born on September 12, 1896, to Marie A. O’Byrne (née McDonough) and Michael Alphonsus O’Byrne. She grew up in Savannah, Georgia, and had four siblings, all of whom died young.

The values of religion and civic engagement were instilled in her from a young age, as her father, a prominent Savannah lawyer, was a member of such organizations as the American Irish Historical Society and the Knights of Columbus, as well as vice president of the St. Vincent de Paul Society, and president of the Female Orphans Benevolent Society. The family attended services at Cathedral parish, and carried those religious beliefs into their home. Her mother was also very religious, and donated money to the Cathedral of St. John the Baptist restoration effort.

Her mother died in 1903, and her father eventually remarried to Sara Lorene Wren, who happened to be a Manhattanville alumna from the class of 1900.

== Education and early career ==
O’Byrne was first educated at the Pape School in Savannah, Georgia, and then furthered her studies at Manhattanville College. She won the ”Prize of Excellence” award at her graduation in 1915. The following year, she became a member of the Society of the Sacred Heart, and after doing her noviceship at Kenwood Convent, she took her vows on December 8, 1918. She then went on to get her master's degree from Fordham University.

She got her first job out of college as the Directress of Studies at Convent of the Sacred Heart, Overbrook, which is now known as Sacred Heart Academy Bryn Mawr, from 1924 to 1928. She was relocated to a Washington, D.C., area school within the Sacred Heart network for the 1928–1929 school year. She then got another bachelor's degree from Oxford in 1933, and was subsequently employed at Manhattanville College as a history professor for the 1933–1934 school year. She was given the post of dean of students the following school year, and remained as such until 1945. She got her second Master's degree from Oxford in 1936.

== Academia ==
O’Byrne was Manhattanville College's president from 1945 to 1966, appointed as such after the unexpected death of her predecessor, Mother Grace Damman. O'Byrne was beloved by the students, and on a first-name basis with almost all of them.

During her tenure as president, she tripled the worth of the school to $19.1 million, and increased alumni contributions from $65,000 in 1945 to $169,050 in 1965. Additionally, she doubled the amount of faculty and increased the school's enrollment from 399 students in her first year to 935 in her final.

She is most remembered for transferring the school to a new location. City College was struggling to keep up with a boom of new students in the wake of World War II, and requested permission to take over Manhattanville's campus on September 15, 1949. Manhattanville got a new piece of land, the estate of Whitelaw Reid, a diplomat, that was located in Purchase, New York. They planned and constructed the new campus in one and a half years. The old Manhattanville campus was officially absorbed by City College on October 27, 1951, by the City of New York's right of eminent domain. $8,808,620 was awarded to Manhattanville for their campus and buildings.

Under O'Byrne's leadership, the 1960s brought with it a more political student body. Students became involved in racial equality, poverty, apartheid, and substance abuse through protests and lawmaking. On August 28, 1963, she led two professors and six students from Manhattanville College to Washington, D.C., in order to participate in the March on Washington for Jobs and Freedom.

In 1962, the school finished the building that was dedicated as the O’Byrne Chapel, which was named after her. When she was questioned about the abstract nature of the chapel's stained glass windows, she retorted, “We are living in a contemporary world–not in the 13th century.”

From 1967 to 1970, O'Byrne served as president of Universidad del Sagrado Corazón.

== Advocacy work ==
O’Byrne strove to create equality in education, the workplace, and the world as a whole. She created and was a part of many organizations, like the Department of Education and New York state committees, the American Association of University Women, the College Entrance Examination Board, and White House Conference on Civil Rights, working in close proximity to political leaders like Robert F. Kennedy and Nelson Rockefeller.

She made great strides for equality on a plethora of boards and committees, however, she was most proud of her efforts to aid the African American community. In 1953, she started tried to convince the Association of American Colleges to make scholarships and fellowships open to black students. She was also a director of Catholic Scholarships for Negroes Inc., a member of the United Negro College Fund, on the advisory committee of the John La Farge Institute, and advised the National Scholarship Service and Fund for Negro Students. In 1963 she worked on an interracial justice campaign with Roy Wilkins, Executive Secretary of the NAACP.

She received many honorary degrees and awards for her efforts towards gender, racial, and educational equity. She was given honorary degrees from NYU, Fordham University, University of Notre Dame, Georgetown University, and Boston College. She was also awarded the Award of Palmes Academiques from France's government as a form of recognition for how she had contributed to education in 1966.

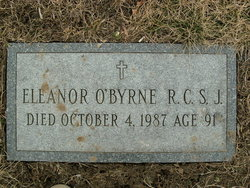
Eleanor O'Byrne's gravesite at Kenwood Convent.

== Retirement ==
When O'Byrne announced her retirement for July 1966, it was to the shock of many people in the community. Although she was in good health and not ill of mind or body, she was ready to move on. In light of this decision, she was honored in the Congressional Record by Ogden R. Reid of New York as “One of the ablest, most creative and thoughtful leaders of higher education in America.”

Although she was no longer Manhattanville's president, she did not cease her advocacy work, nor did she lose her sense of humor. She said herself that “I won’t be knitting by the fireplace” in her retirement. She continued to serve on New York Governor Nelson A. Rockefeller's Commission on the Education and Employment of Women from 1963 to 1970, after which she began a more isolated retirement at Kenwood Convent, during which she worked on a classified educational project. She died there of an illness on October 4, 1987, at the age of 91. She was buried at Kenwood Cemetery in Albany, New York.
