= Society of the Sacred Heart =

Religious congregation for women of the Catholic Church

Society of the Sacred Heart of Jesus
- Religiosae Sanctissimi Cordis Jesu
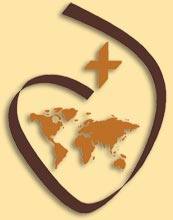
- Abbreviation: Post-nominal letters: RSCJ
- Formation: November 21, 1800; 225 years ago
- Founder: Madeleine Sophie Barat
- Founded at: Amiens, France
- Type: Centralized Religious Institute of Consecrated Life of Pontifical Right for women
- Coordinates: 41°54′4.9″N 12°27′38.2″E
- Members: 1,400+ members as of 2024
- Motto: Latin: Cor Unum et Anima Una in Corde Jesu; English: One Heart and One Soul in the Heart of Jesus
- Superior General: Sister Barbara Dawson, RSCJ
- Generalate: Casa Generalizia; Via Tarquinio Vipera, 16 Roma, Italia
- Ministry: educational work
- Parent organization: Catholic Church
- Website: rscjinternational.org

The Society of the Sacred Heart of Jesus (French: Religieuses du Sacré-Cœur de Jésus; Latin: Religiosae Sanctissimi Cordis Jesu), abbreviated RSCJ, is a Catholic centralized religious institute of consecrated life of pontifical right for women established in France by Madeleine Sophie Barat in 1800.

== History ==
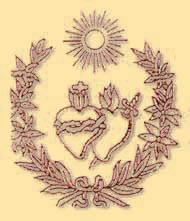
Original emblem of the Society of the Sacred Heart

Madeleine Sophie Barat founded the Society of the Sacred Heart of Jesus in the wake of the French Revolution to provide educational opportunities for girls. The manner of life was to be simple without the prescribed austerities of the older orders, which would be incompatible with the work of education. In some houses the religious conducted just one school, but in several places, especially in the larger houses in cities there were at least two schools, a boarding school and a school for poor children. The first convent was opened at Amiens in 1801. In 1820 the French Government gave a run down property now known as Hotel Biron (current Rodin Museum) to the Society. Other houses were opened in Grenoble, Niort, Poitiers and Cuigniers. In 1826 the society obtained the formal approbation of Pope Leo XII and the first cardinal protector was appointed. Barat remained superior general of the Society from 1806 until her death in 1865. The Society of the Sacred Heart quickly expanded within Europe and beyond.

=== United States ===
In 1818 Rose Philippine Duchesne first brought the Society to the Americas, establishing the first free school west of the Mississippi in St. Charles, Missouri. The Society opened institutions of higher education for women in Cincinnati; Grand Coteau, Louisiana; Lake Forest, Illinois; New York; Torresdale (a suburb of Philadelphia), Pennsylvania; San Diego; Omaha; St. Louis; San Francisco; Seattle and Newton, Massachusetts.

==== Reparations for slavery in the United States ====
Along with bishops, priests, the Jesuits and most of the families of their students, the communities of the Religious of the Sacred Heart, from the time of Philippine until the Civil War, owned, bought and sold enslaved persons in the slave states of Missouri and Louisiana. Enslaved persons built the buildings, made the bricks and sustained the foundations. They worked side by side with the sisters, taking care of the children, cooking, washing and gardening. ... It is known that the Society of the Sacred Heart of Jesus had enslaved persons in Grand Coteau, Louisiana; Convent, Louisiana; Natchitoches, Louisiana; and St. Louis and Florissant, Missouri."

In September 2018, the Academy of the Sacred Heart in Grand Coteau dedicated "a monument in the parish cemetery naming the enslaved persons of the convent known to be buried there. The museum at the school will have an area dedicated to the convent’s history and acknowledgment of its role in slavery. The names of all known enslaved persons will be part of this area of the museum. A plaque will be placed at the slave quarters naming those living there in its first years." "The Society of the Sacred Heart announced the creation of the Cor Unum Scholarship to provide tuition assistance to African American students desiring a Sacred Heart education at Schools of the Sacred Heart – Grand Coteau in Grand Coteau, Louisiana, and to provide professional development for faculty and staff and/or course curriculum to students on inclusion and diversity."

=== England and Wales ===
The Society came to England in 1842, founding a girl's boarding school at Elm Grove in Roehampton. That school evolved into a teacher training school Digby Stuart College. The Sisters have been involved in education ever since, and founded schools around the country. Most are no longer directly run by the order but are under its trusteeship or the diocese. In 1975 Digby Stuart College joined with three other local colleges to become what is today the University of Roehampton. The RSCJ Sisters are active members of the university governing body.

The England and Wales province is largely centered in Roehampton where it maintains two houses. The Barat House community consists of a group of RSCJ sisters and university students who live in the community house in the grounds of Digby Stuart College. The Duchesne House is also a registered care house for elderly sisters. Its community plays an active role in the pastoral care of pupils at the nearby Sacred Heart Primary School.

=== New Zealand ===
The first RSCJ arrived in New Zealand in 1880. In 1909 RSCJ established a Catholic girls school, Baradene College of the Sacred Heart in Remuera, Auckland, New Zealand. Sr. Philomene (Phil) Tiernan, RSCJ of the Australis/New Zealand Province was among the passengers of Malaysia Airlines flight MH17 shot down over Ukraine in 2014.

Between 1906 and 1909, the French government forced the closing of forty-seven houses of the Society in that country, and 2500 religious were dispersed to other countries. The motherhouse was relocated to Ixelles, Belgium. The rule of cloister was removed at the General Chapter of 1964.

=== Australia ===
In 1882, five nuns of the Sacred Heart arrived in Sydney to found a school which they did at Rose Bay.

The Society of the Sacred Heart was still active in Australia in the twentieth century. For many years their management was unusual because of its methods and the accounts were all kept in French. Ann Margaret Magoffin was brought in as an advisor and she allowed each convent to keep their own double entry accounts, but in English.

=== Uganda ===
The first foundation in Uganda was established by six RSCJ in 1962. In 1984 RSCJ took over management of the St. Charles Lwanga Girls' Training Centre, in Kalungu, founded in 1967 by Fr. Emiliano La Croix of the Missionaries of Africa.

== Constitution ==
The Society's Constitution of 1982 links the ministry undertaken by its members with their calling to be "caught up ... in the desires of the heart of Jesus" and the Gospel, the "starting point" for that ministry.

== Ministry ==
As of 2023 more than 1,800 religious serve in 41 countries around the world. Members do many works, but focus on education, particularly girls' education. There are about 75 RSCJ in the Province of England and Wales. Since 1979, members of the Llannerchwen Community have operated a retreat centre near Brecon, Wales. Some sisters are also involved in individual ministries in Fenham, Newcastle.

In Uganda and Kenya, sisters are involved in teaching from primary level to University level, in counseling, pastoral work, development of village women, work in prisons, health care, AIDS education, home-based care of those with AIDS and a home for children with disabilities.

The Association Mondiale des Anciennes et Anciens du Sacré-Coeur (AMASC) is a worldwide organization of alumnae and alumni of Sacred Heart schools established in 1960 to cooperate effectively with the Society of the Sacred Heart in its mission and ministries. One of its projects is providing support for the Sacred Heart School at Kyamusansala Hill, Uganda. Support included the construction of a residential school which as of 2015 provided education for 530 girls.

The society holds NGO status at the UN as a special consultant with the Economic and Social Council.

== Notable members ==
- Madeleine Sophie Barat
- Karuna Mary Braganza
- Mary T. Clark
- Grace Dammann
- Rose Philippine Duchesne
- Yelizaveta Golitsyna
- Mary Aloysia Hardey
- Margaret MacRory, created a women's college in Sydney
- Josefa Menéndez
- Anne Montgomery
- Eleanor O'Byrne
- Harriet Padberg
- Janet Erskine Stuart, fifth Superior General of the Society of the Sacred Heart, author of The Education of Catholic Girls
- Isa Vermehren

== See also ==
- Schools of the Sacred Heart
