= Czachówek Południowy railway station =

Railway station in Gabryelin, Poland

Czachówek Południowy
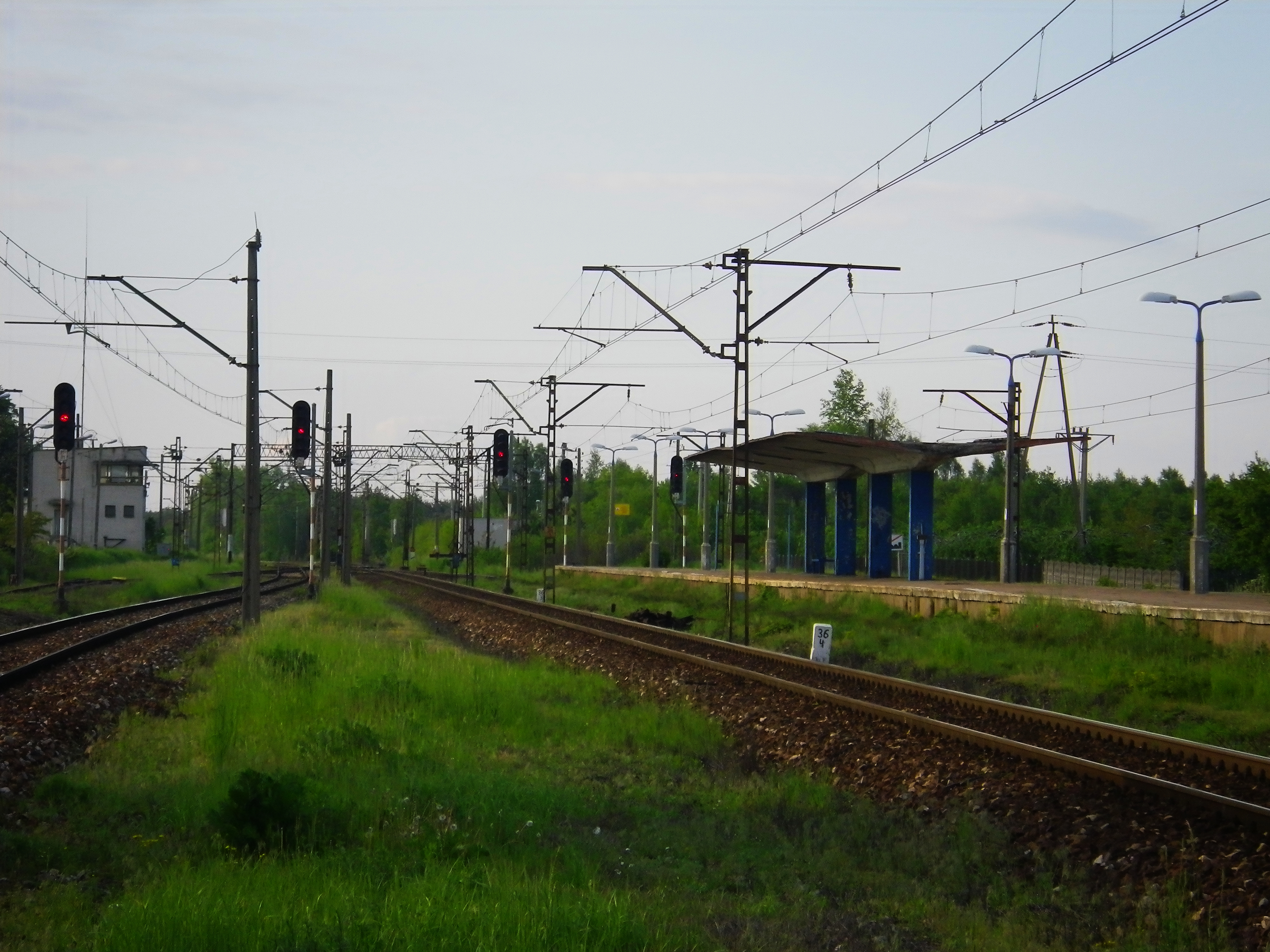

General information
- Location: Czachówek, Góra Kalwaria, Piaseczno, Masovian; Poland
- Coordinates: 51.9680874°N 21.07769°E
- System: Rail Station
- Owner: Polskie Koleje Państwowe S.A.

Services
Preceding station	Masovian Railways	Following station
Sułkowice towards Skarżysko-Kamienna	R8	Czachówek Górny towards Warszawa Wschodnia
Czachówek Wschodni towards Góra Kalwaria	R8	Czachówek Górny towards Warszawa Wschodnia
Chynów towards Skarżysko-Kamienna	RE8 Trains No. 12690/12691	Zalesie Górne towards Warszawa Wschodnia
Sułkowice towards Radom	RE8 Trains No. 12680/12681	Zalesie Górne towards Warszawa Wschodnia
Location

Czachówek Południowy railway station is a railway station at Czachówek, Piaseczno, Masovian, Poland. It is served by Masovian Railways.
