= Zalesie Górne railway station =

Railway station in Zalesie Górne, Poland

Zalesie Górne
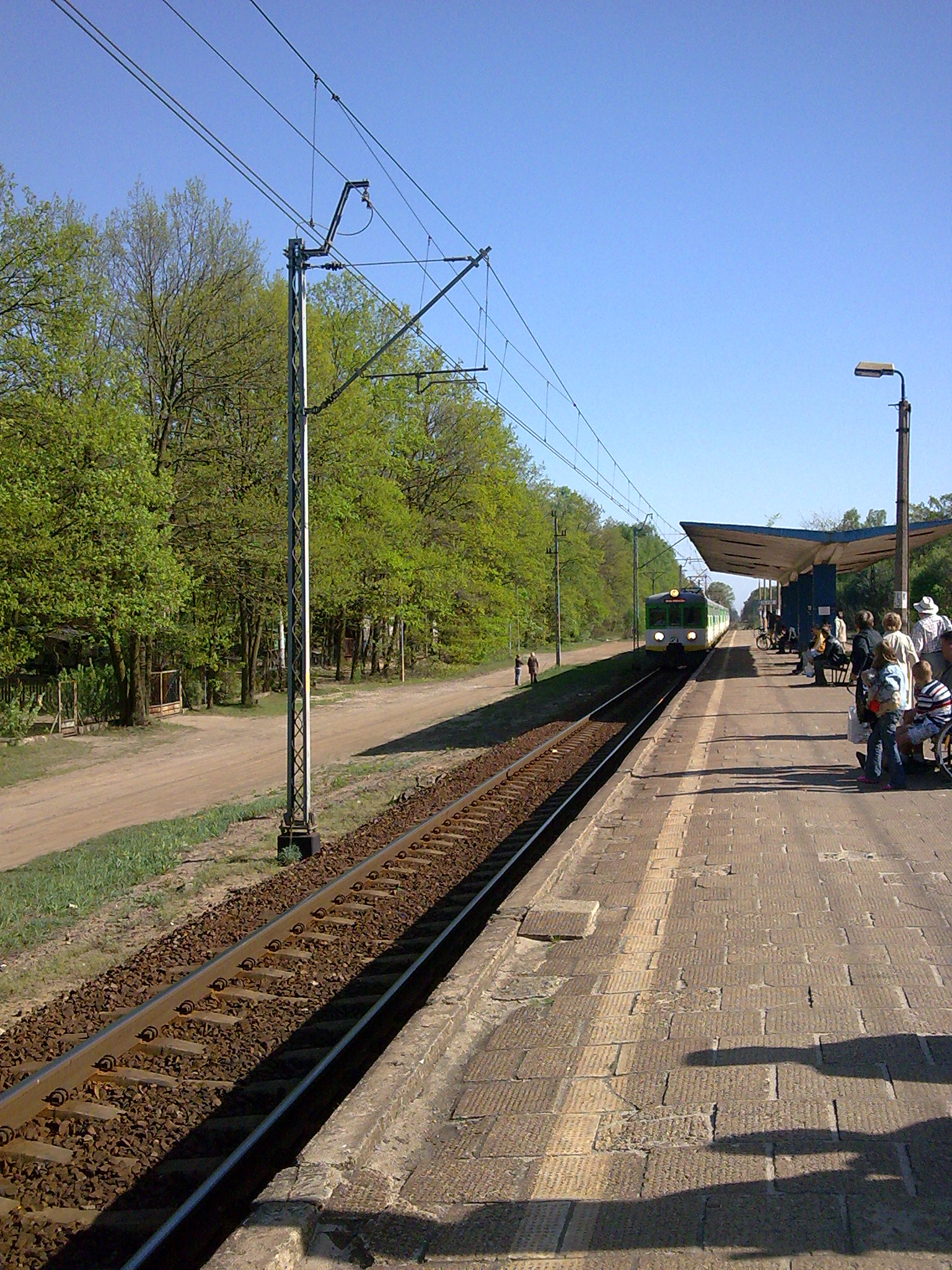

General information
- Location: Zalesie Górne, Piaseczno, Piaseczno, Masovian; Poland
- Coordinates: 52.0266729°N 21.0418291°E
- System: Rail Station
- Owner: Polskie Koleje Państwowe S.A.

Services
Preceding station	Masovian Railways	Following station
Ustanówek towards Góra Kalwaria or Skarżysko-Kamienna	R8	Piaseczno towards Warszawa Wschodnia
Czachówek Południowy towards Skarżysko-Kamienna	RE8 Trains No. 12690/12691	Piaseczno towards Warszawa Wschodnia
Czachówek Południowy towards Radom	RE8 Trains No. 12680/12681	Piaseczno towards Warszawa Wschodnia
Location

Zalesie Górne railway station is a railway station at Zalesie Górne, Piaseczno, Masovian, Poland. It is served by Masovian Railways.
