= Warszawa Jeziorki railway station =

Railway station in Warsaw, Poland

Warszawa Jeziorki
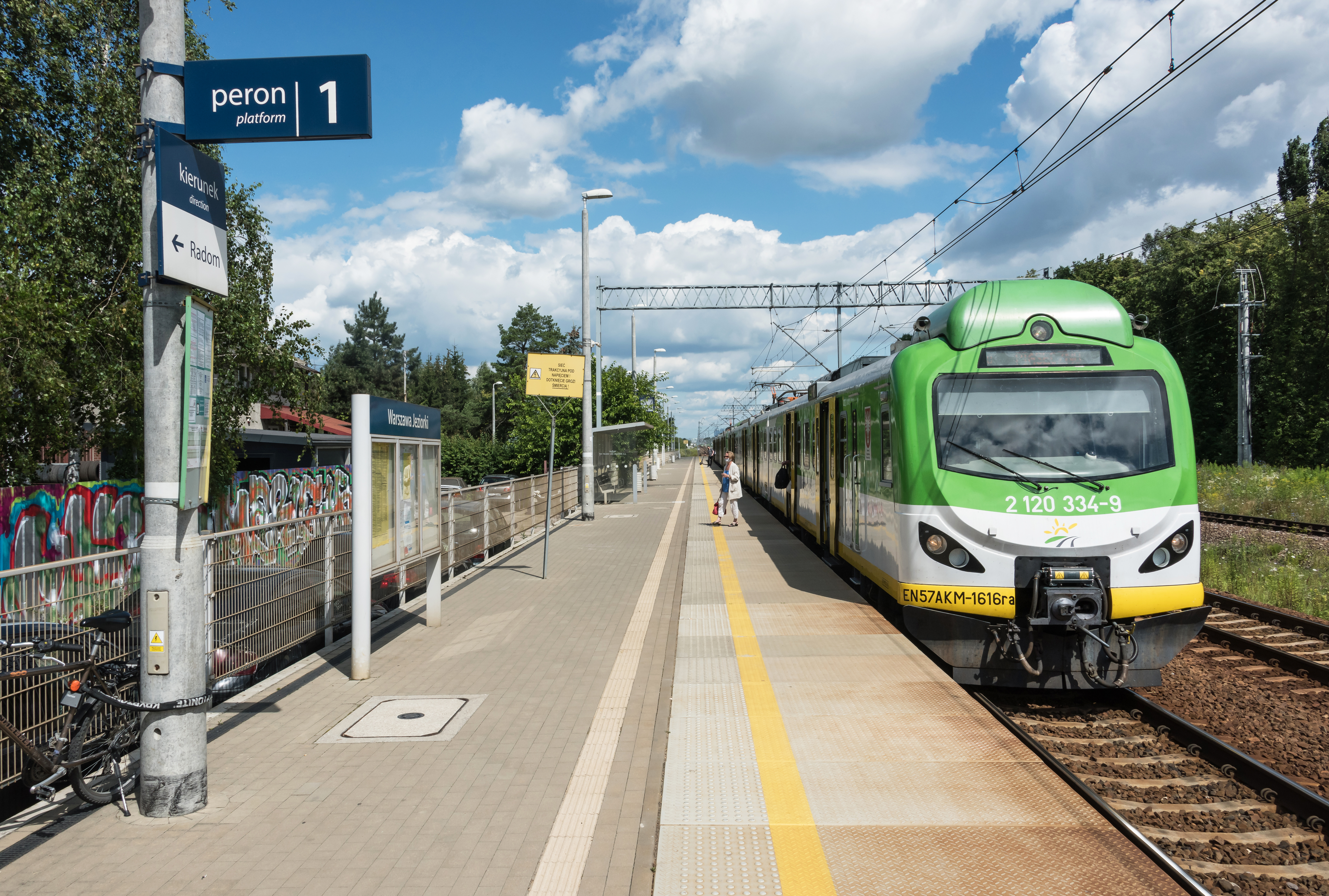

General information
- Location: Ursynów, Warsaw, Masovian; Poland
- Coordinates: 52°06′34″N 20°59′36″E
- Owner: Polskie Koleje Państwowe S.A.
- Platforms: 1
- Tracks: 2

Construction
- Structure type: Building: No

Services
Preceding station	Masovian Railways	Following station
Nowa Iwiczna towards Góra Kalwaria or Skarżysko-Kamienna	R8	Warszawa Dawidy towards Warszawa Wschodnia
Nowa Iwiczna towards Skarżysko-Kamienna	RE8 Trains No. 12690/12691	Warszawa Dawidy towards Warszawa Wschodnia
Nowa Iwiczna towards Radom	RE8 Trains No. 12680/12681	Warszawa Służewiec towards Warszawa Wschodnia
Preceding station	SKM Warsaw	Following station
Nowa Iwiczna towards Piaseczno	S4	Warszawa Dawidy towards Zegrze Południowe
Nowa Iwiczna towards Piaseczno	S40	Warszawa Dawidy towards Warszawa Rakowiec
Location

Warszawa Jeziorki railway station is a railway station in the Ursynów district of Warsaw, Poland. It is served by Masovian Railways, who run services from Warszawa Wschodnia to Góra Kalwaria and Skarżysko-Kamienna.
