= Nowa Iwiczna railway station =

Railway station in Nowa Iwiczna, Poland

Nowa Iwiczna
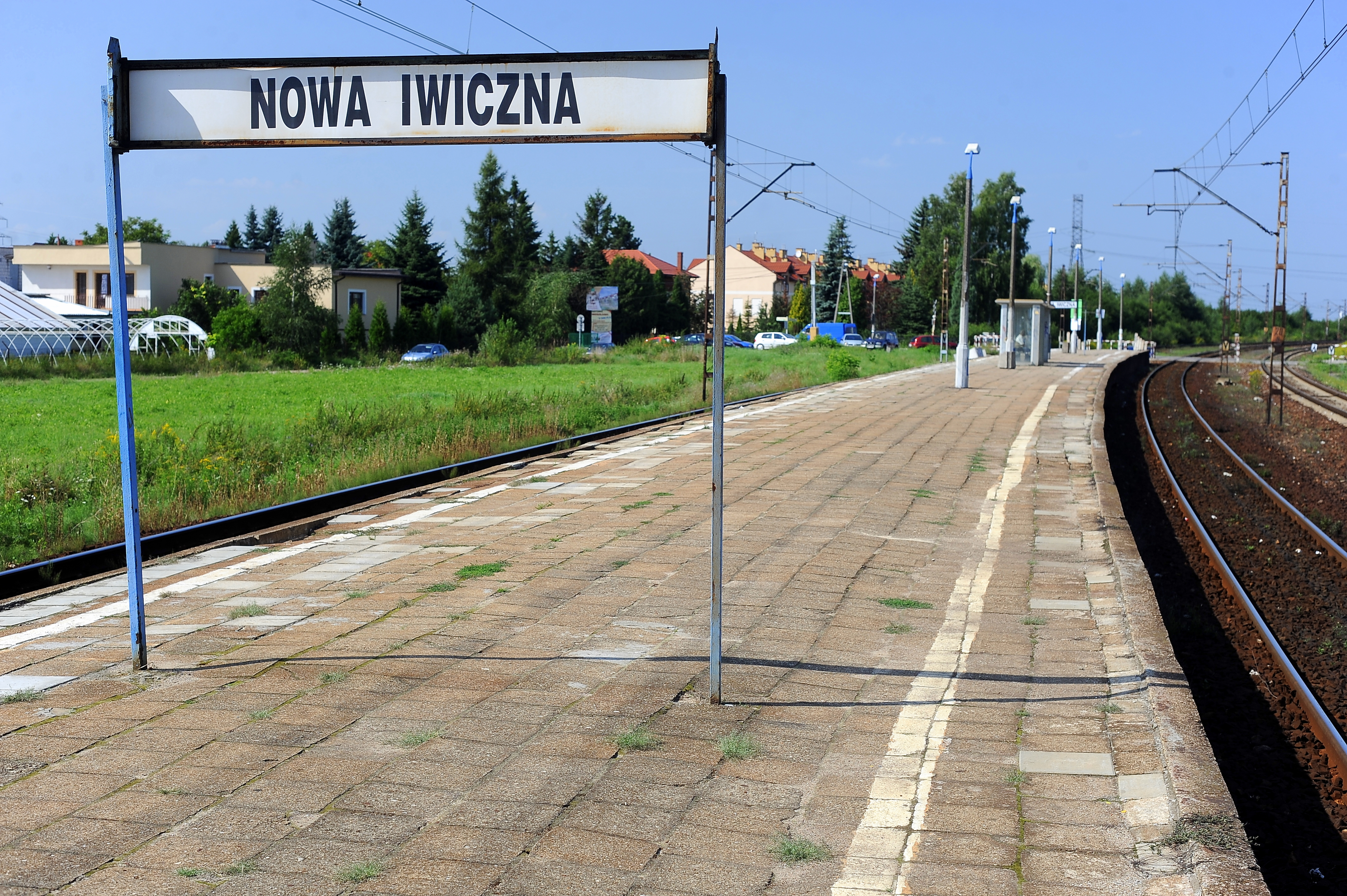

General information
- Location: Nowa Iwiczna, Lesznowola, Piaseczno, Masovian; Poland
- Coordinates: 52.0893752°N 20.9965266°E
- System: Rail Station
- Owner: Polskie Koleje Państwowe S.A.

Services
Preceding station	Masovian Railways	Following station
Piaseczno towards Góra Kalwaria or Skarżysko-Kamienna	R8	Warszawa Jeziorki towards Warszawa Wschodnia
Piaseczno towards Skarżysko-Kamienna	RE8 Trains No. 12690/12691	Warszawa Jeziorki towards Warszawa Wschodnia
Piaseczno towards Radom	RE8 Trains No. 12680/12681	Warszawa Jeziorki towards Warszawa Wschodnia
Preceding station	SKM Warsaw	Following station
Piaseczno Terminus	S4	Warszawa Jeziorki towards Zegrze Południowe
Piaseczno Terminus	S40	Warszawa Jeziorki towards Warszawa Rakowiec
Location

Nowa Iwiczna railway station is a railway station at Nowa Iwiczna, Piaseczno, Masovian, Poland. It is served by Masovian Railways.
