= Sułkowice railway station =

Railway station in Masovian Voivodeship, Poland

Sułkowice
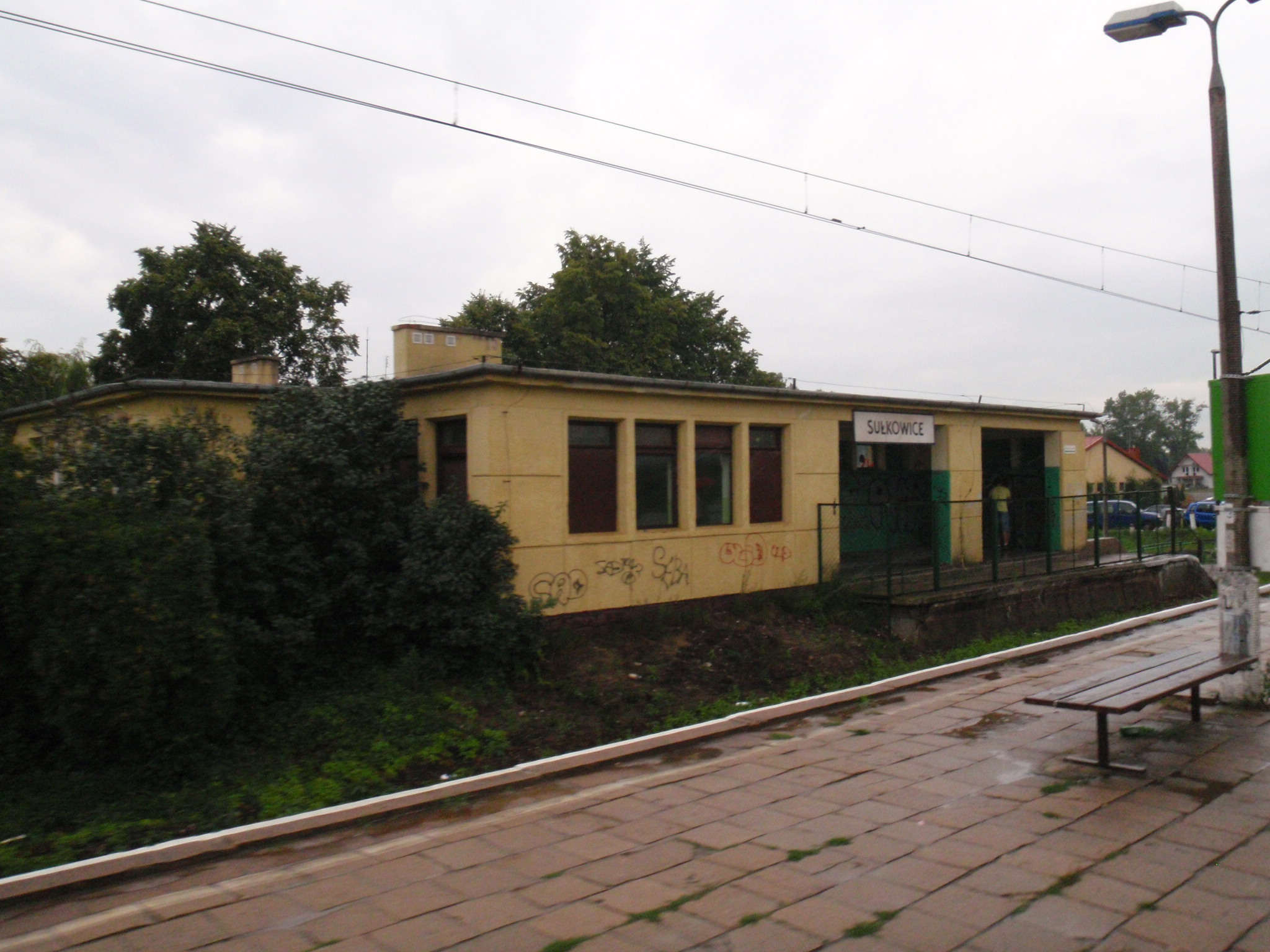

General information
- Location: Sułkowice, Chynów, Grójec, Masovian; Poland
- Coordinates: 51.9256087°N 21.0926272°E
- System: Rail Station
- Owner: Polskie Koleje Państwowe S.A.

Services
Preceding station	Masovian Railways	Following station
Chynów towards Skarżysko-Kamienna	R8	Czachówek Południowy towards Warszawa Wschodnia
Chynów towards Radom	RE8 Trains No. 12680/12681	Czachówek Południowy towards Warszawa Wschodnia
Location

Sułkowice railway station is a railway station at Sułkowice, Grójec, Masovian, Poland. It is served by Masovian Railways.
