= Warszawa Okęcie railway station =

Railway station in Warsaw, Poland

Warszawa Okęcie
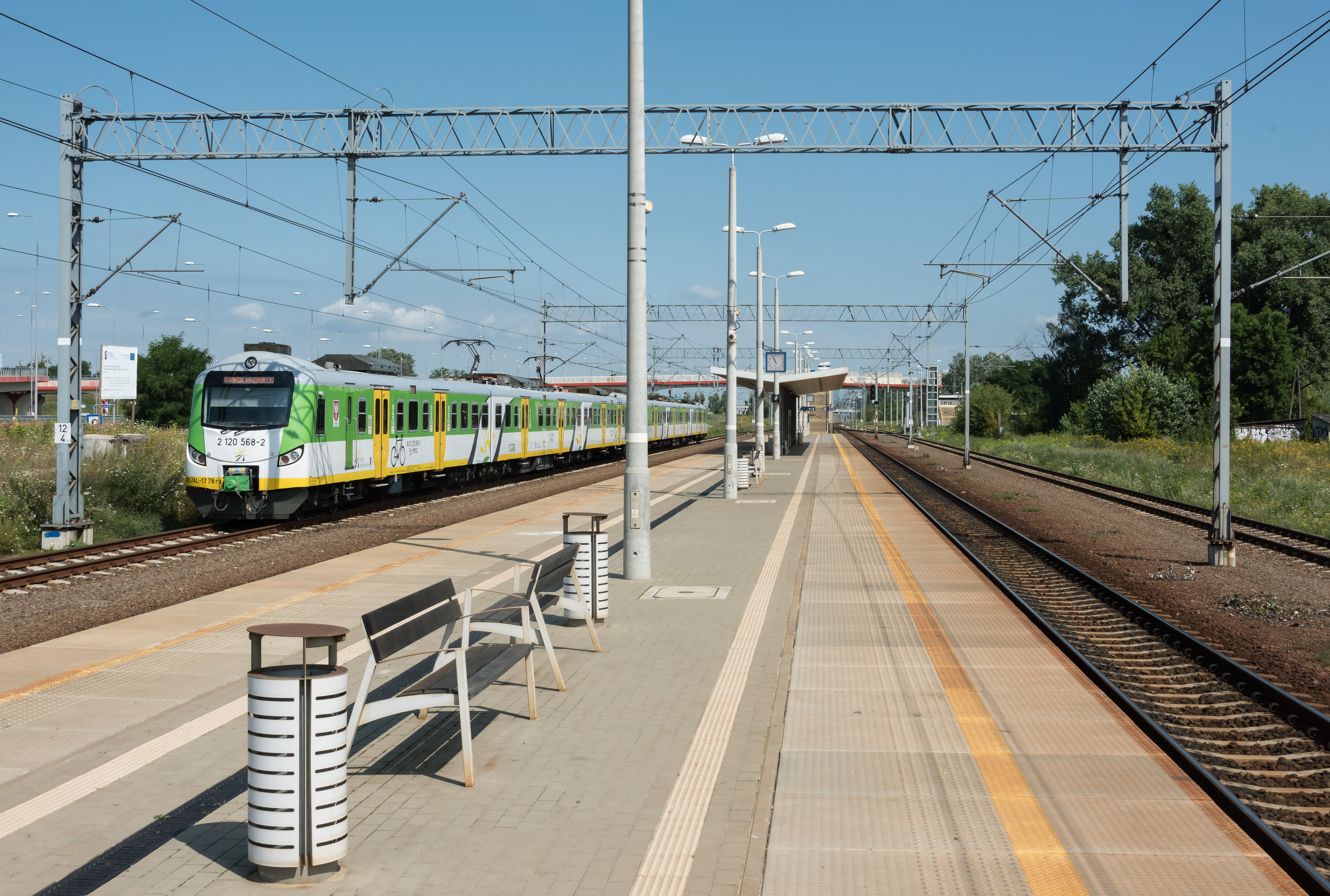
- Warszawa Okęcie station in 2020

General information
- Location: Ursynów, Warsaw, Masovian; Poland
- Coordinates: 52°10′01″N 20°59′15″E
- Owner: Polskie Koleje Państwowe S.A.
- Platforms: 1
- Tracks: 2

Construction
- Structure type: Building: No

Services
Preceding station	Masovian Railways	Following station
Warszawa Dawidy towards Góra Kalwaria or Skarżysko-Kamienna	R8	Warszawa Służewiec towards Warszawa Wschodnia
Warszawa Dawidy towards Skarżysko-Kamienna	RE8 Trains No. 12690/12691	Warszawa Służewiec towards Warszawa Wschodnia
Preceding station	SKM Warsaw	Following station
Warszawa Dawidy towards Piaseczno	S4	Warszawa Służewiec towards Zegrze Południowe
Warszawa Dawidy towards Piaseczno	S40	Warszawa Służewiec towards Warszawa Rakowiec
Location

Warszawa Okęcie railway station is a railway station in the Ursynów district of Warsaw, Poland. It is served by Masovian Railways, which runs services from Warszawa Wschodnia to Góra Kalwaria and Skarżysko-Kamienna.

There is also an unelectrified single track spur line branch (PKP rail line 937) linking the station to the Kabaty Depot of Warsaw Metro and the Siekierki Power Station.
