= Warszawa Dawidy railway station =

Railway station in Warsaw, Poland

Warszawa Dawidy
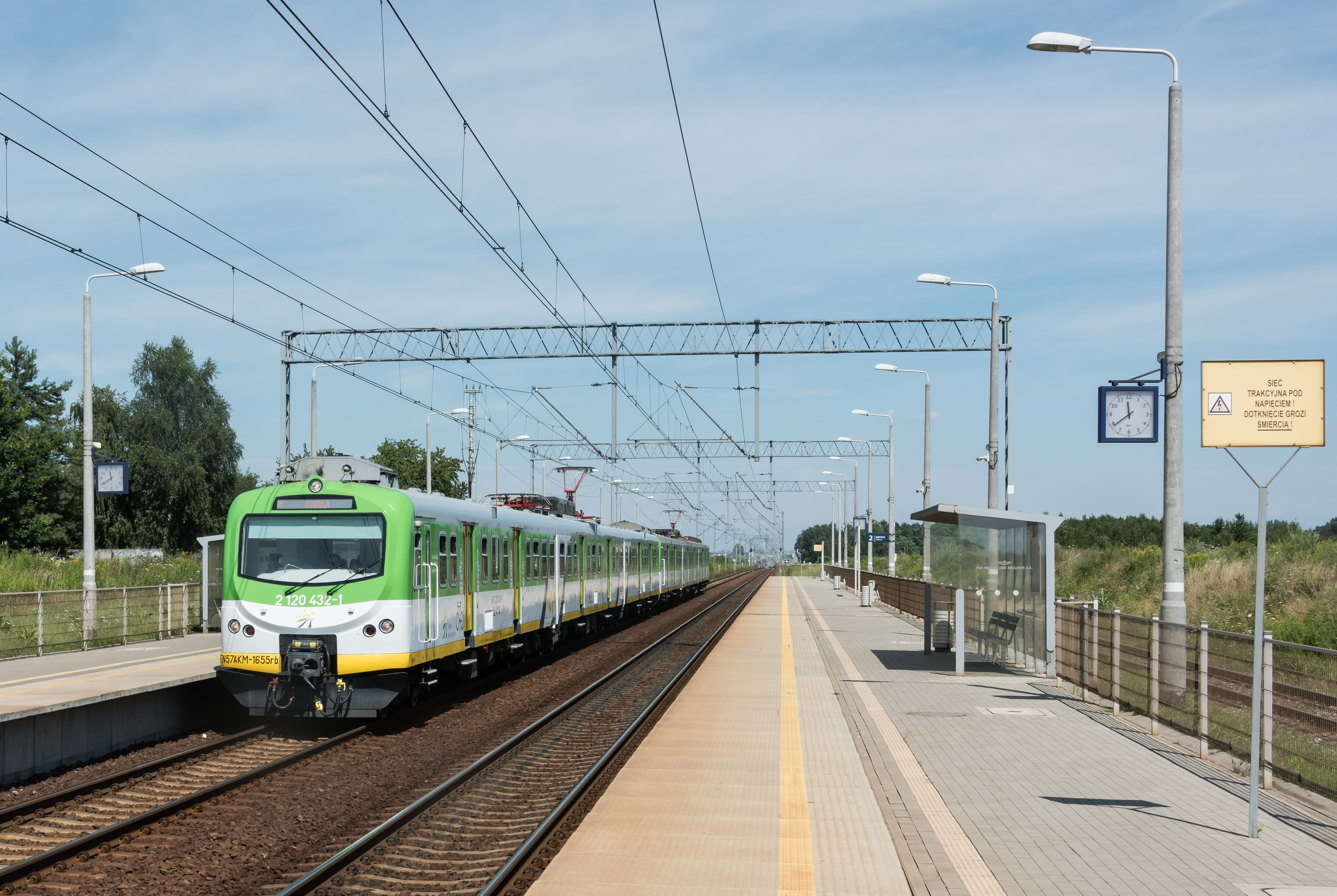
- Warszawa Dawidy in 2020

General information
- Location: Ursynów, Warsaw, Masovian; Poland
- Coordinates: 52°07′43″N 20°59′28″E
- Owner: Polskie Koleje Państwowe S.A.
- Platforms: 1
- Tracks: 2

Construction
- Structure type: Building: No

Services
| Preceding station | Masovian Railways | Following station |
|---|---|---|
| Warszawa Jeziorki towards Góra Kalwaria or Skarżysko-Kamienna | R8 | Warszawa Okęcie towards Warszawa Wschodnia |
| Warszawa Jeziorki towards Skarżysko-Kamienna | RE8 Trains No. 12690/12691 | Warszawa Okęcie towards Warszawa Wschodnia |
| Preceding station | SKM Warsaw | Following station |
| Warszawa Jeziorki towards Piaseczno | S4 | Warszawa Okęcie towards Zegrze Południowe |
| Warszawa Jeziorki towards Piaseczno | S40 | Warszawa Okęcie towards Warszawa Rakowiec |
Location

Warszawa Dawidy railway station is a railway station in the Ursynów district of Warsaw, Poland. It is served by Masovian Railways, which runs services from Warszawa Wschodnia to Góra Kalwaria and Skarżysko-Kamienna.
