= Czachówek Górny railway station =

Railway station in Piaseczno County, Poland

Czachówek Górny
- Platforms in April 2019

General information
- Location: Czachówek, Góra Kalwaria, Piaseczno, Masovian; Poland
- Coordinates: 51.9680874°N 21.07769°E
- System: Rail Station
- Owner: Polskie Koleje Państwowe S.A.

Services
Preceding station	Masovian Railways	Following station
Czachówek Południowy towards Góra Kalwaria or Skarżysko-Kamienna	R8	Ustanówek towards Warszawa Wschodnia
Location

Czachówek Górny railway station is a railway station at Czachówek, Piaseczno, Masovian, Poland. It is served by Masovian Railways.
