= Ustanówek railway station =

Railway station in Masovian Voivodeship, Poland

Ustanówek
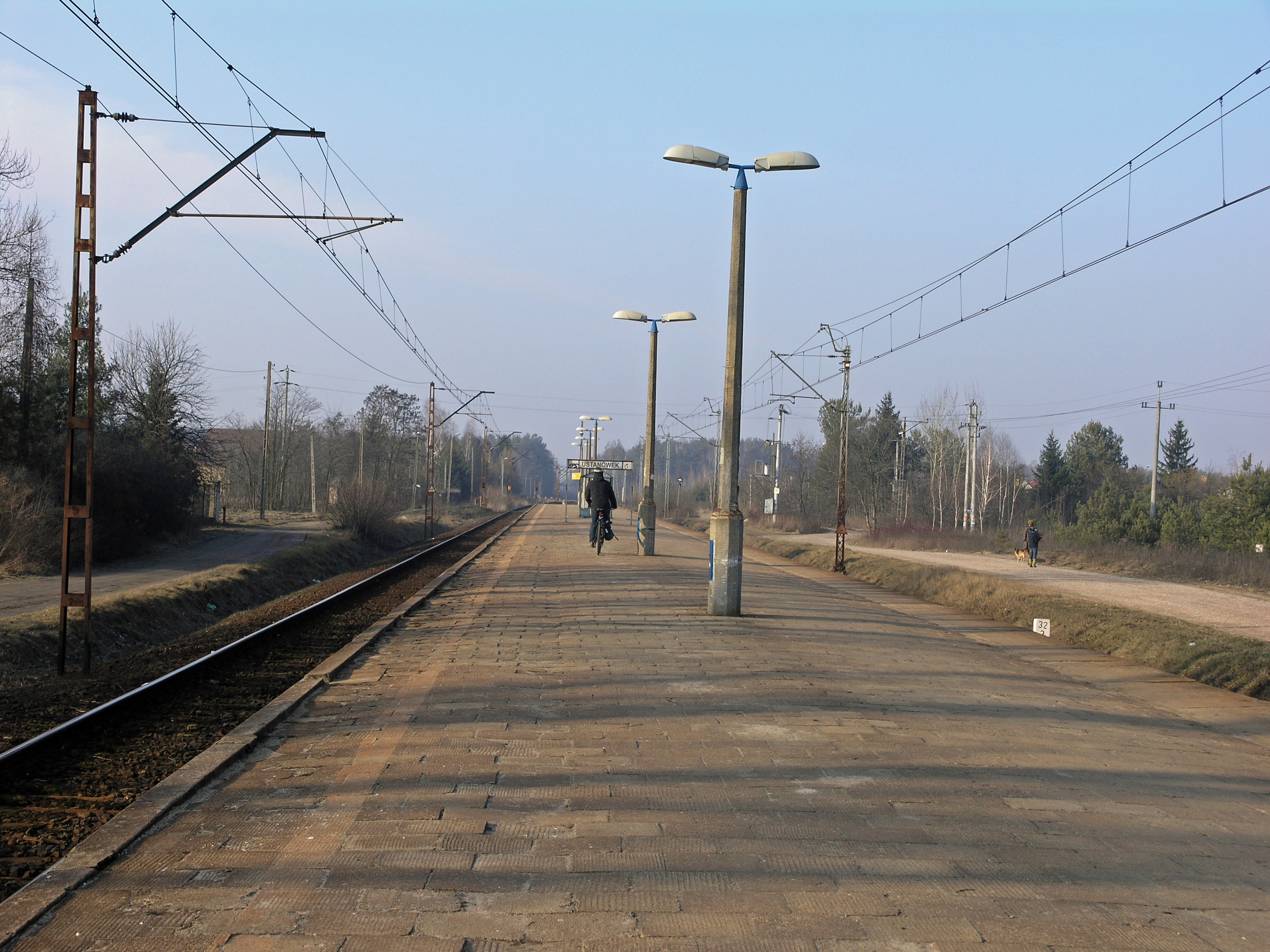

General information
- Location: Jeziórko, Prażmów, Piaseczno, Masovian; Poland
- Coordinates: 51.9956538°N 21.0606797°E
- System: Rail Station
- Owner: Polskie Koleje Państwowe S.A.

Services
Preceding station	Masovian Railways	Following station
Czachówek Górny towards Góra Kalwaria or Skarżysko-Kamienna	R8	Zalesie Górne towards Warszawa Wschodnia
Location

Ustanówek railway station is a railway station at Jeziórko, Piaseczno, Masovian, Poland. It is served by Masovian Railways.
