= Sokolniki Suche train collision =

2026 level crossing collision in Poland

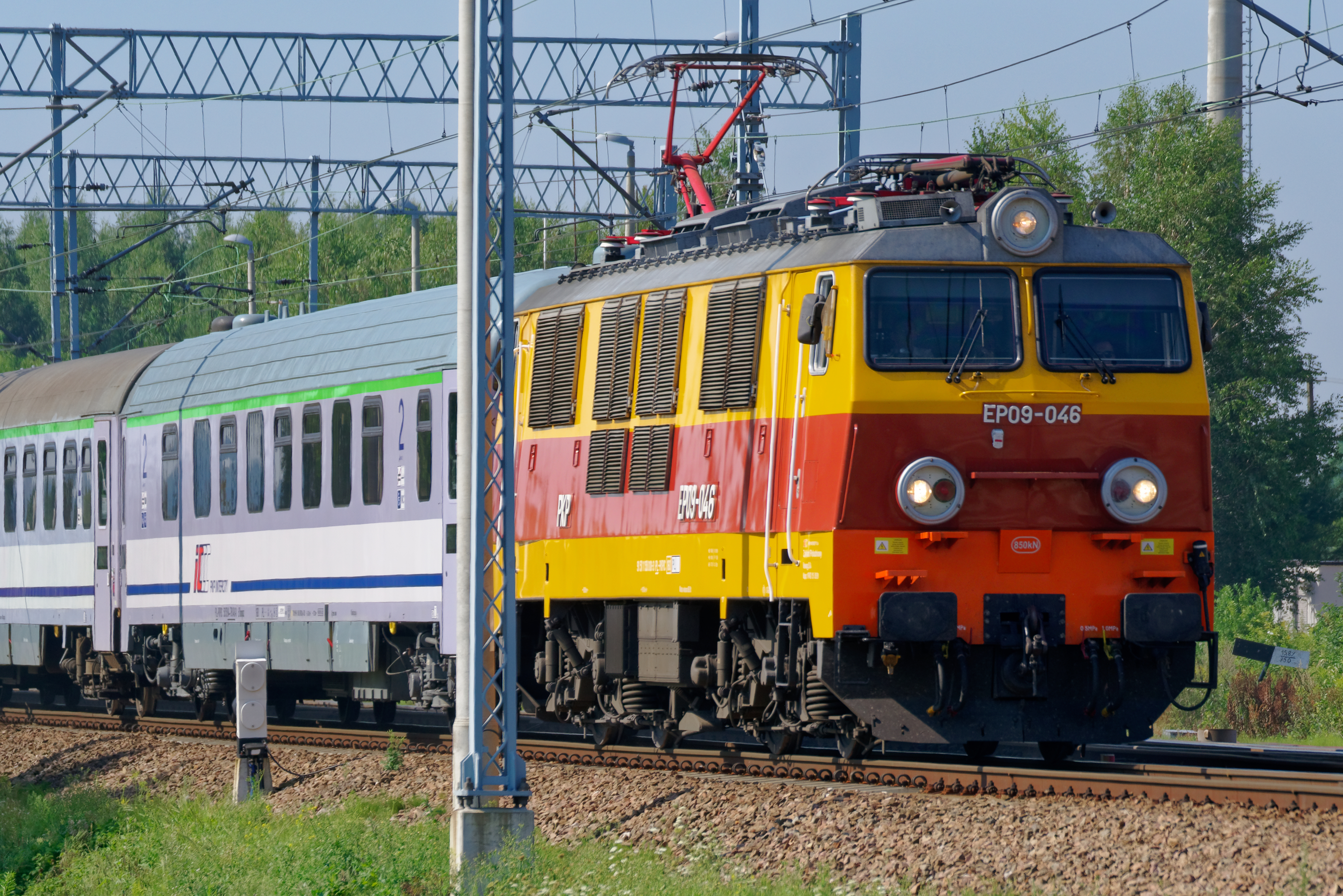
- Class EP09-046, the train involved, pictured prior to the accident in August 2020
- Approximate location of the collision

Details
- Date: 9 September 2026; 11:25 (CEST)
- Location: Sokolniki Suche, Masovian Voivodeship
- Coordinates: 51.36333°N 20.75678°E
- Country: Poland
- Line: Tomaszów Mazowiecki–Radom
- Operator: PKP Intercity
- Service: 2820/1 "Koziołek" Lublin Główny to Szczecin Główny
- Incident type: Level crossing collision, derailment
- Cause: Under investigation

Statistics
- Trains: 1
- Vehicles: Class EP09-046, hauling six carriages
- Passengers: 111
- Crew: 3
- Deaths: 2 (Note: The driver of the lorry involved, who died from complications of his injuries on 15 October 2026 was officially declared a fatality in the collision on 21 October.)
- Injured: 20 (4 seriously)
- Damage: 3 million PLN (estimated)

At 11:25 CEST on 9 September 2026, a PKP Intercity train derailed after it had collided into the side of a cement mixer lorry at a level crossing on the Tomaszów Mazowiecki–Radom railway in Sokolniki Suche, Masovian Voivodeship, Poland.

At least two people were killed and 20 others sustained injuries. In total 111 passengers and three crew members were onboard the train.

== Background ==
The Tomaszów Mazowiecki–Radom railway is an electrified 87.2 km (54.2 mi) long railway line, connecting Tomaszów Mazowiecki (in the east) with Radom Główny (in the west). The section where the accident took place was extensively modernised with new tracks in 2025. The line is double-tracked and its maximum speed is 120 km/h (75 mph). The level crossing is unguarded but is equipped with warning lights and CCTV. The crossing is situated approximately 50 m (160 ft) north of national road 12, between Wieniawa and Skrzynno.

== Accident ==
At 11:25 CEST on 9 September 2026, the PKP Intercity train "Koziołek" from Lublin Główny to Szczecin Główny, number 2820/1, derailed after it collided into the side of a cement mixer lorry. The accident occurred at an unguarded level crossing with warning lights in Sokolniki Suche, between Wieniawa and Skrzynno railway stations, on the Tomaszów Mazowiecki–Radom railway. All six carriages hauled by a Class EP09-046 electric locomotive derailed, including the locomotive which tipped onto its side to the adjacent track.

The train was travelling 117 km/h (73 mph) upon derailment; the maximum line speed is 120 km/h (75 mph). The driver of the lorry became trapped inside his vehicle and had to be freed by firefighters.

== Casualties and responses ==
At least one female passenger in the first carriage died. Another 20 passengers were injured, seven of whom were hospitalised, which included the train driver, two train crew members, and the lorry driver; all of whom sustained serious injuries. 30 fire units, eight ambulances, and two air ambulances attended the scene. 67 passengers were transported to a community centre in Skrzynno.

Polish prime minister Donald Tusk said "We will begin work on tightening regulations for those who enter level crossings despite barriers and red lights. This has to stop."

A few hours after the accident, the Trade Union of Train Drivers in Poland (ZZMK) called for all train drivers in Poland to reduce their speed by 20 km/h (10 mph) when passing a level crossing on 11 September 2026 as a protest measure. The appeal applied to all level crossings, regardless of their category. ZZMK also advised train drivers to take their time to exercise extreme caution; "carrying out departure procedures with the utmost caution and without haste". This comes after the major increase in level crossing accidents in Poland since the start of September 2026. The time of the protest was ultimately reduced to take place until noon of 11 September 2026. PKP Polskie Linie Kolejowe reported that around 30% of trains in Poland took part in the protest, resulting in over 23,000 minutes of delays.

PKP Intercity cancelled celebrations for its 25th anniversary and the 100th anniversary of Polish State Railways. It had been scheduled to be held at Warszawa Główna on 10 September.

The lorry driver died in hospital on 15 October.

== Aftermath ==
The line suffered extreme damage; both tracks were deformed, and the overhead wires and their support beams were destroyed. Traffic on the Wolanów–Przysucha section of the Tomaszów Mazowiecki–Radom railway was suspended. Rail replacement bus services were organised for the passengers and other affected services. Tickets for PKP Intercity trains were accepted onboard Polregio and Łódź Agglomeration Railway services. PKP Intercity trains were rerouted, causing delays. Masovian Railways route R82 was substituted by a replacement bus between Radom Główny and Wolanów, in conjunction with another bus service between Wolanów and Drzewica.

The locomotive involved in the collision, EP09-046, nicknamed Rodzyn for its historic paint job, along with two of the derailed carriages, will be scrapped. PKP Intercity later confirmed that the locomotive and carriages would be scrapped on the site of the accident.

The infrastructure operator PKP Polskie Linie Kolejowe (PLK) announced its plan to reopen at least the first track by 11 or 12 September, and estimated the cost of damages at approximately 3 million Polish złoty. Work on removing the derailed locomotive and carriages began on 10 September, using two cranes. According to new findings published by Polsat News on the same day, the train actually collided into the lorry, rather than it colliding into the side of the first carriage.

The last carriage was rerailed on the evening of 11 September. PLK reopened the line at 23:25 on the same day, with the line speed in the section of the accident being temporarily restricted to 60 km/h (35 mph) and level crossing speed to 20 km/h (10 mph) whilst further repair works were under way.

== Preliminary cause ==
An investigation team was dispatched to the accident. According to preliminary findings, the concrete mixer lorry struck the first carriage of the train. This impact is what is believed to have caused the entire train to derail. According to PKP Polskie Linie Kolejowe, the level crossing was unguarded with working warning lights and CCTV.

The Deputy Minister of Infrastructure, Piotr Malepszak, said the driver of the lorry claims to have been "blinded by the sun", although this claim is yet to be confirmed. Malepszak also said that "the broader problem lay with driver training". The prosecutor in Radom confirmed the collision was an accident, saying "We have no grounds to claim that he intended to cause a disaster. We assume that he failed to exercise due care".

== See also ==
- Tomaszów Mazowiecki–Radom railway
- 2026 Białośliwie train collision
