= Warszawa Okęcie–Jeziorna railway =

Freight line in central Poland

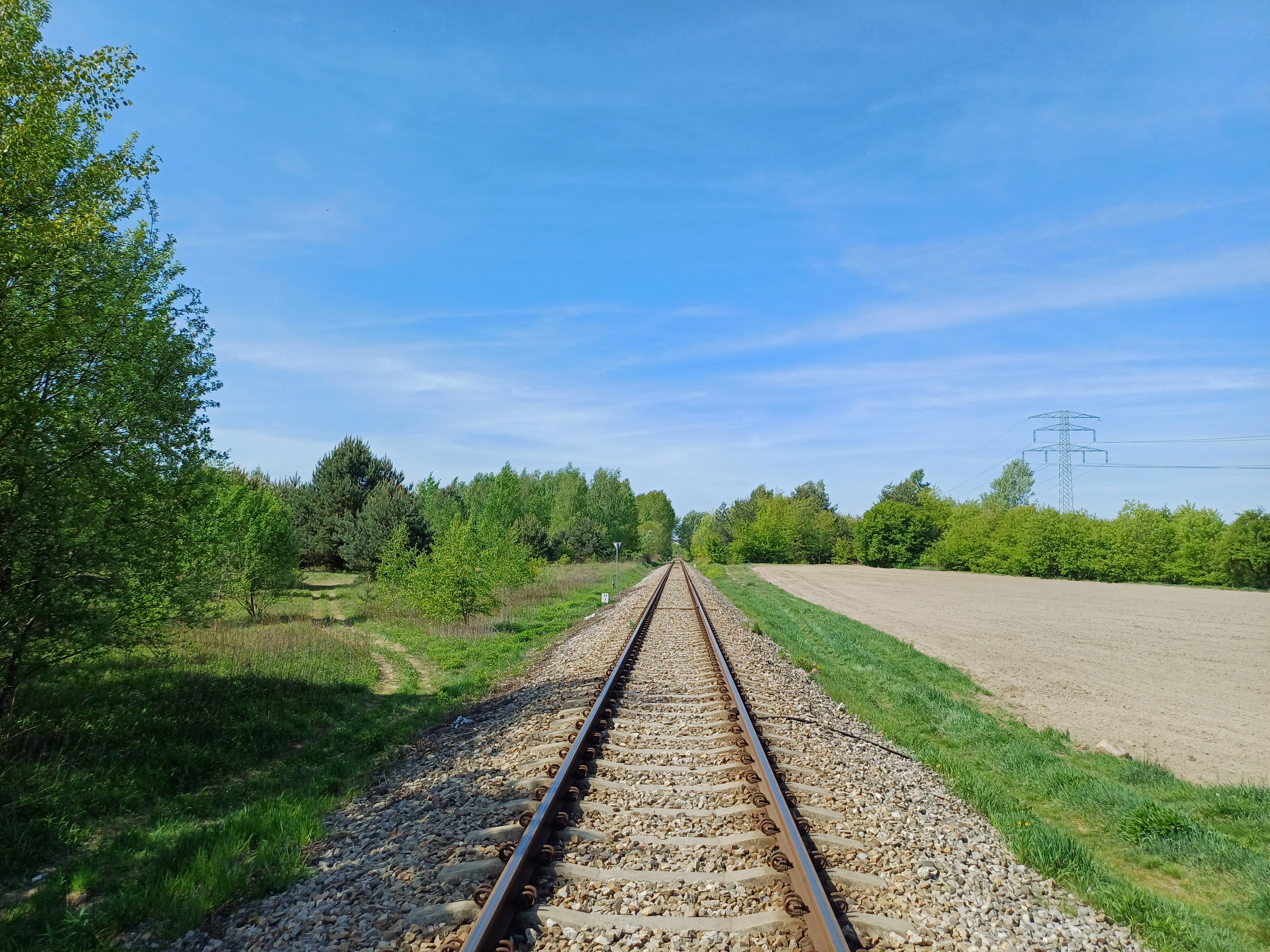
- Tracks

Overview
- Owner: Orlen Termika
- Line number: PKP 937
- Locale: Masovian Voivodeship, Poland
- Termini: Warszawa Okęcie; Jeziorna

History
- Opened: 1 October 1935

Technical
- Line length: 18.8 km (11.7 mi)
- Number of tracks: 1
- Track gauge: 1,435 mm (4 ft 8 1/2 in) standard gauge
- Operating speed: 30 km/h (19 mph)

The Warszawa Okęcie–Jeziorna railway is an unelectrified freight railway line stretching from Warszawa Okęcie railway station in Warsaw and Jeziorna railway station in Konstancin-Jeziorna in the Masovian Voivodeship of central Poland.

The line is connected to Kabaty depot of the Warsaw Metro from Warszawa Okęcie railway station. It primarily transports hard coal, fuel oil, and biomass to the Siekierki Cogeneration Plant plant in Warsaw.

== History ==
The first part of the line was opened as a siding on 1 October 1935 to serve a paper factory in Konstancin-Jeziorna. After World War II, the line was expanded to electric power plants in Piaseczno and the Siekierki Cogeneration Plant plant in Warsaw.

== Proposal of passenger services ==
Since 2008, there have been several proposals of bringing passenger services to the railway line, as it is currently only used by freight trains. Most recently, in May 2023, Polish State Railways proposed the construction of three new railway stations on the line: Piaseczno Śniadeckich, Konstancin Jeziorna and Konstancin-Jeziorna Mirkowska.

Other times, during local elections, occasional railbus rides with the press took place, but no other actions aimed at implementing passenger services were taken.

Another proposal proposed the construction of five new railway stations in Nowa Iwiczna, Piaseczno, Julianów, Kierszek, and Jeziorna.
