= Michalczew railway station =

Railway station in Michalczew, Poland

Michalczew
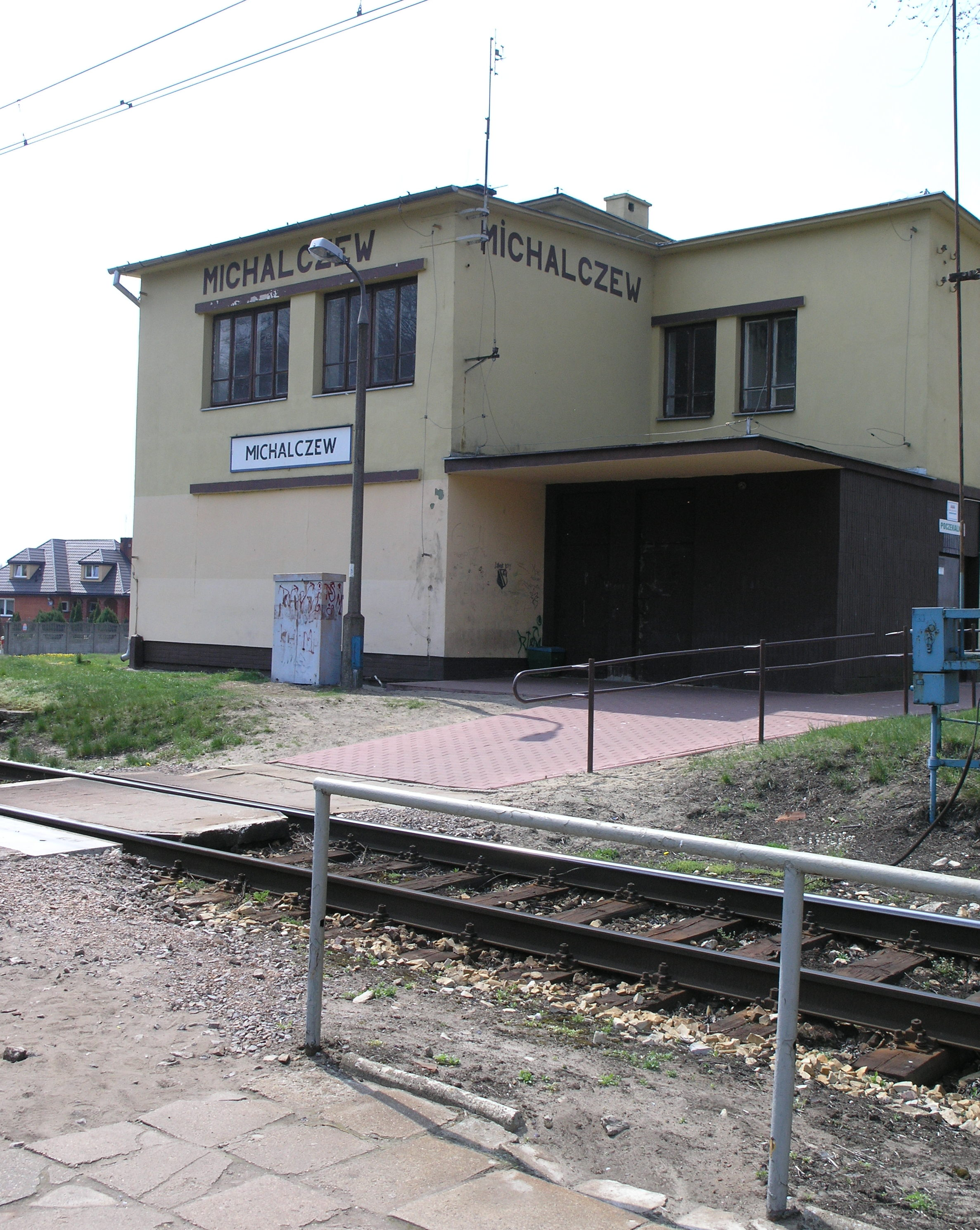

General information
- Location: Michalczew, Warka, Grójec, Masovian; Poland
- Coordinates: 51.8449928°N 21.1201788°E
- System: Rail Station
- Owner: Polskie Koleje Państwowe S.A.

Services
Preceding station	Masovian Railways	Following station
Gośniewice towards Skarżysko-Kamienna	R8	Krężel towards Warszawa Wschodnia
Location

Michalczew railway station is a railway station at Michalczew, Grójec, Masovian, Poland. It is served by Masovian Railways.
