= PKP class EP09 =

Class of Polish electric locomotive

- EP09 locomotive in 2026
Type and origin
- Power type: Electric
- Builder: Pafawag
- Build date: 1986–1997
- Total produced: 47
Specifications
- Configuration
  - UIC: Bo′Bo′
- Gauge: 1,435 mm (4 ft 8 1/2 in) standard gauge
- Wheel diameter: 1,250 mm (49.21 in)
- Length: 16,740 mm (54 ft 11 in)
- Width: 2,974 mm (9 ft 9 in)
- Height: 4,300 mm (14 ft 1 in)
- Axle load: 20 t (20 long tons; 22 short tons)
- Loco weight: 83.5 t (82.2 long tons; 92.0 short tons)
- Electric system/s: 3000 V DC Catenary
- Current pickup: Pantograph
- Traction motors: 4× LKa740, 73:38 gear ratio
- Loco brake: Oerlikon Contraves+Dynamic
- Safety systems: SHP
Performance figures
- Maximum speed: 160 km/h (99 mph)
- Power output: 2,920 kW (3,916 hp)
Career
- Operators: PKP
- Nicknames: Dziewiątka (The Nine); Epoka (The Era)
- First run: May 29, 1988

EP09 (also manufactured as Pafawag 104E) is a Polish electric locomotive used by the Polish railways, Polskie Koleje Państwowe (PKP) and produced by Pafawag of Wrocław between 1986 and 1997.

== History ==
=== Construction ===
Work on designing a new family of Polish locomotives able to pull trains at speeds higher than 125 km/h, started in the 1970s. Of those plans only one was finally realised, which resulted in the construction of EP09 locomotives.

In the beginning of the 1980s the CMK line (central rail line) was prepared for passenger transport. Up until then, it had been used exclusively for freight transport. Initially, EU05 and EP05 locomotives were used to run services on this line, but Polish railways needed faster locomotives, reaching 160 km/h.

The locomotive was designed in Ośrodek Badawczo-Rozwojowy Pojazdów Szynowych (Rail Vehicles Research and Development Centre) in Poznań. The prototype was ready in 1986, built in Pafawag in Wrocław. The locomotive was intended to be built with western parts, but severe financial restrictions caused many modern solutions to be abandoned. Co-operation with the USSR had little effect as well. Additionally, after the collapse of Eastern Bloc, Poland was forced to use old EP07 solutions in later series of EP09.

=== Deployment ===
It is impossible to find two identical locomotives of this class, as the design changed after each machine was completed. The First EP09 locomotive was presented in 1986, the next one in 1987. On May 29, 1988, according to the new timetable, those two locomotives started regular service. In 2005 EP09's livery was revised and unveiled. The locomotives are being repainted in during scheduled servicing.

All the locomotives produced, except for EP09-035 (which was involved in the Szczekociny rail crash) and EP09-046 (Sokolniki Suche train collision), are still fully operational and are deployed in the locomotive depots in Kraków and Warsaw. 12 units work in Kraków Prokocim depot, the rest are assigned to Warsaw. Besides running on the CMK line, those locomotives can be spotted on Warsaw–Poznań–Szczecin, Warsaw–Poznań–Wrocław, Warsaw–Lublin and Warsaw–Kielce lines. EP09 series proved itself to be highly defective, e.g. in 1996 PKP was forced to replace 10 traction motors and 24 bogies. In the same time serious breakdowns of compressors were noticed. In the end of 2000 EP09 were temporarily sent to Gdańsk. This was done in order to familiarise engineers with this type of locomotive before raising maximum allowed speed on the Warsaw–Gdańsk line.

=== Modernisation ===
In August 2021 PKP Intercity issued a request for proposal to comprehensively modernise all 46 locomotives, bringing them up to modern standard, a.o. replacing DC traction motors with asynchronous ones and motor-generator sets with switch-mode inverters, modernising bogies, and preparing the locomotives for the installation of ETCS.

== Technical data ==
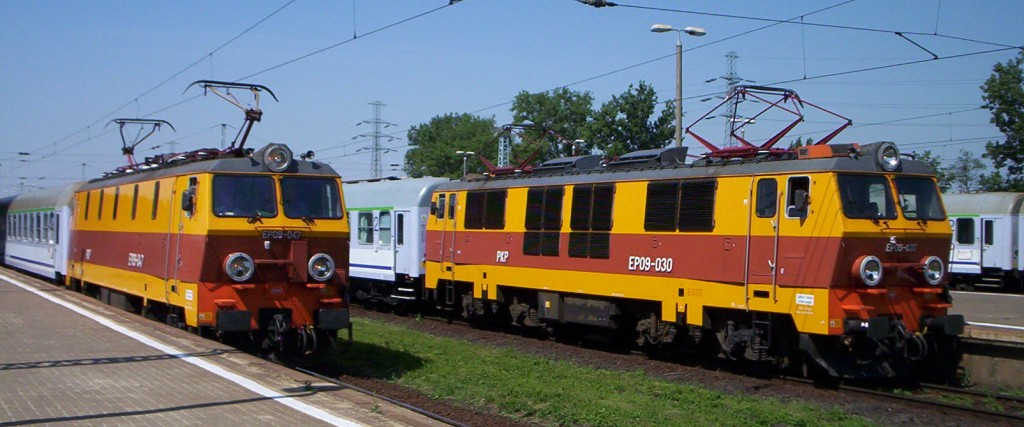
EP09-47 (left) and EP09-30 locomotives in Warsaw. Note the difference between front parts of locomotives (EP09-47 has additional air-intake mounted due to air-conditioning system installed) and between the types of pantographs.

The EP09 is a Bo-Bo electric locomotive working in 3000 V DC electric system. The body is placed on two bogies, with each bogie having two separately propelled axles. Driver's cabs are located on each end of the loco's body.

There are battery box and air tanks mounted between bogies. Traction motors and transmissions are locked inside bogies. Behind each cab is the machine compartment. High-voltage compartment is situated in the middle of the locomotive. EP09 is the first Polish locomotive to have electro-dynamic brakes. This enables braking the locomotive using the motors working as generators.

Other modifications to EP09 were e.g. ergonomic dashboard and windscreens equipped with internal heating.

Since locomotive number 38 the system of suspending locomotive on bogies was changed into Flexicoil and single pantographs (DSA200, Stemmann production) were mounted instead of the previously used double ones. Another important change during the production process is installing air conditioning system (since locomotive number 40). For a long time PKP worked on bringing all machines to the same standard as the last two locomotives (046 and 047) brought into service in January 1998.

== Nicknames ==
- Dziewiątka (The Nine) - after the number in the name
- Epoka (The Epoch) - after the first two letters of the name

== Accidents and incidents ==
- On 3 March 2012 the EP09 with number 035 was involved in the Szczekociny rail crash. The locomotive was later scrapped.
- On 9 September 2026, unit 046 was involved in a derailment after a cement mixer lorry collided into the carriages of the train in Sokolniki Suche, Masovian Voivodeship. It will be subsequently scrapped.
