= Krężel railway station =

Railway station in Masovian Voivodeship, Poland

Krężel
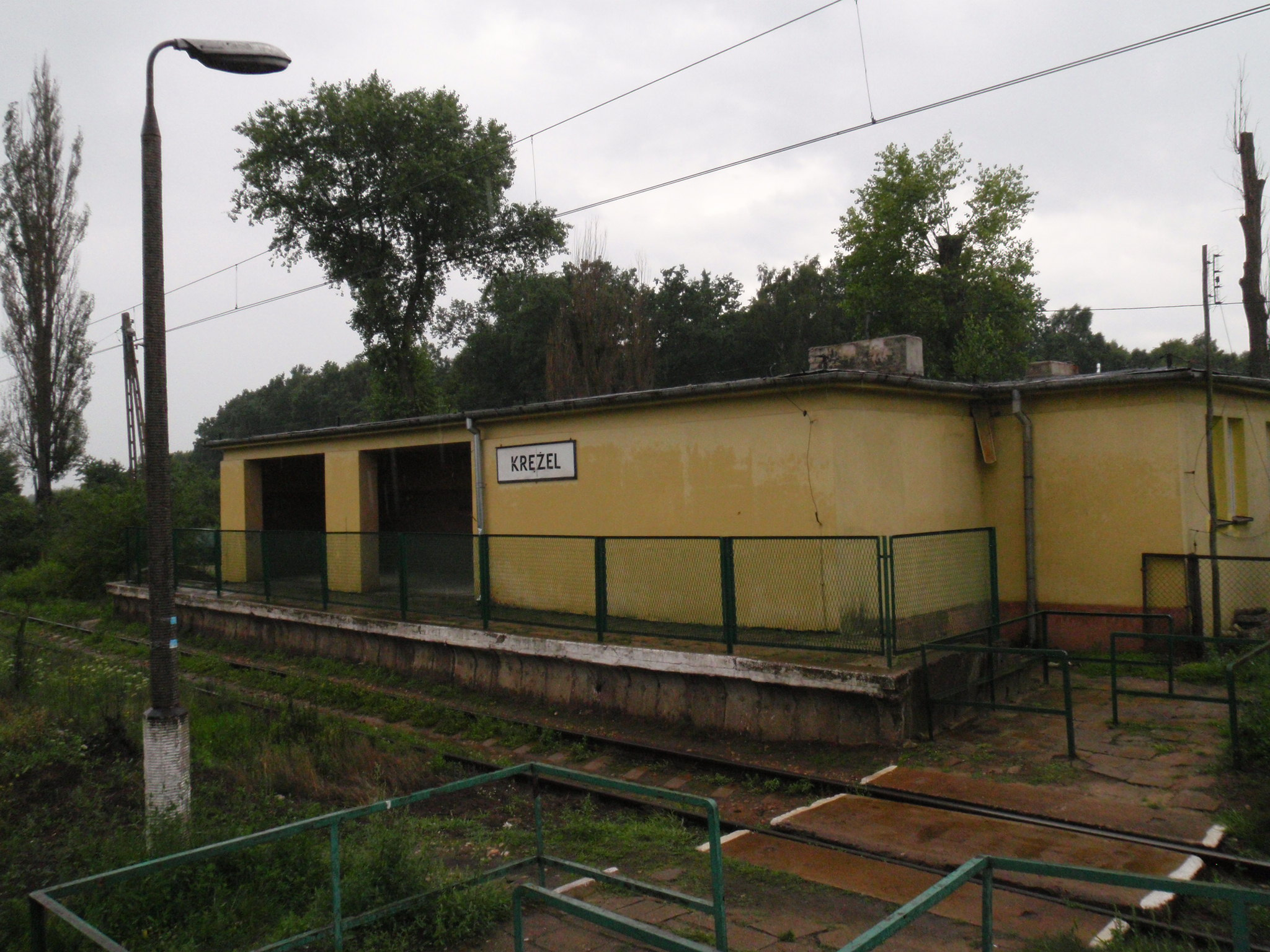

General information
- Location: Krężel, Chynów, Grójec, Masovian; Poland
- Coordinates: 51.8723158°N 21.1113276°E
- System: Rail Station
- Owner: Polskie Koleje Państwowe S.A.

Services
Preceding station	Masovian Railways	Following station
Michalczew towards Skarżysko-Kamienna	R8	Chynów towards Warszawa Wschodnia
Location

Krężel railway station is a railway station at Krężel, Masovian Voivodeship. It is served by Masovian Railways.
