= Chynów railway station =

Railway station in Masovian Voivodeship, Poland

Chynów
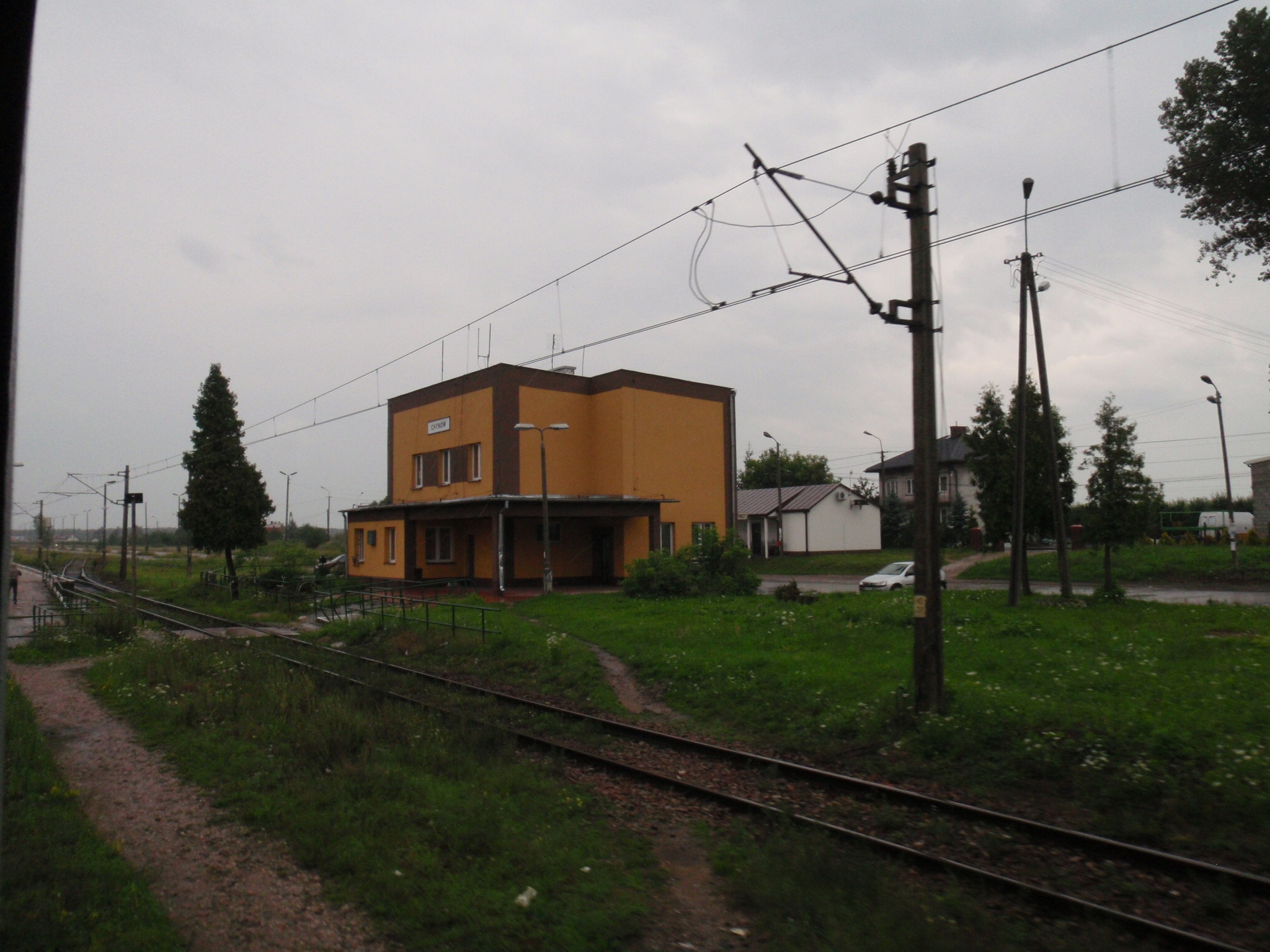

General information
- Location: Chynów, Chynów, Grójec, Masovian; Poland
- Coordinates: 51.9021825°N 21.1002608°E
- System: Rail Station
- Owner: Polskie Koleje Państwowe S.A.

Services
Preceding station	Masovian Railways	Following station
Krężel towards Skarżysko-Kamienna	R8	Sułkowice towards Warszawa Wschodnia
Warka towards Radom	RE8 Trains No. 12680/12681	Sułkowice towards Warszawa Wschodnia
Warka towards Skarżysko-Kamienna	RE8 Trains No. 12690/12691	Czachówek Południowy towards Warszawa Wschodnia
Location

Chynów railway station is a railway station at Chynów, Grójec, Masovian, Poland. It is served by Masovian Railways.
