= Czachówek Wschodni railway station =

Railway station in Czarny Las, Poland

Czachówek Wschodni
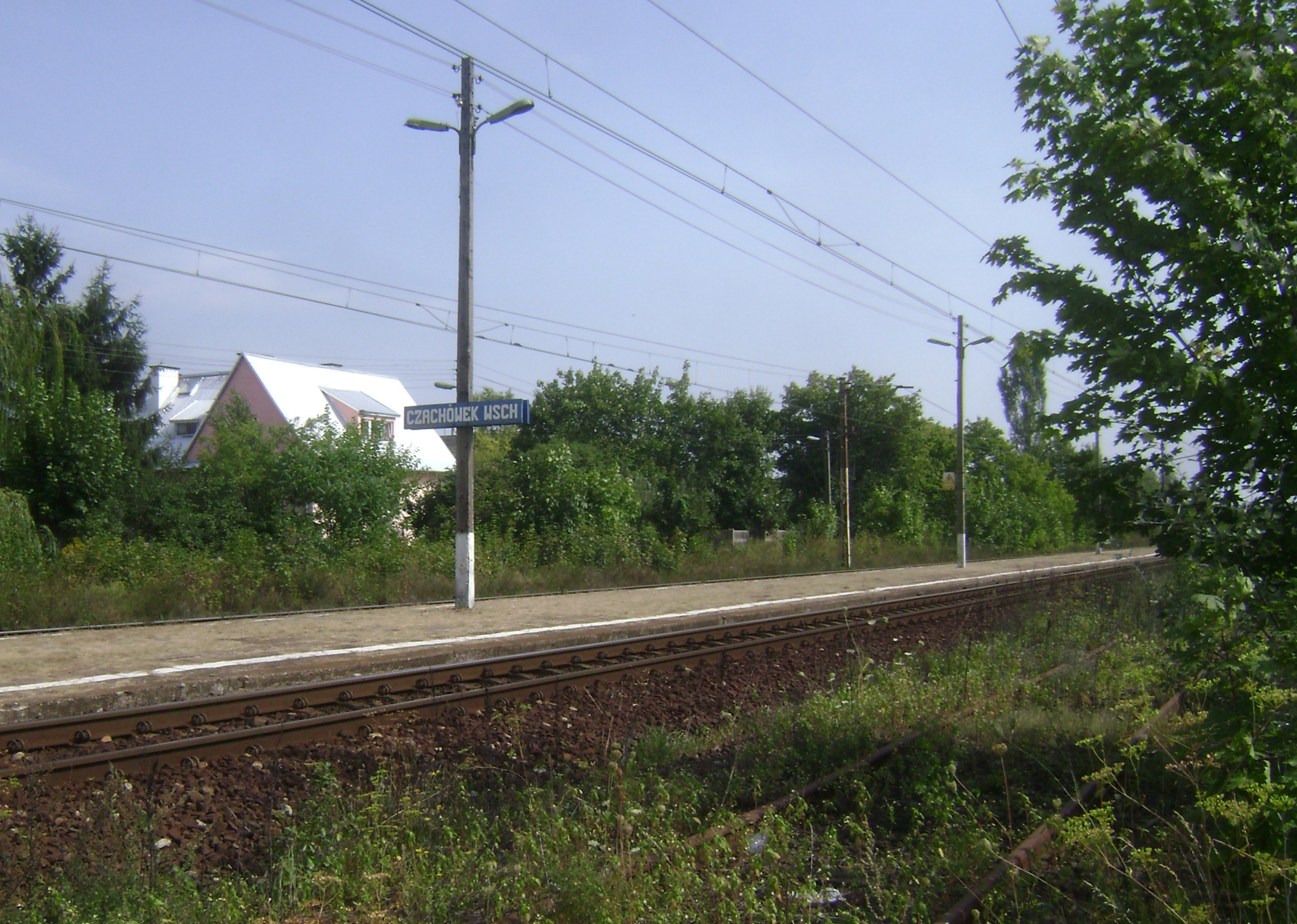

General information
- Location: Czarny Las, Góra Kalwaria, Piaseczno, Masovian; Poland
- Coordinates: 51.9734703°N 21.1046488°E
- System: Rail Station
- Owner: Polskie Koleje Państwowe S.A.

Services
Preceding station	Masovian Railways	Following station
Góra Kalwaria Terminus	R8	Czachówek Południowy towards Warszawa Wschodnia
Location

Czachówek Wschodni railway station is a railway station at Czarny Las, Piaseczno, Masovian, Poland. It is served by Masovian Railways.
