= Tomaszów Mazowiecki–Radom railway =

Railway line in central Poland

- Line near Podbór in September 2011

Overview
- Status: Operational
- Owner: PKP Polskie Linie Kolejowe
- Line number: PKP 22
- Locale: Łódź and Masovian voivodeships, Poland
- Termini: Tomaszów Mazowiecki; Radom Główny

Service
- Operators: Łódź Agglomeration Railway; Polregio; PKP Intercity

History
- Opened: 9 May 1948
- Last extension: 9 January 1949

Technical
- Line length: 87.237 km (54.207 mi)
- Number of tracks: 2: Radzice–Radom Potkanów; 1: Tomaszów Mazowiecki–Radzice, Radom Potkanów–Radom Główny
- Track gauge: 1,435 mm (4 ft 8 1/2 in) standard gauge
- Electrification: 3 kV DC OLE
- Operating speed: 120 km/h (75 mph) maximum
Route map

The Tomaszów Mazowiecki–Radom railway is an electrified, double-track, railway line connecting Tomaszów Mazowiecki railway station in Tomaszów Mazowiecki and Radom Główny railway station in Radom, in the Łódź and Masovian voivodeships in central Poland.

== History ==
The line opened in two sections, first on 9 May 1948 between Tomaszów Mazowiecki and Drzewica. The extension to Radom Główny was completed on 9 January 1949.

Due to the progressive deterioration of the line, some maximum speeds were reduced to as low as 40 km/h (25 mph). Initial extensive modernisation work began in 2014 and 2016 by each section. The Wolanów–Wieniawa section underwent modernisations in 2020, whilst the second track at Radzice was renovated in 2021. Modernisation of the remainder of the line's tracks and station platforms is being carried out since 2025. Once works are completed, the entire line speed will increase to 120 km/h (75 mph).

== Accidents and incidents ==
- On 9 September 2026 at 11:25 CEST, between Wolanów and Skrzynno a PKP Intercity train derailed after a concrete mixer lorry had collided into the train at a level crossing in Sokolniki Suche. At least one person died and another twenty were injured.

== See also ==
- Sokolniki Suche train collision
