= Piaseczno railway station =

Railway station in Piaseczno, Poland

Piaseczno
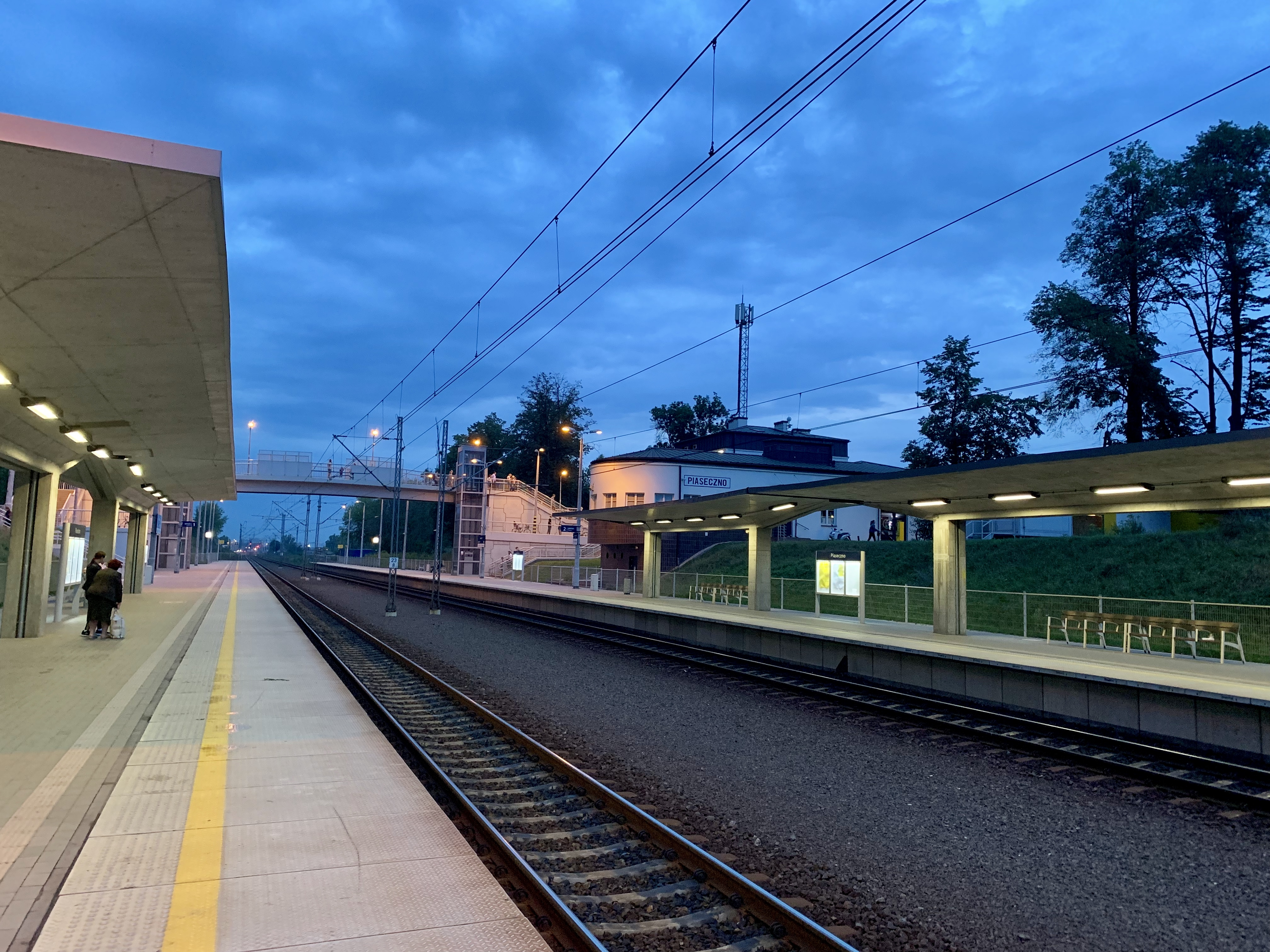

General information
- Location: Piaseczno, Piaseczno, Piaseczno, Masovian; Poland
- Coordinates: 52.0662687°N 21.0171528°E
- System: Rail Station
- Owner: Polskie Koleje Państwowe S.A.

Services
Preceding station	Masovian Railways	Following station
Zalesie Górne towards Góra Kalwaria or Skarżysko-Kamienna	R8	Nowa Iwiczna towards Warszawa Wschodnia
Zalesie Górne towards Skarżysko-Kamienna	RE8 Trains No. 12690/12691	Nowa Iwiczna towards Warszawa Wschodnia
Zalesie Górne towards Radom	RE8 Trains No. 12680/12681	Nowa Iwiczna towards Warszawa Wschodnia
Preceding station	SKM Warsaw	Following station
Terminus	S4	Nowa Iwiczna towards Zegrze Południowe
Terminus	S40	Nowa Iwiczna towards Warszawa Rakowiec
Location

Piaseczno railway station is a railway station at Piaseczno, Piaseczno, Masovian, Poland. It is served by Masovian Railways.
