= Sułkowice, Masovian Voivodeship =

Sułkowice
- Village
- Location within Poland
- Coordinates: 51°55′37″N 21°5′47″E
- Country: Poland
- Voivodeship: Masovian
- County: Grójec
- Gmina: Chynów
- Population: 1,100

Sułkowice [suu̯kɔˈvit͡sɛ] is a village in the administrative district of Gmina Chynów, within Grójec County, Masovian Voivodeship, in east-central Poland.
