= Adolf Schimmelpfennig =

German historian (1815–1887)

- Born: Carl Adolf Schimmelpfennig; 14 November 1815; Oels, Lower Silesia, Prussia
- Died: 2 September 1887 (aged 71); Breslau, Lower Silesia, Germany
- Occupations: Historian; librarian

Adolf Schimmelpfennig (14 November 1815 – 2 September 1887) was a German historian.

== Life ==
Carl Adolf Schimmelpfennig was born in Oels, a mid-sized town a short distance to the east of Breslau. He was born into an impoverished family, but his parents died while he was still very young and he grew up in the town's orphanage. Here his scholarly potential was identified, and for his secondary schooling he attended the local Gymnasium (school) where he passed his School final exam (Abitur) at the age of just 17½. His subsequent study of Evangelical Theology at Breslau was interrupted by military service in 1834/35, but he nevertheless completed his studies and received his degree in 1838/39.

In 1843 he became a Protestant minister at Arnsdorf a short distance to the south of Strehlen, still in Lower Silesia. He would retain this incumbency until 1879 when poor health led to his reluctant retirement from it. In the meantime, in 1862 he received his doctorate from the Philosophy Faculty at the University of Wrocław for a piece of work on Gregory of Nazianzus' Carmen LIV.

In 1879 Schimmelpfennig relocated to Breslau where he was able to apply his scholarly proclivities to work as librarian for the Silesian Society for German Culture. He also had more time for writing, and published numerous essays on historical and church matters in the Journal of the Silesian Historical Society. More readily accessible today are approximately sixty biographical entries that he contributed to the Allgemeine Deutsche Biographie (German National Biographical Dictionary). His contributions focus on theologians and scholars from Silesia.
