= Jeziórko, Masovian Voivodeship =

Jeziórko
- Village
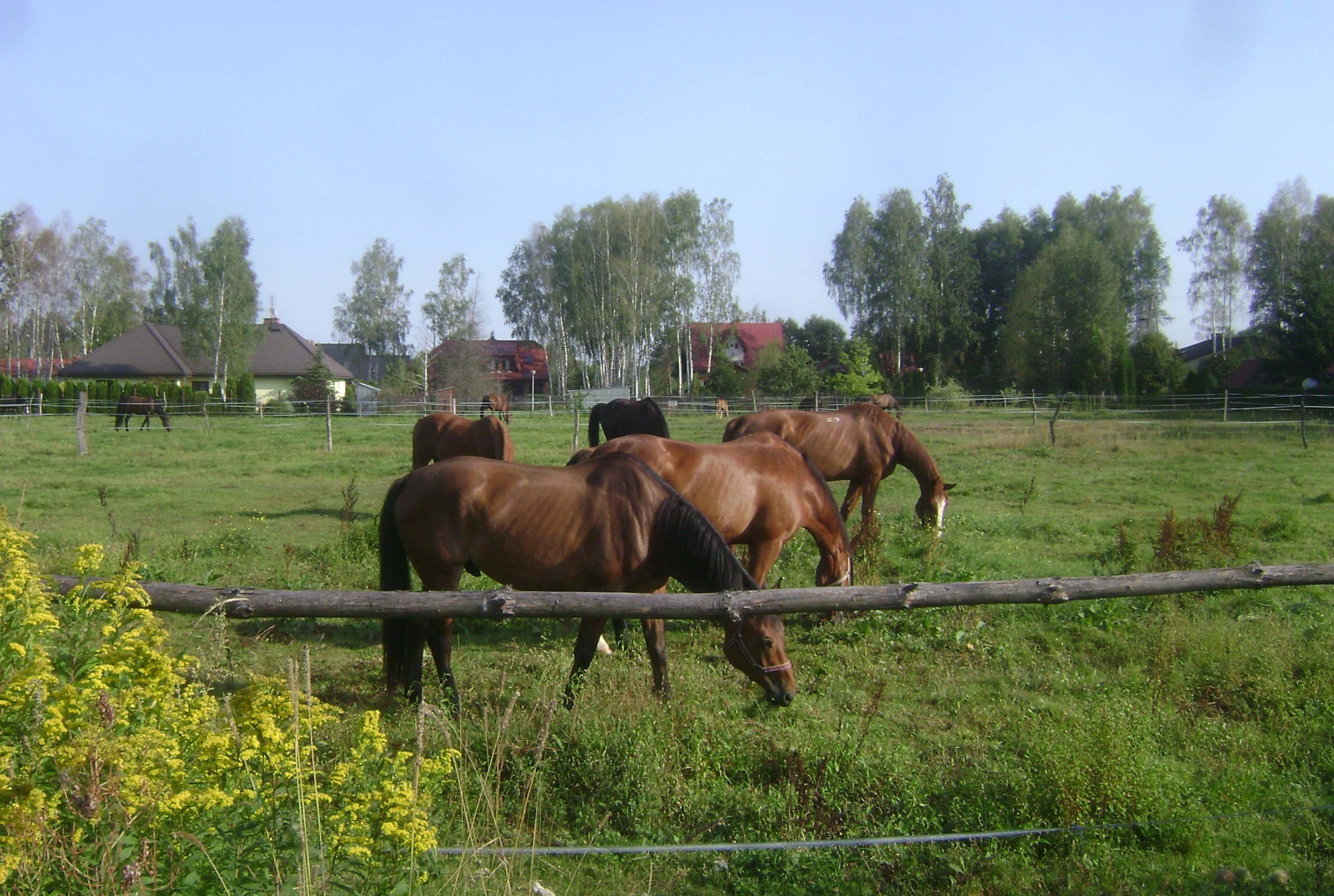

- Location within Poland
- Coordinates: 51°59′N 21°3′E
- Country: Poland
- Voivodeship: Masovian
- County: Piaseczno
- Gmina: Prażmów
- Population: 350

Jeziórko [jɛˈʑurkɔ] is a village in the administrative district of Gmina Prażmów, within Piaseczno County, Masovian Voivodeship, in east-central Poland.
