= Czarny Las, Piaseczno County =

Czarny Las
- Village
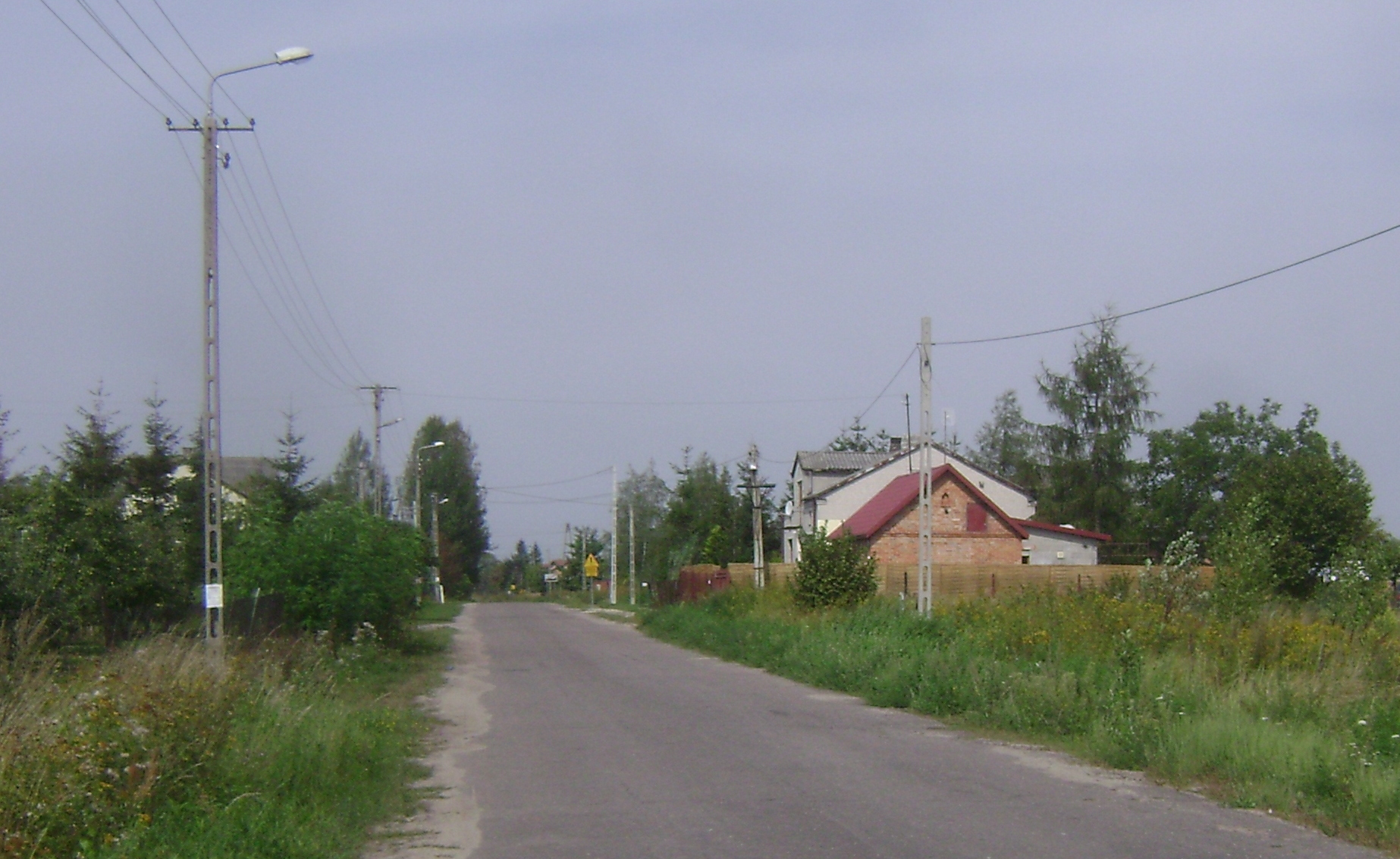

- Location within Poland
- Coordinates: 51°58′40″N 21°5′56″E
- Country: Poland
- Voivodeship: Masovian
- County: Piaseczno
- Gmina: Góra Kalwaria

Czarny Las [ˈt͡ʂarnɨ ˈlas] is a village in the administrative district of Gmina Góra Kalwaria, within Piaseczno County, Masovian Voivodeship, in east-central Poland.
