= Krężel, Masovian Voivodeship =

Krężel
- Village
- Location within Poland
- Coordinates: 51°52′14″N 21°5′27″E
- Country: Poland
- Voivodeship: Masovian
- County: Grójec
- Gmina: Chynów
- Population: 191

Krężel [ˈkrɛ̃ʐɛl] is a village in the administrative district of Gmina Chynów, within Grójec County, Masovian Voivodeship, in east-central Poland.
