= Zalesie Górne =

- Village
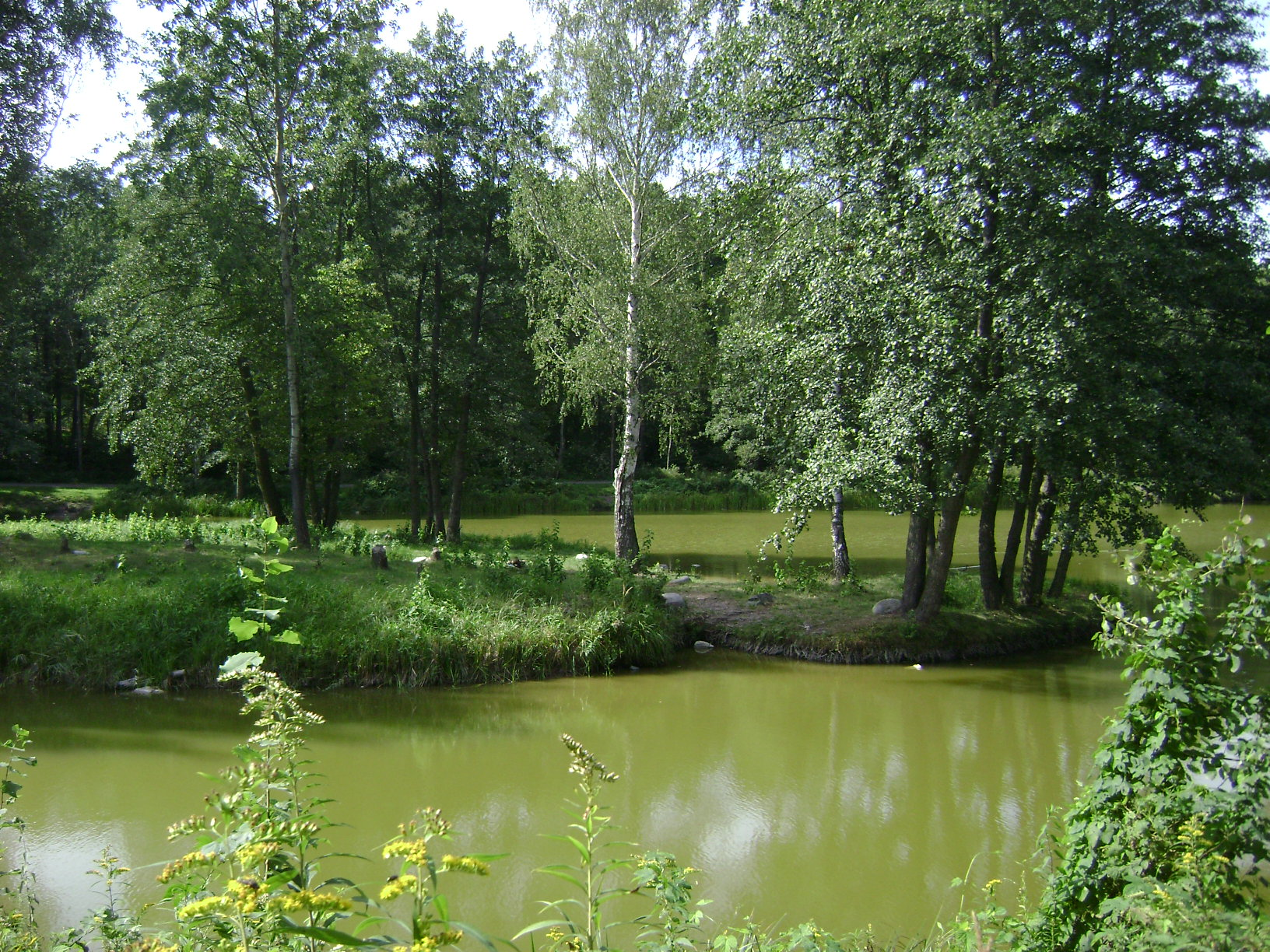

- Location within Poland
- Coordinates: 52°3′N 21°3′E
- Country: Poland
- Voivodeship: Masovian
- County: Piaseczno
- Gmina: Piaseczno

Population (2013)
  - Total: 3,867
- Time zone: UTC+1 (CET)
  - Summer (DST): UTC+2 (CEST)
- Vehicle registration: WPI

Zalesie Górne [zaˈlɛɕɛ ˈɡurnɛ] is a village in the administrative district of Gmina Piaseczno, within Piaseczno County, Masovian Voivodeship, in the Warsaw metropolitan area, in east-central Poland.

As of 2013 its population was 3867. Located on provincial road No. 873 and with a station on the Warsaw-Radom railway line the village is today an affluent commuter suburb of the capital. The surrounding forests are likewise a popular vacation spot for Warsaw residents.

Landmarks in the town include the school, railway station, and the Roman Catholic parish of St. Hubert. The town lies adjacent to the Chojnów Landscape Park.

== History ==
The village was founded in the 1930s.

Five Polish citizens were murdered by Nazi Germany in the village during World War II.

== Notable people ==
- Patryk Peda (born 2002), Polish professional football player

== Gallery ==
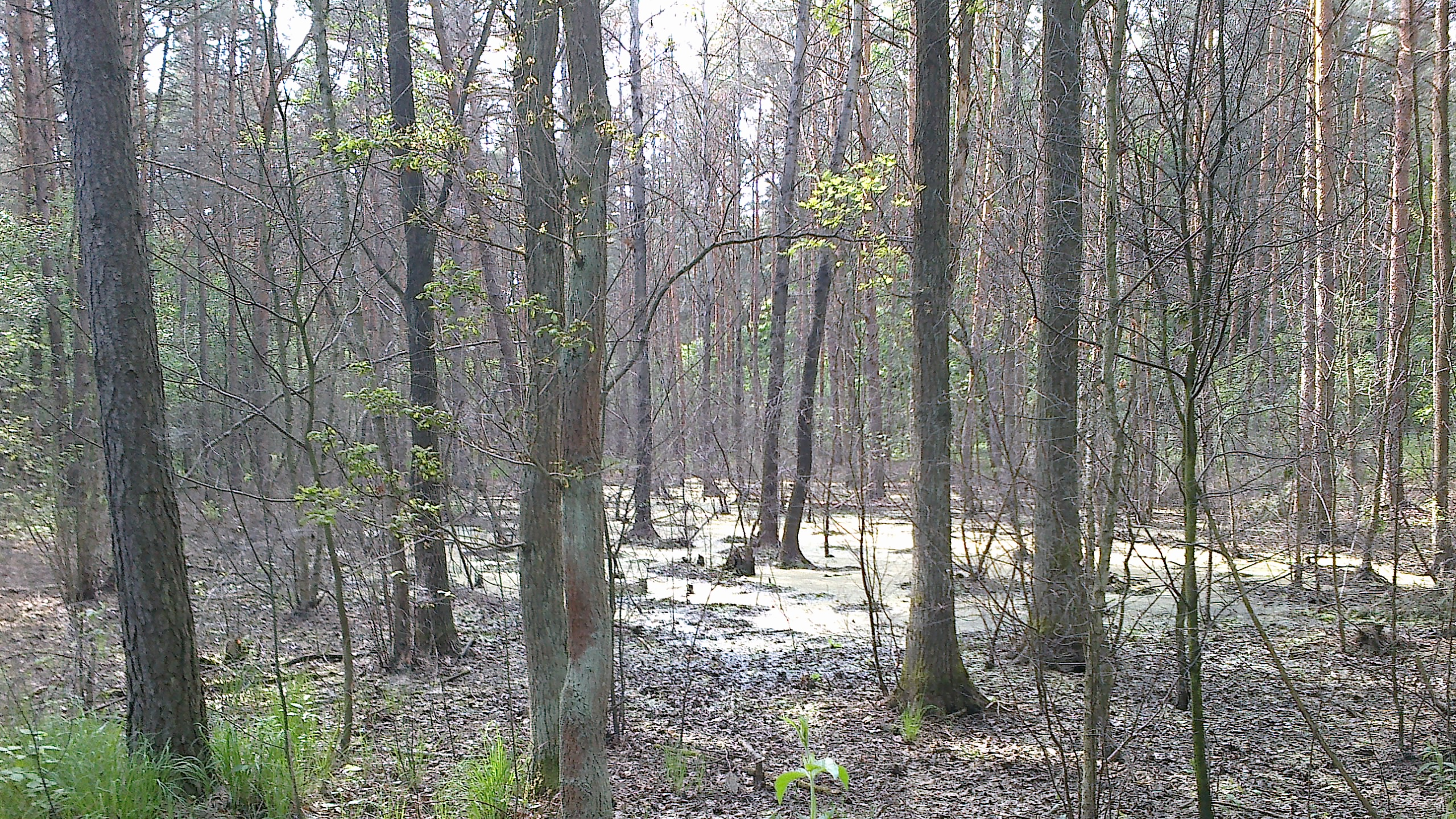
Chojnów Landscape Park

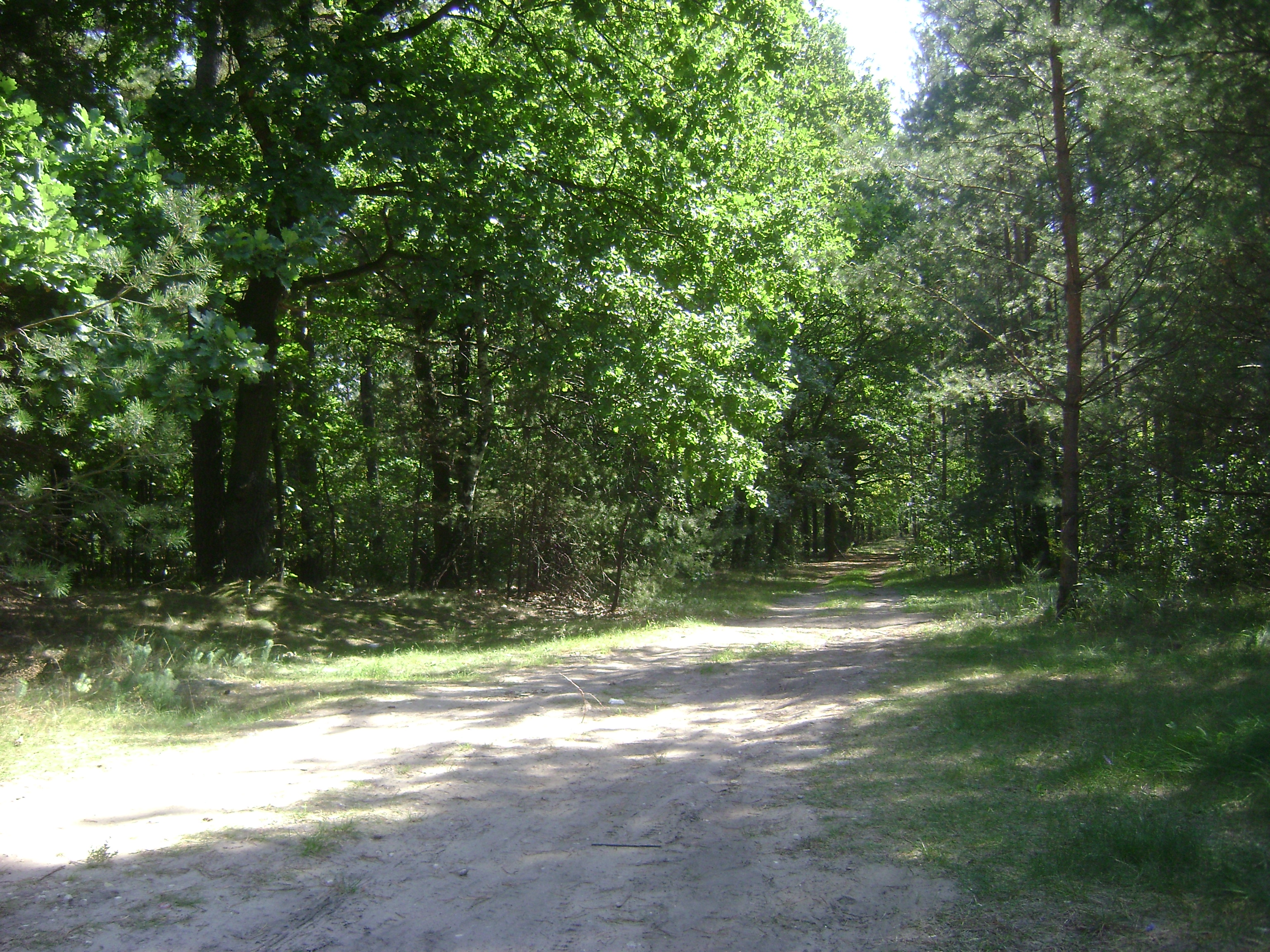
Chojnów Landscape Park

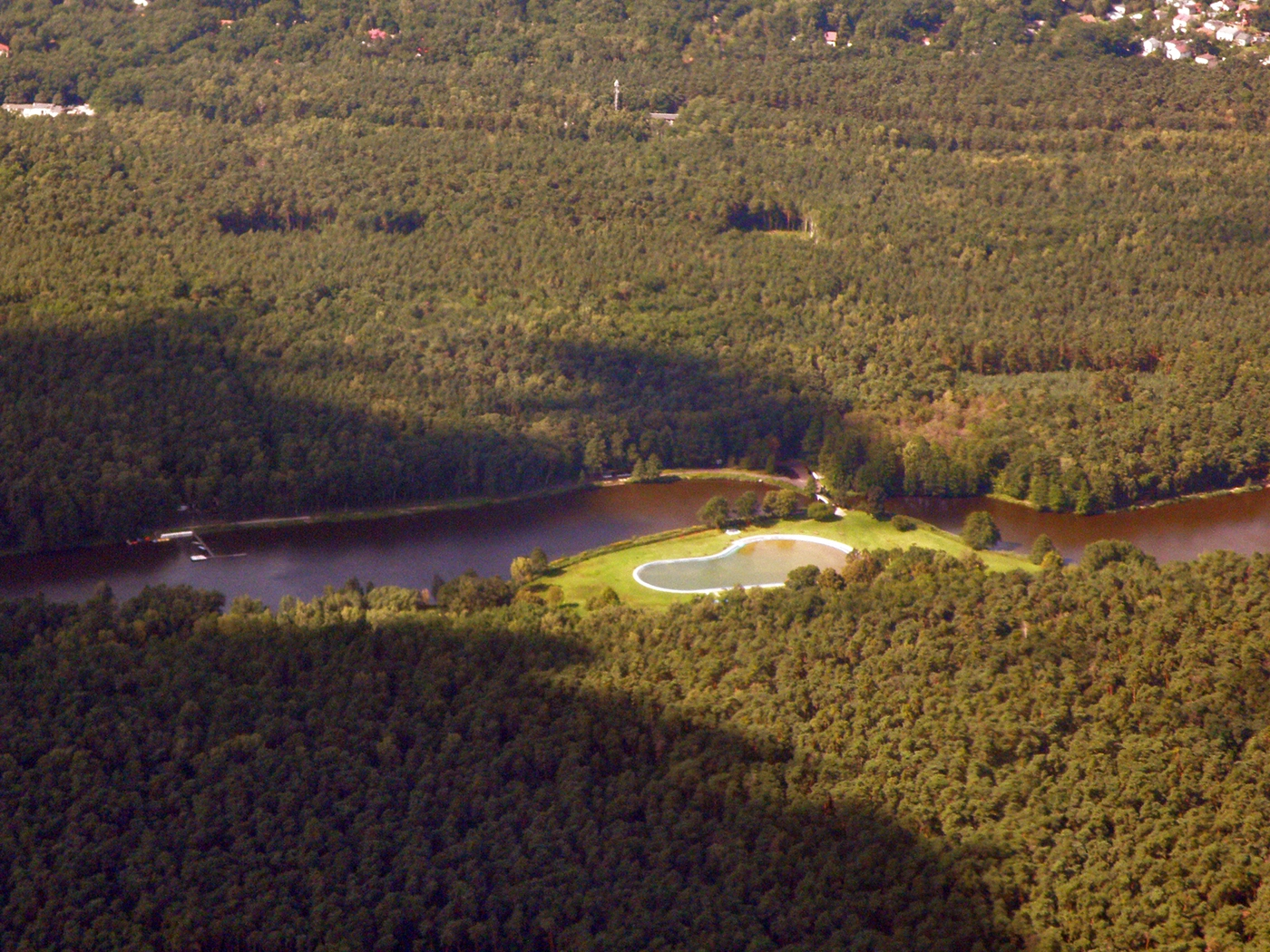
Air photo of Chojnów Park

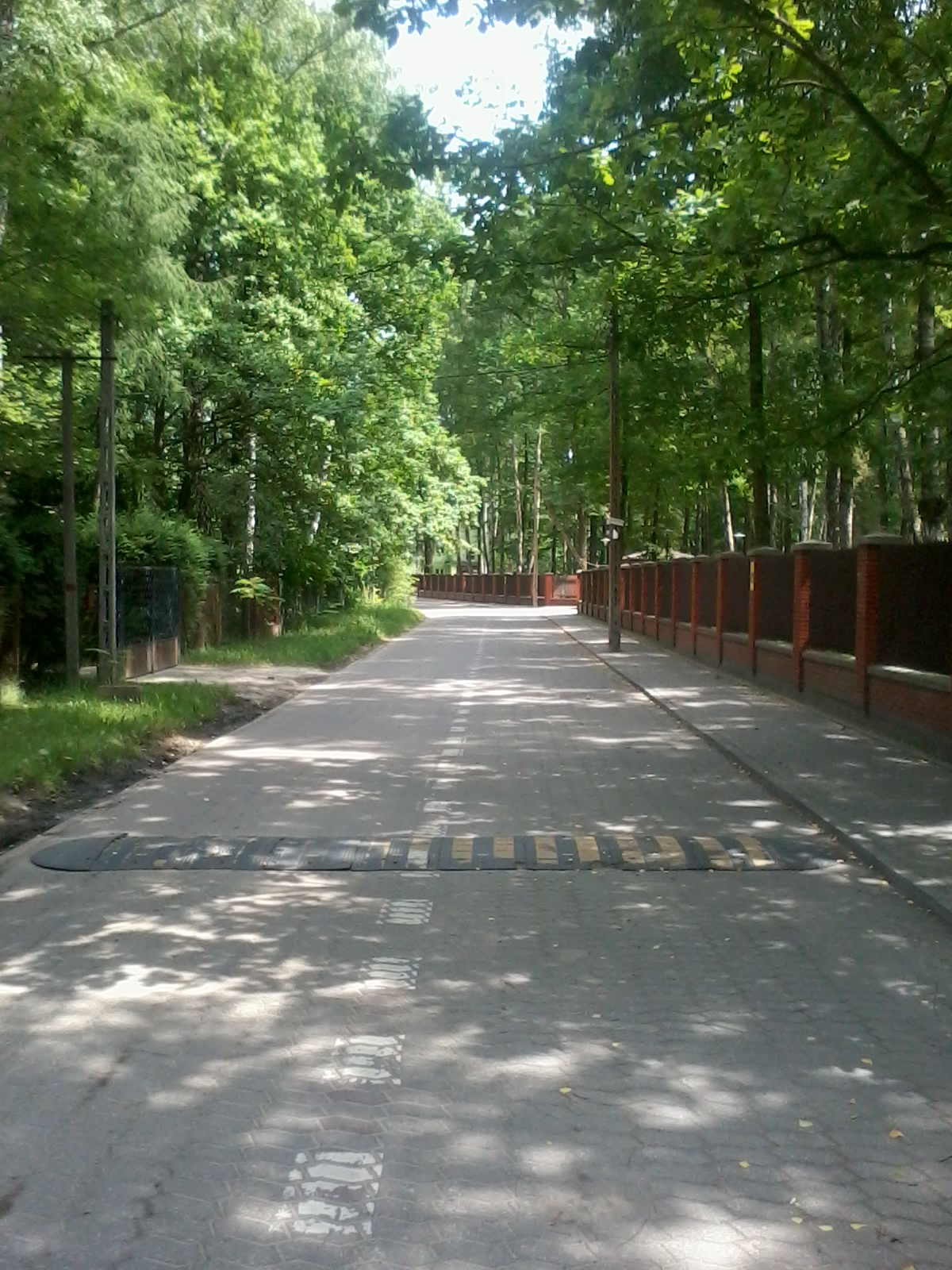
Białej Brzozy Street

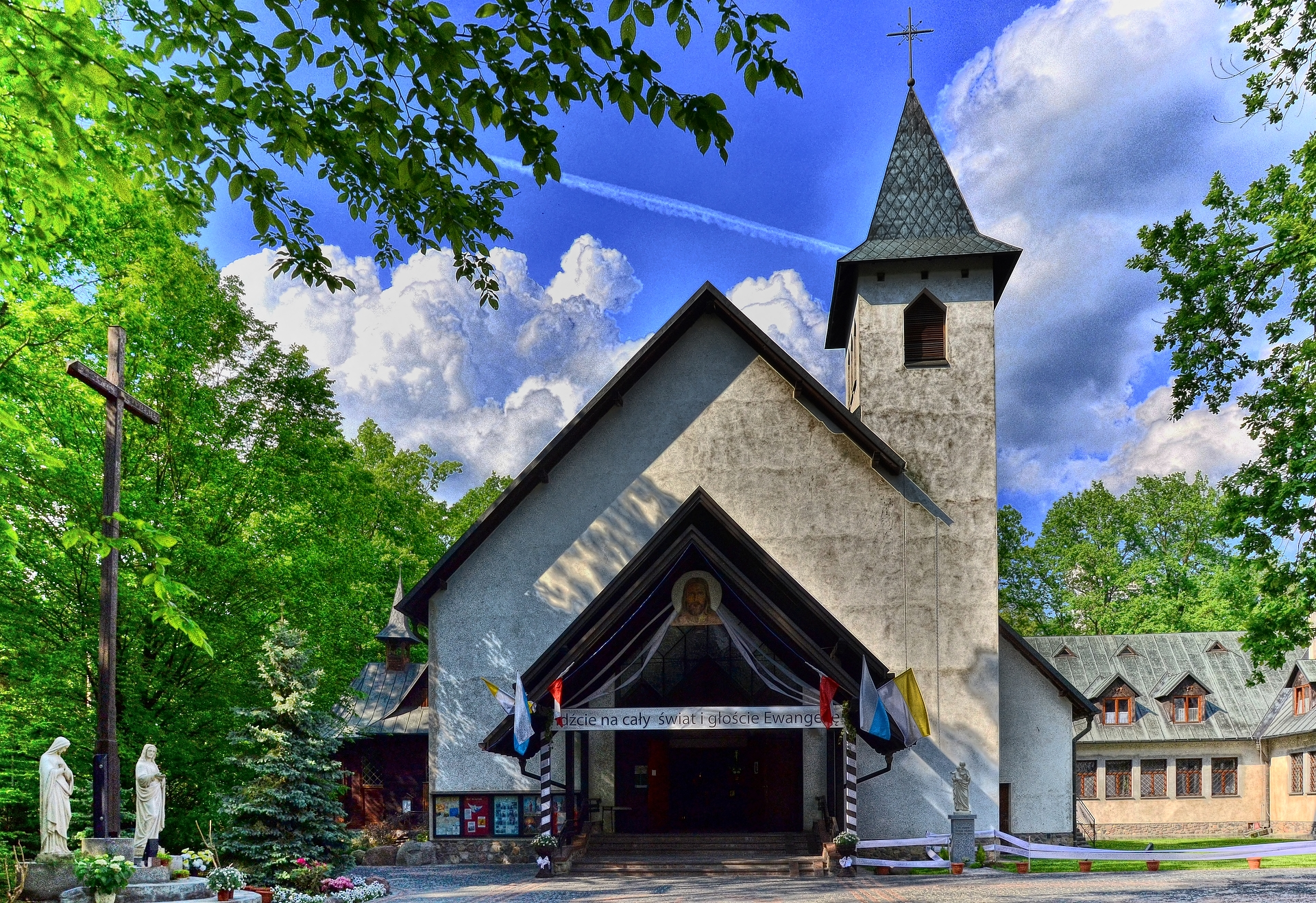
St Hubert's Church

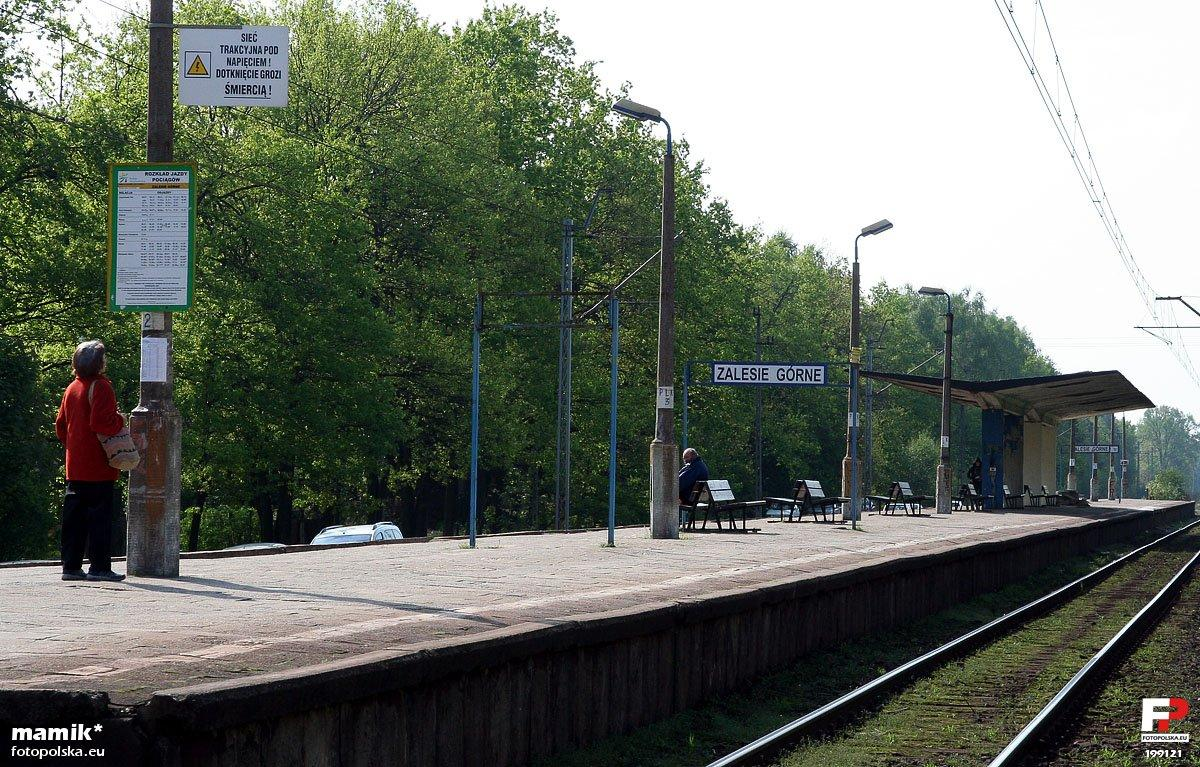
Zalesie Górne Railway Station

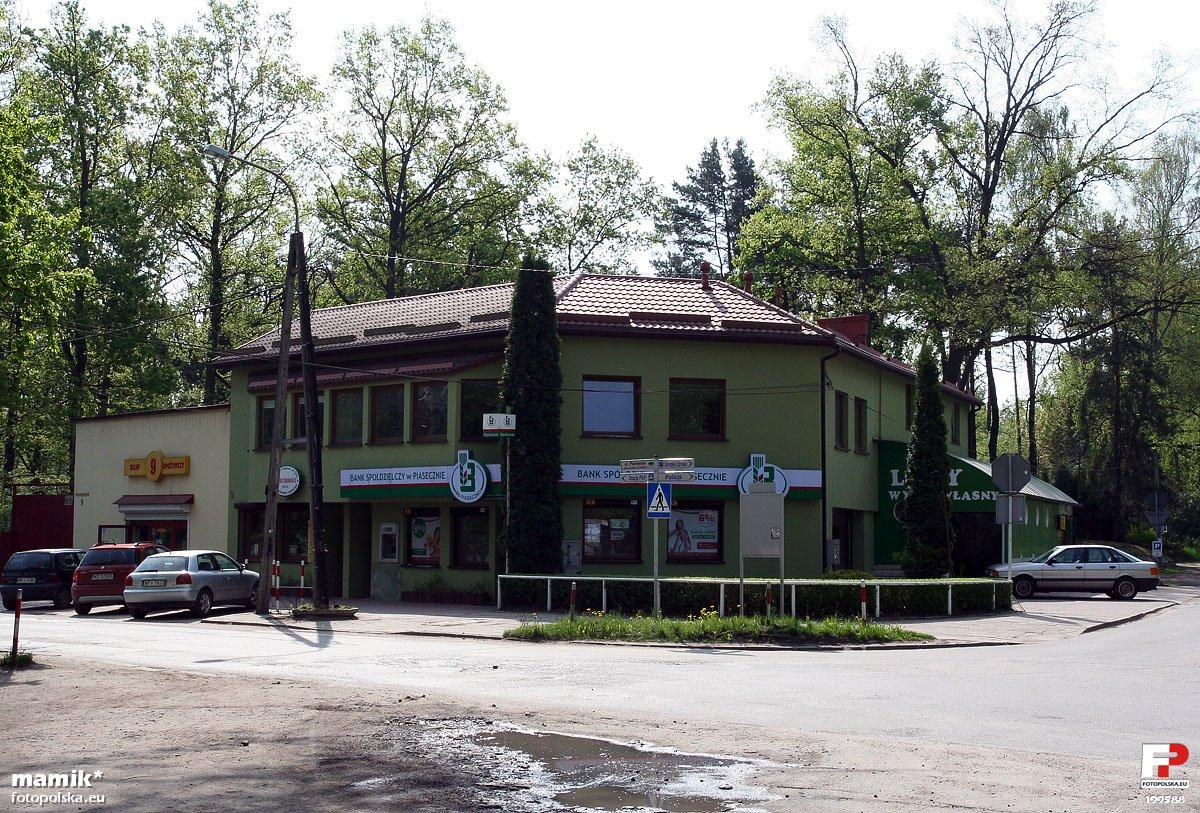
Zalesie Górne shops
