= Sokolniki Suche =

- Village
- Location within Poland
- Coordinates: 51°23′N 20°47′E
- Country: Poland
- Voivodeship: Masovian
- County: Przysucha
- Gmina: Wieniawa
- Population (2023): 304
- SIMC: 0640863

Sokolniki Suche [sɔkɔlˈniki ˈsuxɛ] is a village in the administrative district of Gmina Wieniawa, within Przysucha County, Masovian Voivodeship, in east-central Poland.

On 9 September 2026, a concrete mixer lorry collided into a train at a level crossing located in the village.
