= Czachówek, Masovian Voivodeship =

Czachówek
- Village
- Location within Poland
- Coordinates: 51°58′N 21°5′E
- Country: Poland
- Voivodeship: Masovian
- County: Piaseczno
- Gmina: Góra Kalwaria

Czachówek [t͡ʂaˈxuvɛk] is a village in the administrative district of Gmina Góra Kalwaria, within Piaseczno County, Masovian Voivodeship, in east-central Poland.
