= Nowa Iwiczna =

- Village
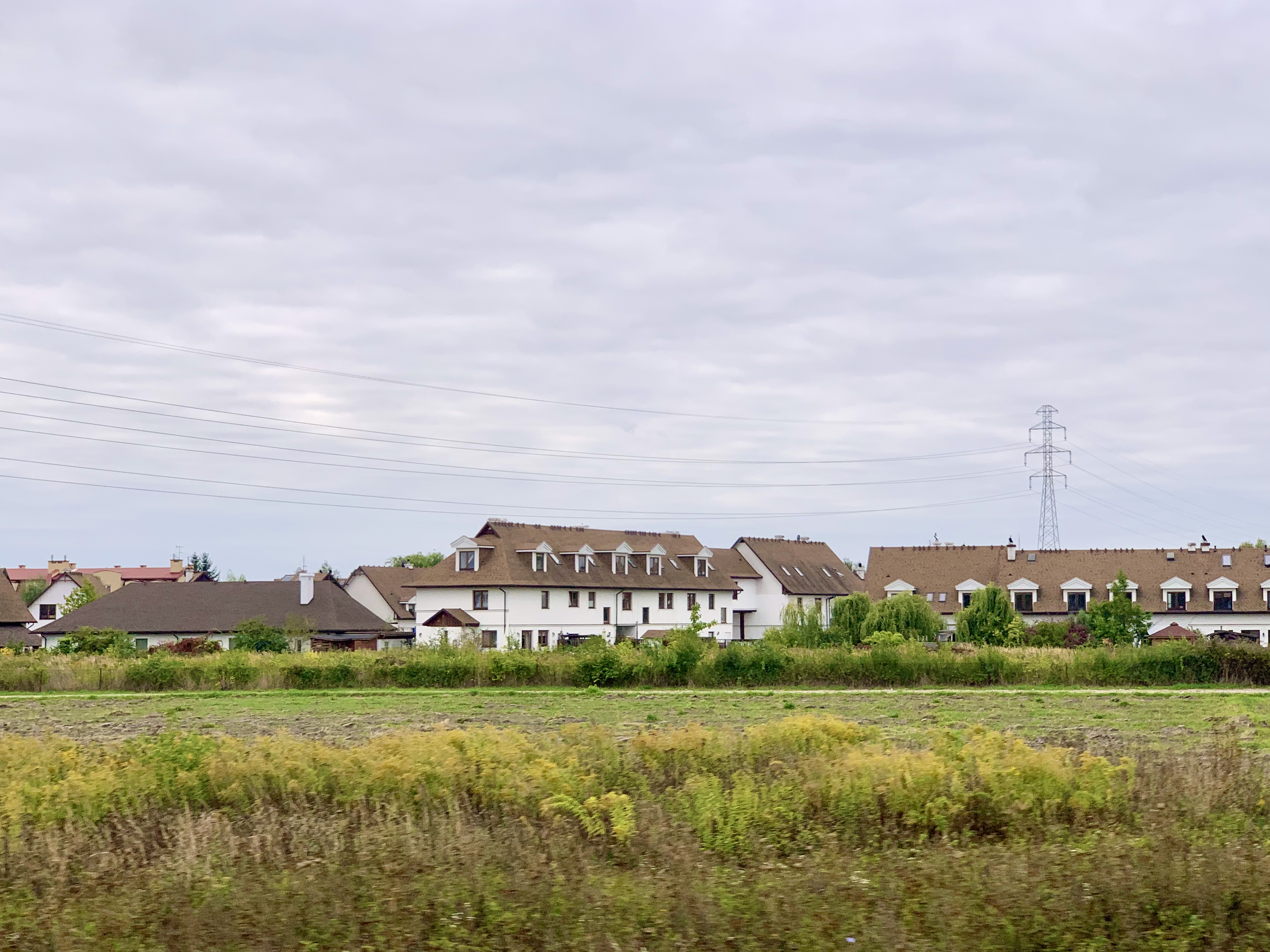

- Location within Poland
- Coordinates: 52°5′N 21°0′E
- Country: Poland
- Voivodeship: Masovian
- County: Piaseczno
- Gmina: Lesznowola
- Population: 3,755 (2,011)
- Time zone: UTC+1 (CET)
  - Summer (DST): UTC+2 (CEST)
- Vehicle registration: WPI
- Website: http://www.nowaiwiczna.info/

Nowa Iwiczna (pronounced [ˈnɔva iˈvit͡ʂna]) is a village in the administrative district of Gmina Lesznowola, within Piaseczno County, Masovian Voivodeship, in the Warsaw metropolitan area, in east-central Poland.
