= Radom Główny railway station =

Railway station in Radom, Poland

Radom Główny
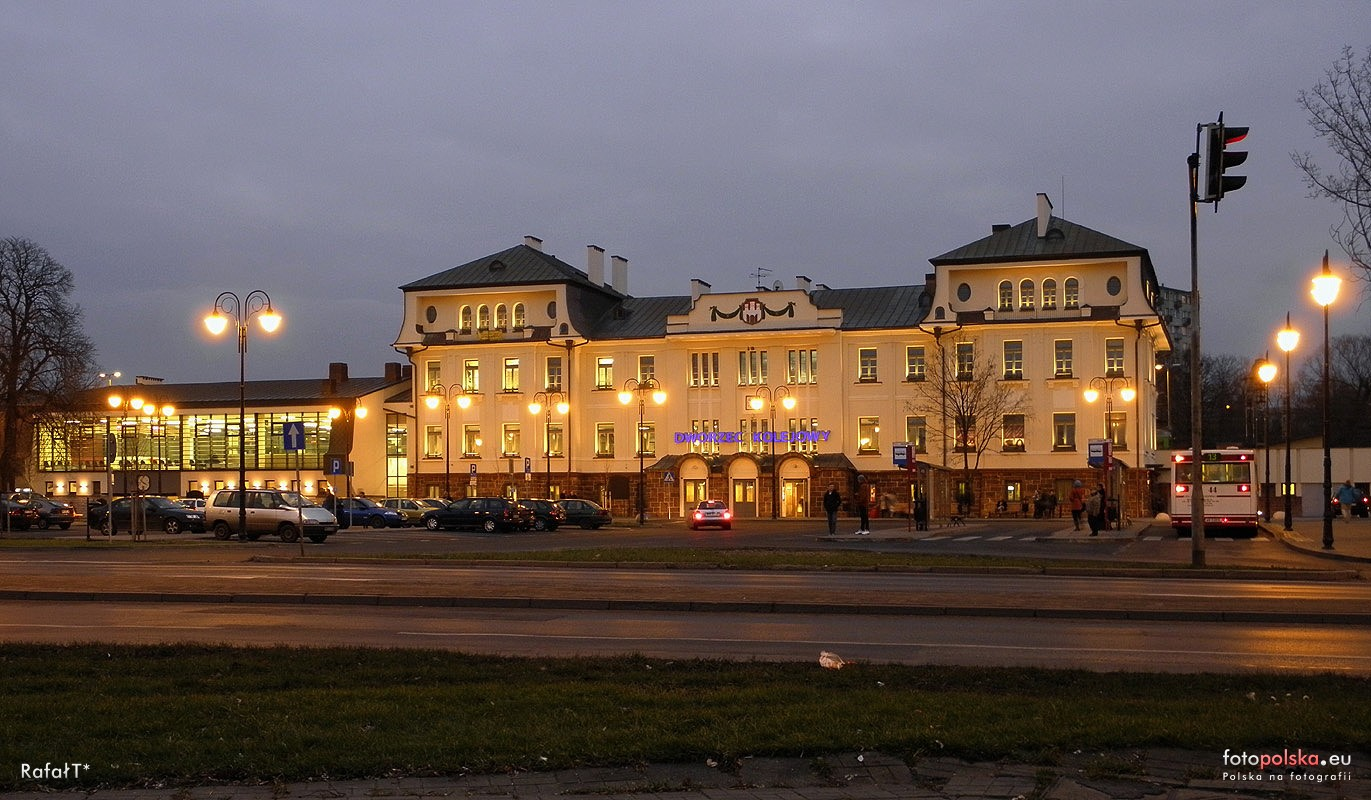

General information
- Location: plac Dworcowy 2, Radom, Masovian; Poland
- Coordinates: 51°23′28″N 21°09′18″E
- System: B
- Owner: Polskie Koleje Państwowe S.A.
- Line: Tomaszów Mazowiecki–Radom railway
- Platforms: 3
- Tracks: 5

Construction
- Structure type: Building: Yes

History
- Opened: 1885

Services
Preceding station	PKP Intercity	Following station
Pionki Zachodnie towards Lublin Główny	IC	Skarżysko-Kamienna towards Kraków Główny
Preceding station	Masovian Railways	Following station
Radom Południowy towards Skarżysko-Kamienna	R8	Radom Gołębiów towards Warszawa Wschodnia
Rajec Poduchowny towards Dęblin	R81	Terminus
Terminus	R82	Radom Potkanów towards Drzewica
Preceding station	ŁKA	Following station
Radom Potkanów towards Łódź Fabryczna	Łódź - Radom	Terminus
Location
- Location within Masovian Voivodeship Location within Poland Location within Europe

Radom Główny, in English Radom Main, is the largest and the most centrally located railway station in Radom, Poland.

== History ==
It was built in 1885 as part of the East–West Iwanogorod – Dąbrowa Górnicza line. The station building was designed by Adolf Schimmelpfennig. The station was named simply Radom until the European railway timetable change on 12 December 2021.

== Location ==
It now stands at the junction of this line and the Warsaw–Kraków line.

== Train services ==
Radom is served by trains of PKP Intercity, Masovian Railways, and Łódź Agglomeration Railway, and is designated as a Category B by PKP.

The station is served by the following service(s) (Intercity):

- Kołobrzeg - Koszalin - Słupsk - Tricity - Iława - Warsaw - Radom - Kielce - Kraków (night train)
- Lublin - Radom - Kielce/CMK - Częstochowa - Opole - Wrocław
- Giżycko - Ełk - Białystok - Warsaw - Radom - Kielce - Kraków
- Lublin - Radom - Kielce - Kraków/Katowice (-Gliwice)
- Warsaw - Radom - Kielce - Kraków
- Warsaw - Radom - Starachowice - Ostrowiec Świętokrzyski - Sandomierz - Tarnobrzeg - Rzeszów - Przemyśl
- Lublin - Radom - Tomaszów Mazowiecki - Łódź - Kalisz - Poznań - Krzyż - Szczecin
- Olsztyn - Działdowo - Warsaw - Kielce - Kraków

And TLK service

Tricity - Iława - Warsaw - Radom - Kielce - Kraków - Zakopane
