= Góra Kalwaria railway station =

Railway station in Góra Kalwaria, Poland

Góra Kalwaria
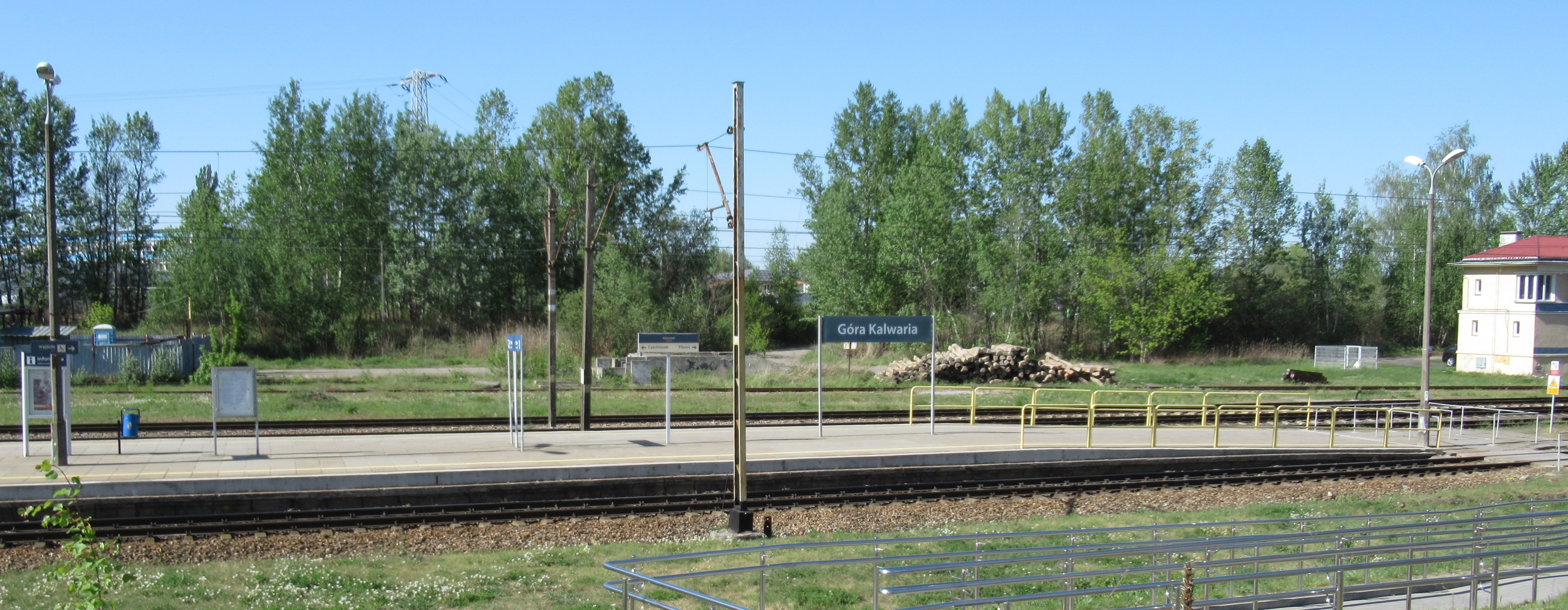

General information
- Location: Góra Kalwaria, Góra Kalwaria, Piaseczno, Masovian; Poland
- Coordinates: 51.9889465°N 21.190796°E
- System: Rail Station
- Owner: Polskie Koleje Państwowe S.A. (PKP)

Services
Preceding station	Masovian Railways	Following station
Terminus	R8	Czachówek Wschodni towards Warszawa Wschodnia
Location

Góra Kalwaria railway station is a railway station at Góra Kalwaria, Piaseczno, Masovian, Poland. It is served by Masovian Railways.
