= Okęcie =

Neighbourhood of Warsaw, Poland

- City Information System area (neighbourhood)
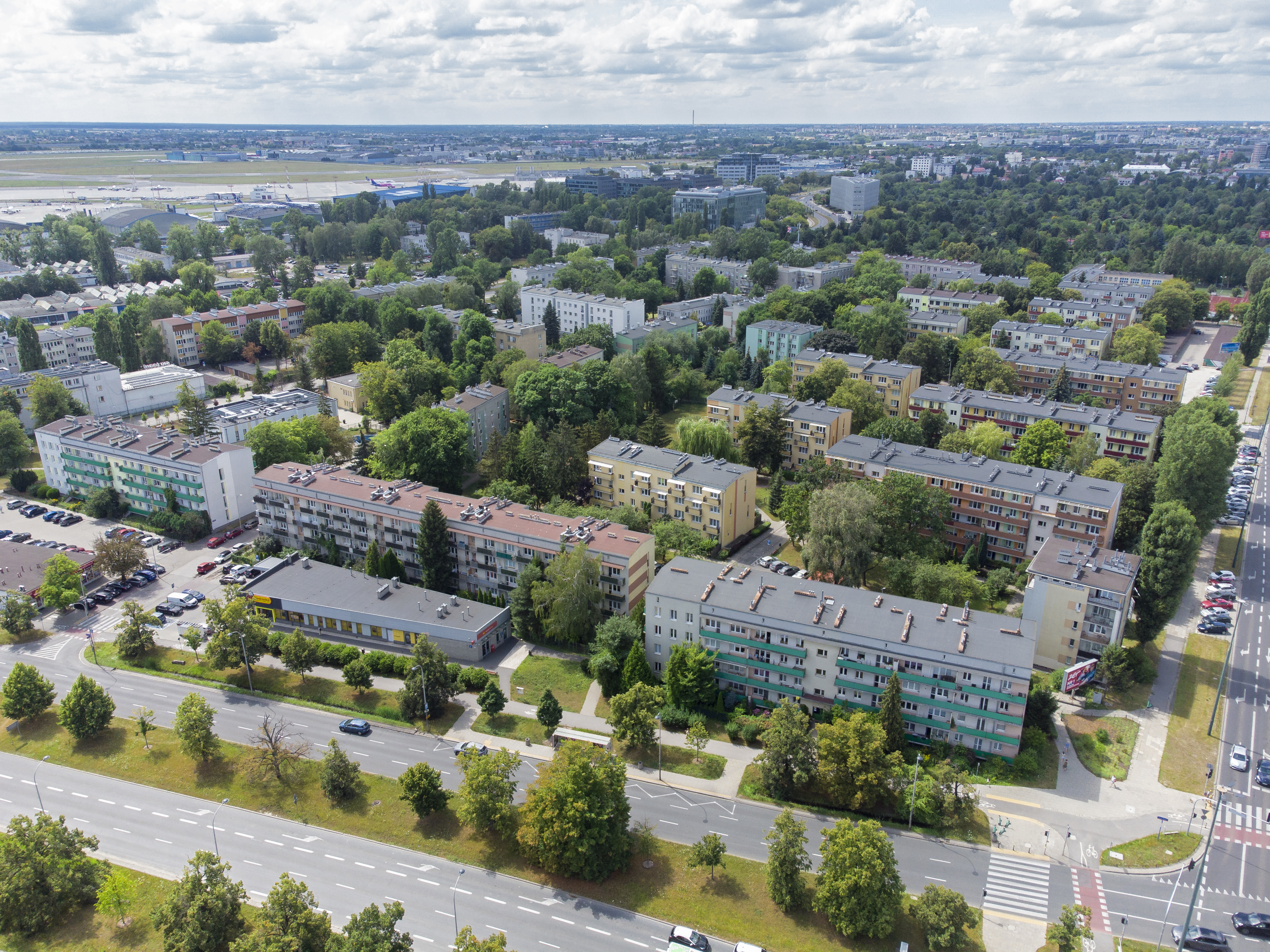
- The housing estate of Okęcie Lotnisko.

- Okęcie within the Włochy district.
- Coordinates: 52°11′N 20°57′E
- Country: Poland
- Voivodeship: Masovian
- City county: Warsaw
- District: Włochy
- Time zone: UTC+1 (CET)
  - Summer (DST): UTC+2 (CEST)
- Area code: +48 22

Okęcie (Polish: [ɔˈkɛɲ.t͡ɕɛ]) is a neighbourhood, and a City Information System area, in Warsaw, Poland, within the Włochy district. Its northern and western portions feature residential areas with apartment buildings, including the housing estates of Jadwisin, Okęcie Lotnisko, and Wieża. The majority of the area of the neighbourhood is dedicated to the Warsaw Chopin Airport, an international airport and central hub for LOT Polish Airlines. In 2024, it was the busiest airport in Poland and the 28th busiest airport in Europe, with 21.3 million passengers in 2024, handling approximately 40% of the country's total air passenger traffic. The area around the airport features factories and warehouses partially dedicated to the aviation industry, as well as the Institute of Aviation, a state research institution.

Okęcie was founded in the 14th century, when it was separated from the southeastern part of Raków. By 1409, the village of Zbarż was also recorded in the area. The later received the Kulm law rights in 1451. In 1883, two military fortifications, known as Fort VI "Okęcie" and Fort VII "Zbarż" were constructed in the area by the Imperial Russian Army, and used until 1913. In 1934, the Warsaw Chopin Airport was opened in the area, becoming the largest airport in the country, and the hub of the LOT Polish Airlines. Numerous factories also developed around the airport. In 1939, Okęcie became the seat of the municipality named after it. During the Second World War, while Warsaw remained under the German occupation, the airport was used for cargo transportation, and as a base for the German Air Force. The area was incorporated into Warsaw in 1951. Between 1958 and 1972, two housing estates, known as Jadwisin and Okęcie Lotnisko, were constructed in the neighbourhood, for a total of around 12,800 residents. The airport was expanded and modernised between the 1960s and 1980s.

== Toponomy ==
The name Okęcie comes from Old Polish term "w zakąciu", meaning in the corner, as the settlement was founded as an extension of the village of Raków, in its southeast corner. Originally, the name was recorded as Zakącie and Okącie, and later also as Okencie.

== History ==
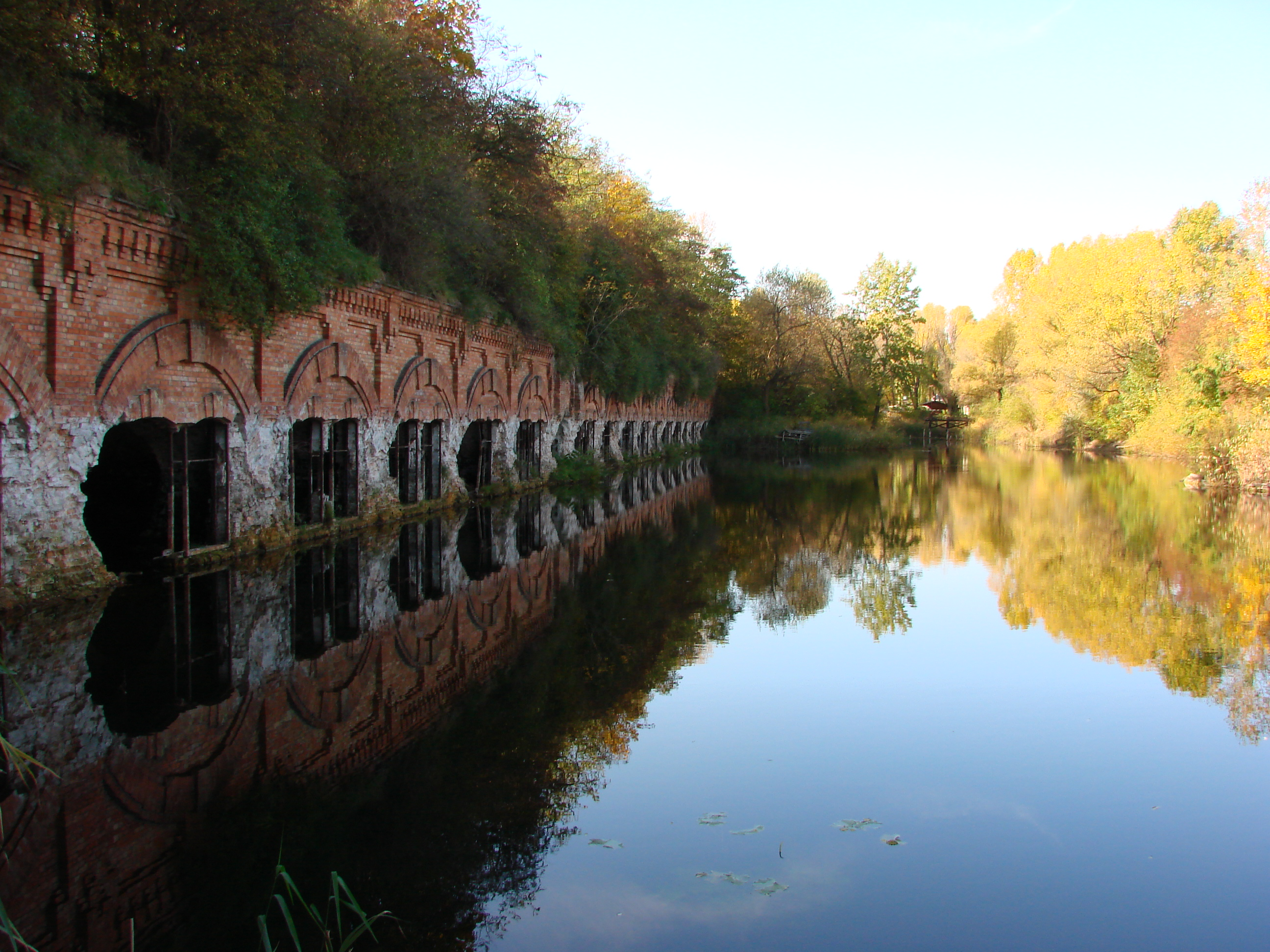
The flooded ruins of barracks of the Fort VII "Zbarż", built near Okęcie and Zbarż in 1888.

In 1232, the village of Raków was first recorded in the area, when it was given to knight Gotard of Służew, by Duke Konrad I of Masovia, the ruler of the Duchy of Masovia. In the 14th century, the village of Okęcie was separated from the southeastern part of Raków, being first attested in records in 1421. It was placed on the Sadurka stream, which flowed through that area until sometime between the 1920s and 1930s, when its course was altered and directed through underground canals, with Służewiec Stream currently being its only remainder. They were owned by the Rakowiecki family, which descended from Gotard of Służew, and was part of the Radwan clan. In the 16th century, the branch owning Okęcie adopted the name Okęcki. Two more villages, Zbarż and Gorzkiewki, were recorded to the southeast of Okęcie, in 1409 and 1422, respectively. They were owned by the Zbarski family. In 1447, Raków was granted the Kulm law rights by Duke Bolesław IV of Warsaw, the ruler of the Duchy of Masovia, with Gorzkiewki and Zbarż also receiving them in 1451. In 1528, the farmlands of Raków and Okęcie measured 6 and 2 lans, which corresponded to around 108 and 36 hectares, respectively. The same year, Gorzkiewki and Zbarż were acquired by the Babicki family. In 1652, Okęcie was bought by Paweł Petrykowski, the parson of Drohiczyn and archdeacon of Pułtusk. Following which, the hamlet of Paluch was founded between Okęcie and Gorzkiewki. The same century, Raków was acquired by magnate and politician Stanisław Warszycki, while Gorzkiewki and Zbarż, became property of Jakub Hieronim Rozdrażewski, the voivode of Inowrocław Voivodeship. The area changed hands over the next centuries, including being owned by Lubomirski, and Plater families, among others. In the 18th century, Paluch was acquired by Arnold Anastazy Byszewski, the lieutenant general of the Crown Army, and the aide-de-camp of King Stanisław August Poniatowski. In the 19th century, Okęcie and Raków were incorporated into the Łabęcki family's landed estate, with new buildings being constructed alongside modern Komitetu Obrony Robotników Street. In 1827, Raków had 185 inhabitants, making it the second largest settlement in the area, after Solipse. Gorzkiewki and Okęcie had 82 and 81 residents, respectively. In 1856, a palace residence was built in Okęcie, for the Bagniewski family, and was demolished in the next century. Following the abolition of serfdom in 1864, Okęcie, Raków, and Paluch were incorporated into the municipality of Skorosze, while Gorzkiewki and Zbarż, into the municipality of Wilanów. Between 1883 and 1888, Forts VI "Okęcie" and VII "Zbarż" were constructed by the Imperial Russian Army near Raków and Okęcie, as part of the city fortifications, known as the Warsaw Fortress. As such, the government heavily restricted construction in their vicinity, hindering the development of the nearby villages. Around that time, Kraków Road (now forming Krakowska Avenue) was built next to the village, connecting Warsaw and Kraków. At the beginning of the 20th century, Raków had 21 households. The village was eventually surpassed in size by the rapidly developing Okęcie, and was subsequently incorporated into it in the late 1920s. The military fortifications were retired and partially demolished in 1913. In 1929, the Okęcie Warsaw association football club was founded in Okęcie, with the homefield located at 1 Radarowa Street since 1963. Between the 1920s and 1930s, the course of the Sadurka stream, which flowed through Okęcie, was artificially altered to bypass the area.

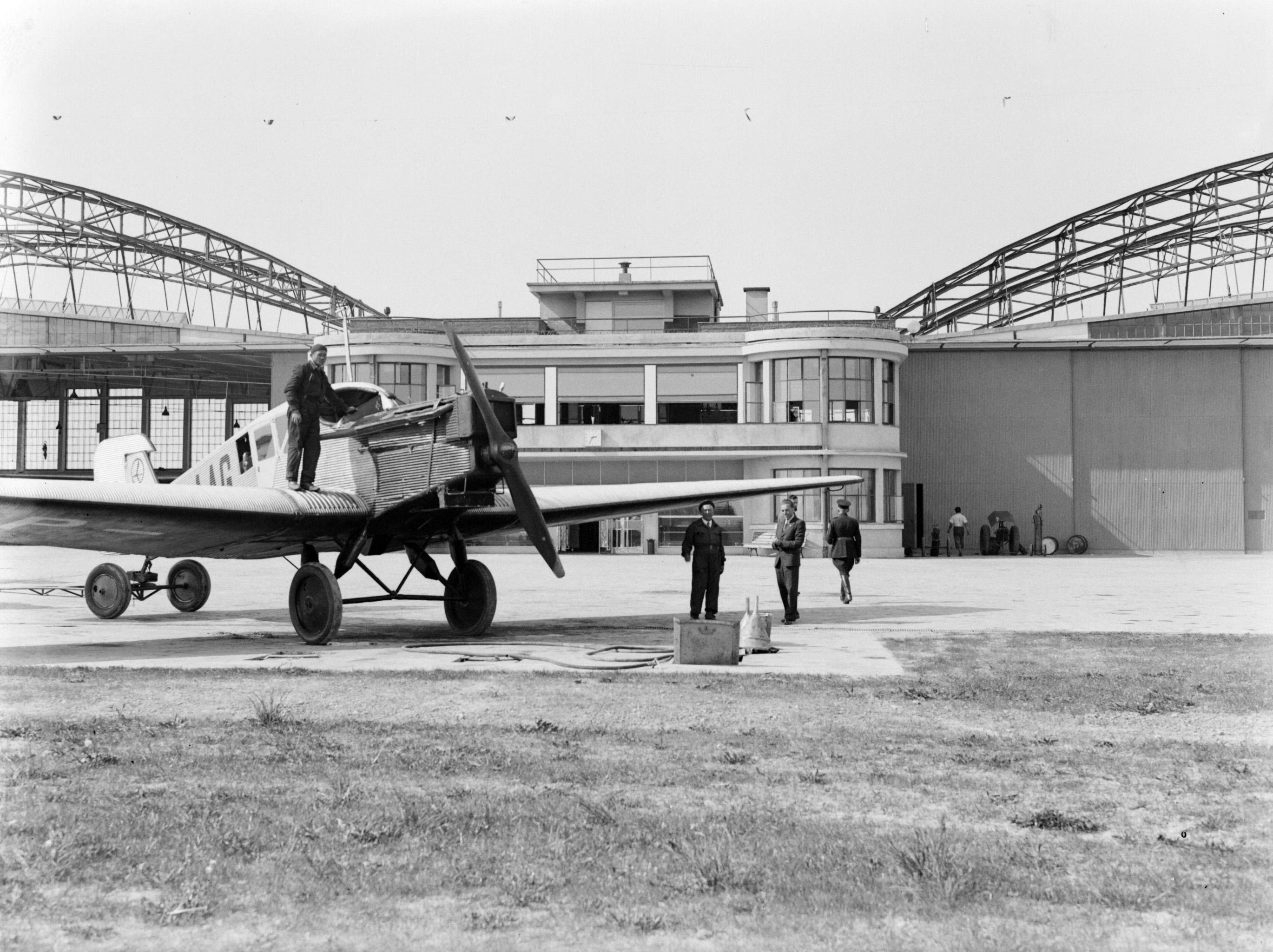
The Warsaw Chopin Airport in Okęcie in 1934.

In 1923, tram tracks were constructed alongside Kraków Road, connecting Okęcie with Warsaw. In 1925, the government acquired 285 ha of land from Okęcie, Paluch, and Gorzkiewki, for the development of the Warsaw Chopin Airport, known until 2001 as the Warsaw Okęcie Airport, and another 200 ha for the nearby infrastructure. Its construction began in 1933, and it was opened on 29 April 1934, becoming the largest airport in Poland. It included two dirt intersecting runways, measuring 1,470 and 1,270 m (4,822.84 and 4,166.67 ft). It was originally only planned as a military airbase. However, upon its opening, it also replaced Mokotów Aerodrome as a passenger and cargo airport. It also became the central hub for the LOT Polish Airlines, and the home base of the 1st Aviation Regiment of the Polish Armed Forces. Around the airport were also developed factories catering to the aviation industry were also developed, such as Doświadczalne Warsztaty Lotnicze (Experimental Aeronautical Workshops) and Państwowe Zakłady Lotnicze (State Aviation Works), and research institutions, such as the Institute of Aviation. Additionally, in 1932, a weather station was also opened next to the airport. In 1934, Żwirki i Wigury Street was opened, providing a direct connection between the airport and the Downtown Warsaw. In 1935, a 20-metre-tall steel column, topped with a sculpture of three eagles, was unveiled at the airport. It was dedicated to Józef Piłsudski, a 20th-century statesman who served as the Chief of State from 1918 to 1922, and the Marshal of Poland from 1920 to 1935. The monument was destroyed in 1944. The same year, the Warszawa Okęcie railway station was opened near the airport. It formed a connection with the Warszawa Aleje Jerozolimskie station near Jerusalem Avenue, predominantly used by cargo trains. The line passed through Okęcie, including stations Wyczółki and Lotnisko, and was closed down in 1966, except its terminal stations. Additionally, between 1937 and 1939, a railway line operated between stations in Wyczółki and Paluch, with a stop at the factories of Państwowe Zakłady Lotnicze. On 1 April 1939, Okęcie became the seat of a new municipality, named after it, which encompassed the surrounding area.

The airport was bombed on 1 September 1939 by the German Air Force, during the first hours of the German invasion of Poland, which began the Second World War. It was captured on 8 September, and following repairs, it began to be used by the German Air Force. On 12 September, a group of soldiers from the 360th Infantry Regiment of the Polish Armed Forces, led by lieutenant colonel Jakub Chmura, together with two tank companies, attacked German positions in Okęcie. It aimed to identify enemy forces on the western outskirts of Warsaw, destroy German defenses and take prisoners. The attack was planned to begin at 3:00 am. However, due to delays with troops arriving at their position, it began at 7:00 am in daylight. Perhaps fearing that, due to the delay, colonel Marian Porwit would call off the attack, Chmura did not give the expected signal, according to which the 2nd Battalion of the 41st Infantry Regiment was to carry out a diversion attack from Ochota, and the heavy artillery was to support the attack on Okęcie. The, unit was divided into three groups. The left wing, commanded by Czesław Chamerski, and supported by half of a tank battalion, captured the Służewiec Racecourse with light German resistance. Then it headed to the Fort VI "Okęcie", being pushed back by heavy fire from fortified German soldiers, eventually retreating at 11:00 am. The Polish side suffered around 80 dead and wounded soldiers, which was around of its 45% forces. The right wing, commanded by Leon Radzikowski and Mieczysław Bułatowicz, headed to Fort M alongside Racławicka Street, where they found a Polish Infantry platoon, which was cut off from communications for three days. Further advance was halted due to enemy fire from Żwirki i Wigury Street. In response, they opened fire from their positions at Racławicka Street, and were eventually ordered to retreat in the evening. The main forces, consisting of two infantry companies and a group of tanks, led by Chmura, captured Zbarż and the airport, pushing back light German resistance. They continued the attack towards Załuski, however, while crossing an empty field, they were fired from both the west and the south, suffering heavy losses, including their commander, Chmura. Around 11:00 am, the Polish forces retreated. In total, all three groups suffered around 280 soldiers being killed, captured, or wounded, and lost 7 tanks. On the same day, the German officers committed their first mass murder against the population of Warsaw. In the early morning hours, a Wehrmacht officer (likely a major) was killed on the Kraków Road. According to one version, he was shot dead by a local, while according to another, the car the officer was travelling in was mistakenly shot down by a German aircraft. After this incident, Wehrmacht soldiers conducted a roundup in Okęcie, capturing several dozen men in nearby houses, and taking them to the courtyard of the factory of Polskie Zakłady Lotnicze, where they were executed. At least 25 people were killed, of whom 11 were identified. One person survived, being mistaken for dead. On 27 September, generals Tadeusz Kutrzeba, and colonel Aleksander Pragłowski, officers of the Polish Armed Forces, met with colonel general Johannes Blaskowitz, the commander of the 8th Army of the Wehrmacht, in the factory of Polskie Zakłady Lotnicze in Okęcie, which served as its command centre. The Polish delegation informed Blaskowitz of the intentions to capitulate the city, and began the negotiations of the terms. Polish military and civilian representatives returned the next day, to finalise the details of the capitulation agreement, which was then signed by Blaskowitz and Kutrzeba, on 13:15, resigning the city to German occupation. On 5 October 1939, Adolf Hitler, the dictator of Germany, arrived by plane at the airport to receive the victory parade in Warsaw.

During the occupation, the airport was used for cargo transportation, and a new concrete runway was constructed there. A portion of the 1st division of the Air Fleet 6 of the German Air Force, was stationed at the airport, equipped with Junkers Ju 87 dive bomber aircraft. In 1944, the airport also had 56 anti-aircraft guns. Additionally, from 1942 to 1943, the labour camps for Jewish civilian operated in the factories in Okęcie and Raków, later using Soviet prisoners of war in 1944. In 1943, Okęcie had a population of 10,699 people, while Zbarż and Gorzkiewki had 237 and 136 residents respectively. On 1 August 1944, at 17:00, codenamed as the W-Hour, a small company of the 7th Infantry Regiment of the Home Army, led by Romuald Jakubowski, attacked the airport. The plans to attack were cancelled an hour prior to the event; however, the group did not receive the new orders in time. The soldiers charged from Zbarż, advancing across an open field, where they came under fierce German machine-gun fire, with Jakubowski dying in the attack. The group was ordered to retreat. However, a German armoured car drove to cut them off, firing at the retreating soldiers. Of the 180 attackers, approximately 120 were killed. The survivors scattered, with a small number successfully travelling to Mokotów. In October 1944, shortly before retreating from the city, German officers damaged the runway and taxiways and destroyed the air traffic control tower. The airport was reopened for civilian use in March 1945.

In 1939, the Okęcie Cemetery was created next to Fort VI, as a burial place for the Polish soldiers fallen during the invasion of Poland, and later in 1944, also those fallen in the Warsaw Uprising. The cemetery was closed down in 1956, and the bodies were exhumated and moved to the Powązki Military Cemetery.

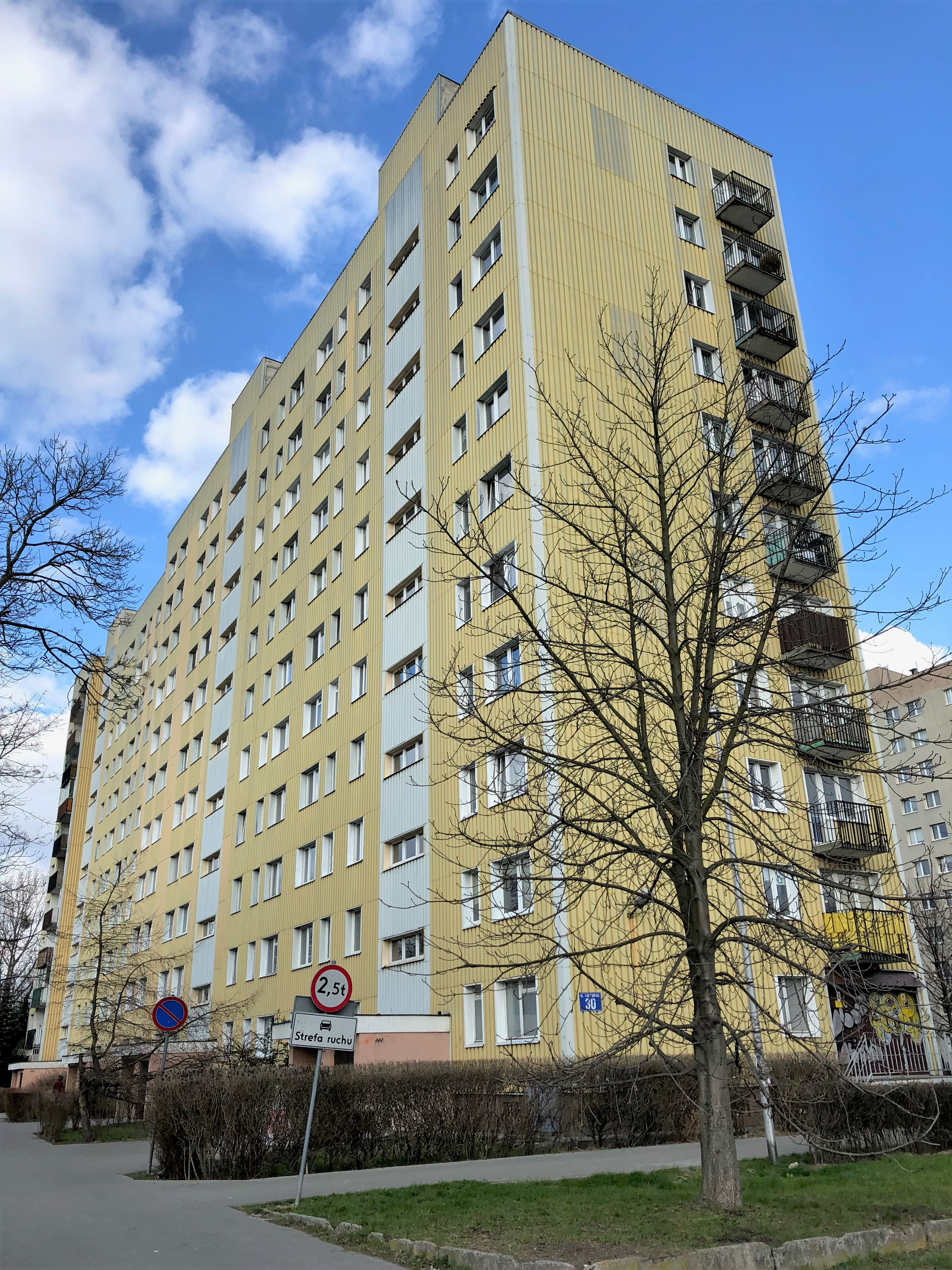
One of the apartment buildings built in the 1980s, in the neighbourhood of Jadwisin.

On 15 May 1951, the area was incorporated into the city of Warsaw. Between 1952 and 1961, the housing estate of Okęcie Lotnisko was developed between Hynka, Żwirki i Wigury, Komitetu Obrony Robotników, and Astronautów Streets, on an area of 12.3 ha. Designed for 6,000 residents, it consisted of multiple 4-storey-tall apartment buildings, constructed using the large panel system technique. The neighbourhood was originally envisioned to house workers of the nearby airport and the aviation industry. Additionally, between 1952 and 1953, three apartment buildings were constructed at the corner of Flia and Łopuszańska Streets, forming the neighbourhood of Okęcie II. Currently, it is located within the boundaries of the City Information System area of Raków. Between 1962 and 1972, another housing estate of apartment buildings was developed between Pierwszego Sierpnia Street, Sulmierzycka Street, Lechicka Street, and Krakowska Avenue. Originally named Okęcie-Pola, it was later renamed to Jadwisin. It was developed for around 6,800, with its buildings being built using the large panel system technique. The neighbourhood was further expanded throughout the 1970s and 1980s, with new buildings constructed alongside Pierwszego Sierpnia Street. It also included a small park, later named Marek Kotański Park.

The Warsaw Chopin Airport was expanded between 1962 and 1969, including the construction of an international transport hub, an air traffic control tower, a passenger hall, technical and administrative structures, and cargo and postal infrastructure. Two new main asphalt runways measuring 3000 m (9842.5 ft), as well as an auxiliary runway measuring 2000 m (6561.7 ft), were also developed. The new domestic transport hub was opened in 1975, and a new terminal for arriving passengers was opened in 1978. In 1980, the runways were extended and modernised. In 1992, a new cargo and postal terminal hub was opened. Its construction erased last structures of Gorzkiewki. It was again expanded in 2017, becoming the largest cargo airport terminal in the country.

On 19 December 1962, a Vickers Viscount turboprop airliner operated by LOT Polish Airlines on a flight from Brussels to Warsaw, crashed on landing at the Warsaw Chopin Airport, with all of its 33 passengers and crewmembers dying in the accident. Another major aviation accident in Okęcie took place on 14 March 1980, when a Ilyushin Il-62 jetliner crashed crashed next to the airport and Fort VI, after aborting a landing and attempting to go-around. It was operated on a flight from New York City to Warsaw. All of its 87 passengers and crewmembers died in the accident. It was caused by the disintegration of a turbine disc in one of the plane's engines, leading to uncontained engine failure.

In 1962, two railway stations were opened on a line between Warszawa Aleje Jerozolimskie and Warszawa Okęcie, including Warszawa Służewiec at Logarytmiczna Street, and Warszawa Rakowiec at Grójecka Street. They formed part of the railway line between Warsaw West and Kraków Main. In 2008, the Warszawa Żwirki i Wigury was opened as part of the line, between the aforementioned stations, and located near Żwirki and Wigury Street. In 2012, the Warsaw Chopin Airport railway station was opened in the airport complex.

Between 1979 and 1987, the Catholic Church of Our Lady of Loreto was built at 4A Hynka Street. The building also began operating the Okęcie Cemetery, which was reopened in 1990. With an area of 0.3 ha, it is currently one of the largest burial grounds in the city. Between 1997 and 2000, a small housing estate of apartment buildings, known as Wieża, was developed at the corner of Lechicka and Radarowa Streets. On 19 May 2004, the Włochy district was subdivided into the City Information System areas, with Okęcie becoming one of them. It also included Zbarż as well as most of the historical area of Raków. The airport was divided between the areas of Okęcie, Paluch, and Załuski. In 2018, the Saint George the Victorious Church, a Polish Orthodox cathedral was opened at 2 Hynka Street.

== Characteristics ==
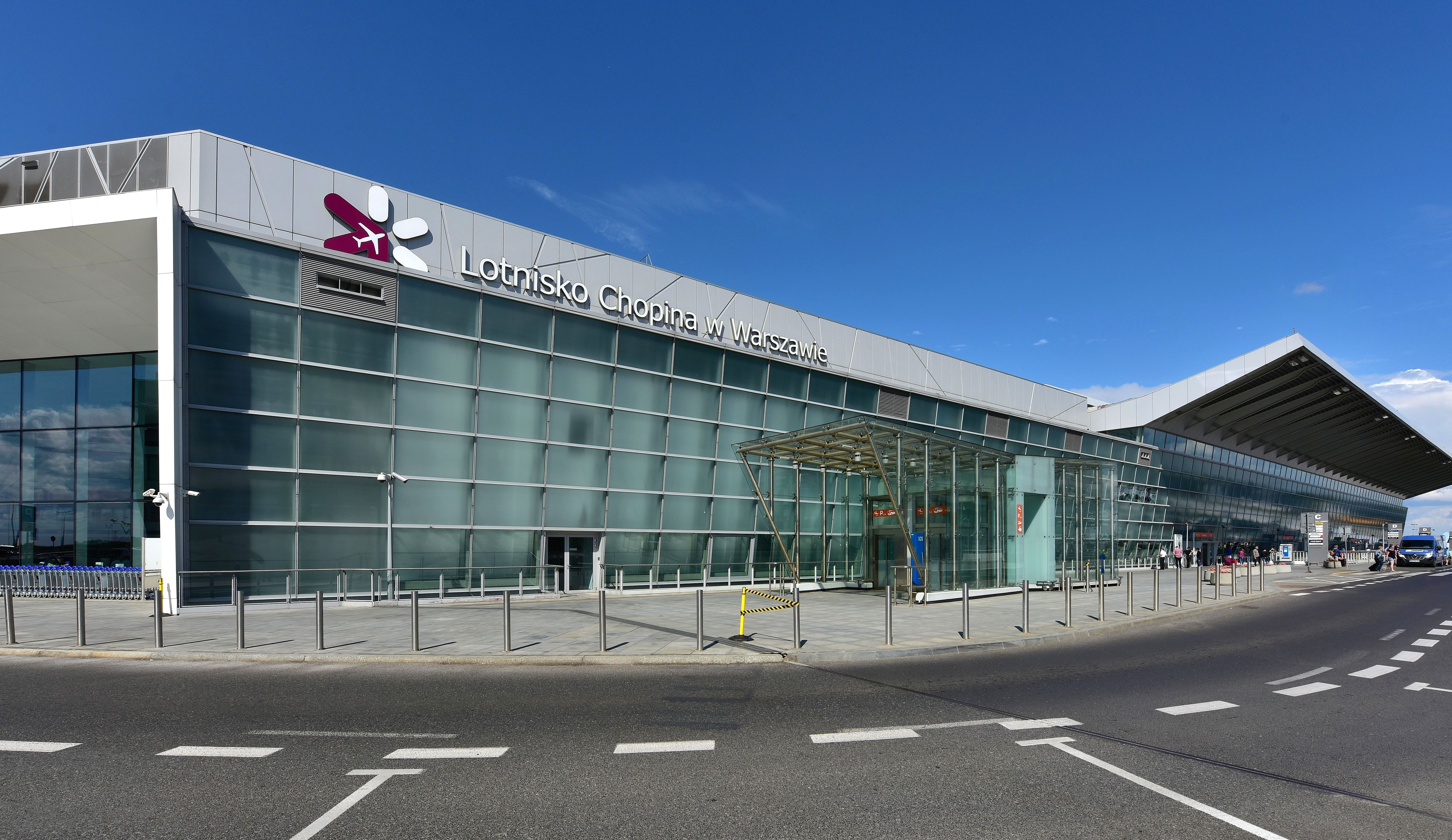
The main terminal of the Warsaw Chopin Airport.

The northern and western parts of the neighbourhood feature multifamily residential areas with apartment buildings. This includes the housing estates of Okęcie Lotnisko, located between Hynka, Żwirki i Wigury, Komitetu Obrony Robotników, and Astronautów Streets; Jadwisin, located between Pierwszego Sierpnia Street, Sulmierzycka Street, Lechicka Street, and Krakowska Avenue; and Wieża, located at the corner of Lechicka and Radarowa Streets. Additionally, the area near Pierwszego Sierpnia Street features a small recreational green space, known as the Marek Kotański Park. Furthermore, as the City Information System area, Okęcie is additionally subdivided into several more neighbourhoods, including: Kolonia Stasin and Raków in the southeast, Jadwisin, Kolonia Rakowiec and Kolonia Okęcinek in the north, and Zbarż in the east.

The majority of the area of the neighbourhood is dedicated to the Warsaw Chopin Airport, which is an international airport. In 2024, it was the busiest airport in Poland and the 28th busiest airport in Europe, with 21.3 million passengers in 2024, handling approximately 40% of the country's total air passenger traffic. It is a central hub for LOT Polish Airlines as well as a base for Enter Air and Wizz Air. The airport includes two intersecting asphalt runways, with lengths of 3,690 m (12,106 ft) and 2,800 m (9,186 ft), respectively, as well as two passenger terminals, a cargo terminal, and a dedicated railway station. The area around the airport features factories and warehouses, partially dedicated to the aviation industry, such as buildings of Państwowe Zakłady Lotnicze (State Aviation Works), as well as the Institute of Aviation, a state research institution.

The northern and eastern boundaries of Okęcie are marked by the railway tracks of the line between Warsaw West and Kraków Main stations. It has four railway stations located within the neighbourhood, including Warszawa Okęcie, Warszawa Rakowiec, Warszawa Służewiec, and Warszawa Żwirki i Wigury. The neighbourhood is also crossed by the tram tracks alongside Krakowska Avenue.

Okęcie includes three places of worship, the Church of Our Lady of Loreto at 4A Hynka Street, which belongs to the Catholic denomination, the Saint George the Victorious Church, a Polish Orthodox cathedral, located at 2 Hynka Street, and a Kingdom Hall of Jehovah's Witnesses at 17 Krakowiaków Street. The neighbourhood also features the Okęcie Cemetery, located on Leonidasa Street, which, with an area of 0.3 ha, is one of the largest burial grounds in Warsaw. Furthermore, the area also features two historical retired military fortifications, dating to 1883, including Fort VI "Okęcie" at 6 Lipowczana Street, and Fort VII "Zbarż" near Bennetta Street. It also includes a historic manor house built for the Schneider family in 1888, located at 11 Pierwszego Sierpnia Street. Additionally, Okęcie has two small ponds, Zbarż Pond near Wirażowa Street, and Sadurka near Komitetu Obrony Robotników Street.

The Okęcie Warsaw association football club operates in the neighbourhood, with its homefield located at 1 Radarowa Street.

== Location and boundaries ==
Okęcie is a City Information System area in Warsaw, located in the northeastern portion of the Włochy district. Its western, northern, and eastern boundaries are approximately determined by Mineralna Street, Działkowa Street, Krakowiaków Street, Flisa Street, Łopuszańska Street, Krakowska Avenue, and the railway line no. 8. Its southern boundary crosses through the Warsaw Chopin Airport. The neighbourhood borders Raków and Szczęśliwice to the northwest, Rakowiec and Wyględów to the north, Służewiec and Wyczółki to the east, Paluch and Załuski to the south, and Opacz Wielka and Salomea to the east. Its northern and eastern boundaries form the district's border with Mokotów and Ursynów.
