= Paluch, Warsaw =

Neighbourhood of Warsaw, Poland

Paluch
- City Information System area (neighbourhood)
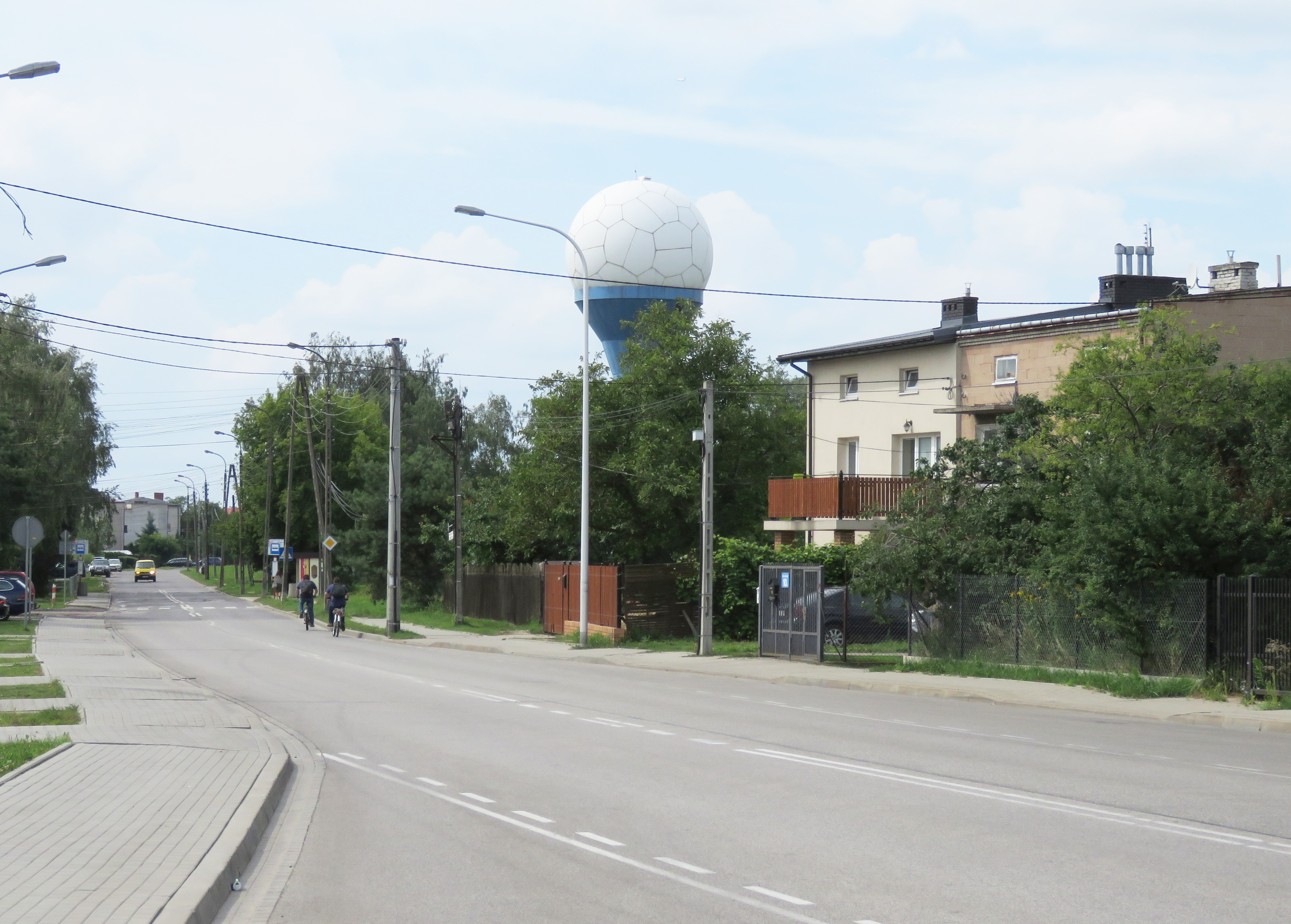
- Houses on Na Skraju Street in Paluch.

- Paluch within the Włochy district.
- Coordinates: 52°09′13.64″N 20°58′15.64″E
- Country: Poland
- Voivodeship: Masovian
- City county: Warsaw
- District: Włochy
- Time zone: UTC+1 (CET)
  - Summer (DST): UTC+2 (CEST)
- Area code: +48 22

Paluch (Polish: [ˈpa.lux]) is a neighbourhood, and a City Information System area, in Warsaw, Poland, within the Włochy district. The area is sparsely populated, with a few houses in its southwest corner, alongside Na Skraju Street. It features the southeastern portion of the Warsaw Chopin Airport, including a part of one of its two runways, and the cargo terminal hub, as well as the cargo area of the Warszawa Okęcie railway station.

In 1422, the village of Gorzkiewki was recorded in the area, and in 1451, it was granted the Kulm law privileges. In 1652, the hamlet of Paluch was also founded nearby. In 1934, the Warsaw Chopin Airport was opened in the area, becoming the largest airport in the country, and the hub of the LOT Polish Airlines. During the Second World War, while Warsaw remained under the German occupation, the airport was used for cargo transportation and as a base for the German Air Force. The airport was expanded and modernised between the 1960s and 1980s. In 1992, a new cargo terminal was opened at the airport, replacing the last remaining structures of Gorzkiewki.

== History ==
In 1422, the village of Gorzkiewki was recorded in the area, to the south of Okęcie and Zbarż. It was owned by the Zbarski family. In 1451, Gorzkiewki was granted the Kulm law rights by Duke Bolesław IV of Warsaw, the ruler of the Duchy of Masovia. In 1528, Gorzkiewki and Zbarż were acquired by the Babicki family, and later became property of Jakub Hieronim Rozdrażewski, the voivode of Inowrocław Voivodeship. In 1652, Okęcie was bought by Paweł Petrykowski, the parson of Drohiczyn and archdeacon of Pułtusk, following which, the hamlet of Paluch was founded on its farmlands, to the south from the village. In the 18th century, Paluch was acquired by Arnold Anastazy Byszewski, the lieutenant general of the Crown Army, and the aide-de-camp of King Stanisław August Poniatowski. In 1827, Gorzkiewki had 82 inhabitants. Following the abolition of serfdom in 1864, the area was incorporated into the municipality of Wilanów. In 1883, the Fort VII "Zbarż" was constructed by the Imperial Russian Army to the north of Gorzkiewki, as part of the city fortifications, known as the Warsaw Fortress. The government heavily restricted construction in its vicinity, hindering the development of the nearby villages. The military fortifications were retired and partially demolished in 1913. Currently, it is located within the City Information System area of Okęcie.

In 1925, the government acquired 285 ha of land from Okęcie, Paluch, and Gorzkiewki, for the development of the Warsaw Chopin Airport, known until 2001 as the Warsaw Okęcie Airport, and another 200 ha for the nearby infrastructure. Its construction began in 1933, and it was opened on 29 April 1934, becoming the largest airport in Poland. It included two dirt intersecting runways, measuring 1,470 and 1,270 m (4,822.84 and 4,166.67 ft). It was originally only planned as a military airbase. However, upon its opening, it also replaced Mokotów Aerodrome as a passenger and cargo airport. It also became the central hub for the LOT Polish Airlines, and the home base of the 1st Aviation Regiment of the Polish Armed Forces. In 1932, a weather station was also opened next to the airport. In 1934, the Warszawa Okęcie railway station was opened near the airport. It formed a connection with the Warszawa Aleje Jerozolimskie station near Jerusalem Avenue, predominantly used by cargo trains. The same year, Żwirki i Wigury Street was also opened, providing a direct connection between the airport and the Downtown Warsaw. In 1935, a factory complex of Państwowe Zakłady Lotnicze (State Aviation Works) was opened in Paluch, next to the airport, manufacturing civilian and military airplanes. In 1938, it employed 3610 people, and in 1939, it supplied the Polish Armed Forces with around 700 aircraft. A company town was founded in Paluch for the employees of the factory, with 144 houses. From 1937 to 1939, a railway station operated in Paluch, as part of a short line to Wyczółki, which featured further railway connections. It included a station at the factory of Państwowe Zakłady Lotnicze in Okęcie. On 1 April 1939, Gorzkiewki and Paluch were incorporated into the municipality of Okęcie.

The airport was bombed on 1 September 1939 by the German Air Force, during the first hours of the invasion of Poland, which began the Second World War. It was captured on 8 September, and following repairs, it began to be used by the German Air Force. On 12 September, a group of soldiers from the 360th Infantry Regiment of the Polish Armed Forces, led by lieutenant colonel Jakub Chmura, together with two tank companies, attacked German positions in Okęcie and at the airport. It aimed to identify enemy forces on the western outskirts of Warsaw, destroy German defences and take prisoners. The attack was planned to begin at 3:00 am. However, due to delays with troops arriving at their position, it began at 7:00 am in daylight. Perhaps fearing that, due to the delay, colonel Marian Porwit would call off the attack, Chmura did not give the expected signal, according to which the 2nd Battalion of the 41st Infantry Regiment was to carry out a diversive attack from Ochota, and the heavy artillery was to support the attack on Okęcie. The attackers were divided into three groups. The main forces, consisting of two infantry companies and a group of tanks, led by Chmura, captured Zbarż and the airport, pushing back a light German resistance. They continued the attack towards Załuski, however, while crossing an empty field, they were fired on from both the west and the south, suffering heavy losses, including their commander, Chmura. Around 11:00 am, the Polish forces retreated. While under the German occupation, the airport was used for cargo transportation, and a new concrete runway was constructed there. A portion of the 1st division of the Air Fleet 6 of the German Air Force, was stationed at the airport, equipped with Junkers Ju 87 dive bomber aircraft. In 1944, the airport also had 56 anti-aircraft guns. In 1943, Gorzkiewki was inhabited by 237 people. On 1 August 1944, at 17:00, codenamed as the W-Hour, a small company of the 7th Infantry Regiment of the Home Army, led by Romuald Jakubowski, attacked the airport. The plans to attack were cancelled an hour prior to the event; however, the group did not receive the new orders in time. The soldiers charged from Zbarż, advancing across an open field, where they came under fierce German machine-gun fire, with Jakubowski dying in the attack. The group was ordered to retreat. However, a German armoured car drove to cut them off, firing at the retreating soldiers. Of the 180 attackers, approximately 120 were killed. The survivors scattered, with a small number successfully travelling to Mokotów. In October 1944, shortly before retreating from the city, German officers damaged the runway and taxiways and destroyed the air traffic control tower. The airport was opened for civilian use in March 1945.

On 15 May 1951, the airport, as well as Gorzkiewki and Plauch, were incorporated into the city of Warsaw.

The Warsaw Chopin Airport was expanded between 1962 and 1969, including the construction of a new main runway and taxiways, as well as technical and administrative structures and cargo and postal infrastructure. In 1980, the runways were extended and modernised. In 1992, a new cargo and postal terminal hub was opened. It construction erased last structures of Gorzkiewki. It was again expanded in 2017, becoming the largest cargo airport terminal in the country.

On 19 December 1962, a Vickers Viscount turboprop airliner operated by LOT Polish Airlines on a flight from Brussels to Warsaw, crashed on landing at the Warsaw Chopin Airport, with all of its 33 passengers and crew dying in the accident. Another major aviation accident took place on 14 March 1980, when a Ilyushin Il-62 jetliner crashed crashed next to the airport and Fort VI, after aborting a landing and attempting to go-around. It was operated on a flight from New York City to Warsaw. All of its 87 passengers and crew died in the accident. It was caused by the disintegration of a turbine disc in one of the plane's engines, leading to uncontained engine failure.

On 19 May 2004, the Włochy district was subdivided into the City Information System areas, with Paluch becoming one of them.

Between 2010 and 2013, the expressway S2 was built crossing through Paluch, as part of the ring road system around Warsaw.

== Characteristics ==
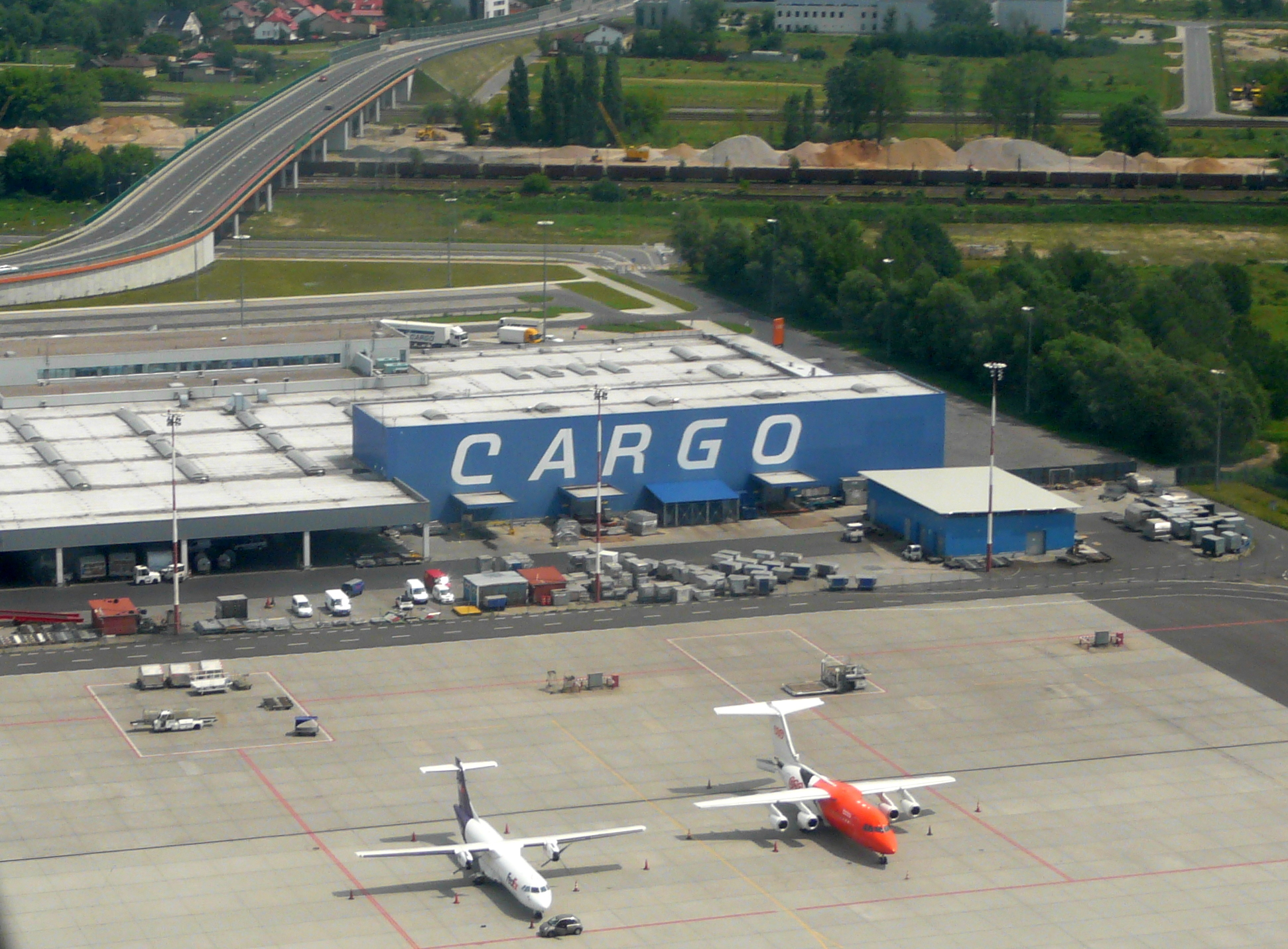
The cargo terminal of the Warsaw Chopin Airport.

Paluch is a sparsely populated area, with a few houses in its southwest corner, alongside Na Skraju Street. Its northeastern part features a portion of the Warsaw Chopin Airport, the largest international airport in Poland, including a part of one of its two runways, and the cargo terminal hub. Nearby, it also includes the cargo area of the Warszawa Okęcie railway station. The neighbourhood is also crossed by the expressway S2, forming a part of the ring road system around Warsaw.

== Location and boundaries ==
Paluch is a City Information System area in Warsaw, located in the southeastern portion of the Włochy district. Its boundaries are approximately determined by railway line no. 8 to the east, Czempińska Street, Kinetyczna Street, Działkowa Street, and Na Skraju Street to the south. Its eastern boundary is marked in a straight line to the northeast from the intersection of Okrężna and Na Skraju Streets, while its northern boundary crosses the Warsaw Chopin Airport. The neighbourhood borders Okęcie to the north, Grabów and Wyczółki to the east, the municipality of Raszyn, with villages of Jaworowa and Rybie, to the south, and Załuski to the west. Its eastern boundary forms the district's border with Ursynów, while its southern boundary marks the city border with Pruszków County.

Additionally, the City Information System also subdivides a portion of the neighbourhood into a subarea of Gorzkiewki, with its boundary marked by the railway line no. 8, and across the Warsaw Chopin Airport, between the cargo terminal and Winiarska Street.
