= Gorzkiewki =

Neighbourhood of Warsaw, Poland

- Neighbourhood
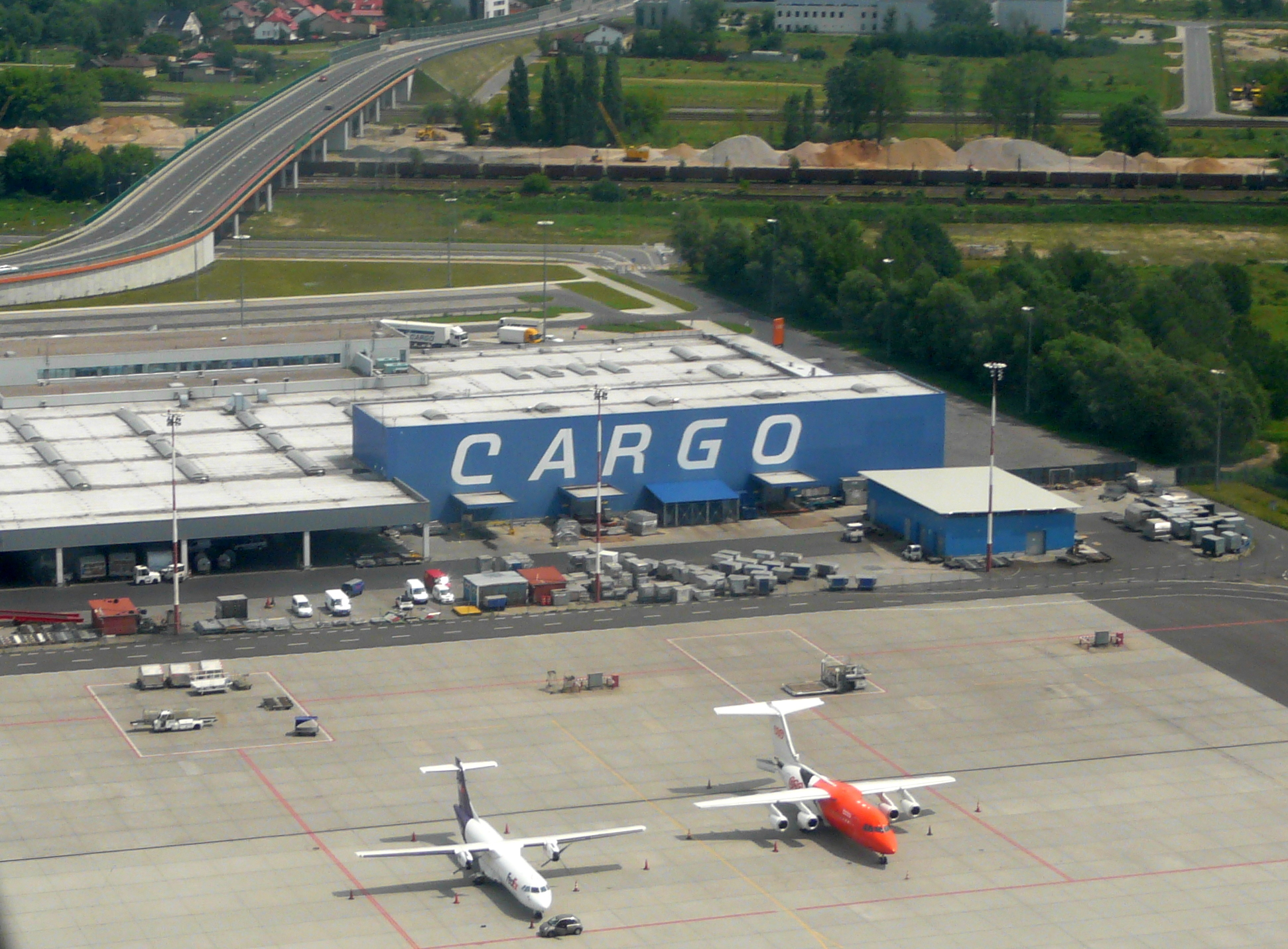
- The cargo terminal hub of the Warsaw Chopin Airport.
- Interactive map of Gorzkiewki
- Coordinates: 52.156375°N 20.983855°E
- Country: Poland
- Voivodeship: Masovian
- City county: Warsaw
- District: Włochy
- City Information System area: Paluch
- Time zone: UTC+1 (CET)
  - Summer (DST): UTC+2 (CEST)
- Area code: +48 22

Gorzkiewki (Polish: [ɡɔʂˈkjɛf.ki]) is a neighbourhood in Warsaw, Poland, within the Włochy district, in the City Information System of Paluch. The area encompasses the cargo terminal hub of the Warsaw Chopin Airport, as well as a portion of its taxiways and runways. In its vicinity is also present the cargo area of the Warszawa Okęcie railway station.

In 1422, the village of Gorzkiewki.was recorded in the area, and in 1451, it was granted the Kulm law privileges. In 1652, the hamlet of Paluch was also founded nearby. In 1934, the Warsaw Chopin Airport was opened in the area, becoming the largest airport in the country, and the hub of the LOT Polish Airlines. During the Second World War, while Warsaw remained under the German occupation, the airport was used for cargo transportation and as a base for the German Air Force. The airport was expanded and modernised between the 1960s and 1980s. In 1992, a new cargo terminal was opened at the airport, replacing the last remaining structures of Gorzkiewki.

== History ==
In 1422, the village of Gorzkiewki was recorded in the area, to the south of Okęcie and Zbarż. It was owned by the Zbarski family, and until the 19th century, it was known as Korzkiewki and Koczkiewki. In 1451, it was granted the Kulm law rights by Duke Bolesław IV of Warsaw, the ruler of the Duchy of Masovia. In 1528, Gorzkiewki and Zbarż were acquired by the Babicki family, and later became property of Jakub Hieronim Rozdrażewski, the voivode of Inowrocław Voivodeship. In 1827, Gorzkiewki had 82 inhabitants. Following the abolition of serfdom in 1864, the area was incorporated into the municipality of Wilanów. In 1883, the Fort VII "Zbarż" was constructed by the Imperial Russian Army to the north of Gorzkiewki, as part of the city fortifications, known as the Warsaw Fortress. The government heavily restricted construction in its vicinity, hindering the development of the nearby villages. The military fortifications were retired and partially demolished in 1913. Currently, it is located within the City Information System area of Okęcie.

In 1925, the government acquired 285 ha of land from Okęcie, Paluch, and Gorzkiewki, for the development of the Warsaw Chopin Airport, known until 2001 as the Warsaw Okęcie Airport, and another 200 ha for the nearby infrastructure. Its construction began in 1933, and it was opened on 29 April 1934, becoming the largest airport in Poland. It included two dirt intersecting runways, measuring 1,470 and 1,270 m (4,822.84 and 4,166.67 ft). It was originally only planned as a military airbase. However, upon its opening, it also replaced Mokotów Aerodrome as a passenger and cargo airport. It also became the central hub for the LOT Polish Airlines, and the home base of the 1st Aviation Regiment of the Polish Armed Forces. In 1932, a weather station was also opened next to the airport. In 1934, the Warszawa Okęcie railway station was opened near the airport. It formed a connection with the Warszawa Aleje Jerozolimskie station near Jerusalem Avenue, predominantly used by cargo trains. The same year, Żwirki i Wigury Street was also opened, providing a direct connection between the airport and the Downtown Warsaw.

The airport was bombed on 1 September 1939 by the German Air Force, during the first hours of the German invasion of Poland, which began the Second World War. It was captured on 8 September, and following repairs, it began to be used by the German Air Force. On 12 September, a group of soldiers from the 360th Infantry Regiment of the Polish Armed Forces, led by lieutenant colonel Jakub Chmura, together with two tank companies, attacked German positions in Okęcie and at the airport. It aimed to identify enemy forces on the western outskirts of Warsaw, destroy German defences and take prisoners. The attack was planned to begin at 3:00 am. However, due to delays with troops arriving at their position, it began at 7:00 am in daylight. Perhaps fearing that, due to the delay, colonel Marian Porwit would call off the attack, Chmura did not give the expected signal, according to which the 2nd Battalion of the 41st Infantry Regiment was to carry out a diversive attack from Ochota, and the heavy artillery was to support the attack on Okęcie. The attackers were divided into three groups. The main forces, consisting of two infantry companies and a group of tanks, led by Chmura, captured Zbarż and the airport, pushing back light German resistance. They continued the attack towards Załuski, however, while crossing an empty field, they were fired from both the west and the south, suffering heavy losses, including their commander, Chmura. Around 11:00 am, the Polish forces retreated. While under the German occupation, the airport was used for cargo transportation, and a new concrete runway was constructed there. A portion of the 1st division of the Air Fleet 6 of the German Air Force, was stationed at the airport, equipped with Junkers Ju 87 dive bomber aircraft. In 1944, the airport also had 56 anti-aircraft guns. In 1943, Gorzkiewki were inhabited by 237 people. On 1 August 1944, at 17:00, codenamed as the W-Hour, a small company of the 7th Infantry Regiment of the Home Army, led by Romuald Jakubowski, attacked the airport. The plans to attack were cancelled an hour prior to the event; however, the group did not receive the new orders in time. The soldiers charged from Zbarż, advancing across an open field, where they came under fierce German machine-gun fire, with Jakubowski dying in the attack. The group was ordered to retreat. However, a German armoured car drove to cut them off, firing at the retreating soldiers. Of the 180 attackers, approximately 120 were killed. The survivors scattered, with a small number successfully travelling to Mokotów. In October 1944, shortly before retreating from the city, German officers damaged the runway and taxiways and destroyed the air traffic control tower. The airport was opened for civilian use in March 1945.

On 15 May 1951, Gorzkiewki was incorporated into the city of Warsaw.

The Warsaw Chopin Airport was expanded between 1962 and 1969, including the construction of a new main runway and taxiways, as well as technical and administrative structures and cargo and postal infrastructure. In 1980, the runways were extended and modernised. In 1992, a new cargo and postal terminal hub was opened. It construction erased last structures of Gorzkiewki. It was again expanded in 2017, becoming the largest cargo airport terminal in the country.

On 19 May 2004, the Włochy district was subdivided into the City Information System areas, with Gorzkiewki being designated as a subarea of the neighbourhood of Paluch.

== Characteristics ==
The area of Gorzkiewki encompasses the cargo terminal hub of the Warsaw Chopin Airport, as well as a portion of its taxiways and runways. In its vicinity is also present the cargo area of the Warszawa Okęcie railway station. The City Information System of Warsaw designates Gorzkiewki as a subarea of Paluch, with its boundary marked by the railway line no. 8, and across the Warsaw Chopin Airport, between the cargo terminal and Winiarska Street.
