= Służewiec (disambiguation) =

Służewiec is a neighbourhood in Warsaw, Poland.

Służewiec may also refer to:

- Nowy Służewiec, a neighbourhood in Warsaw, Poland
- Służew Fort (also known as Służewiec Fort), a neighbourhood in Warsaw, Poland;
- Służewiec-Prototypy, a neighbourhood in Warsaw, Poland;
- Warszawa Służewiec railway station, a railway station in Warsaw, Poland.
