= Jadwisin, Warsaw =

Neighbourhood of Warsaw, Poland

Jadwisin
- Neighbourhood
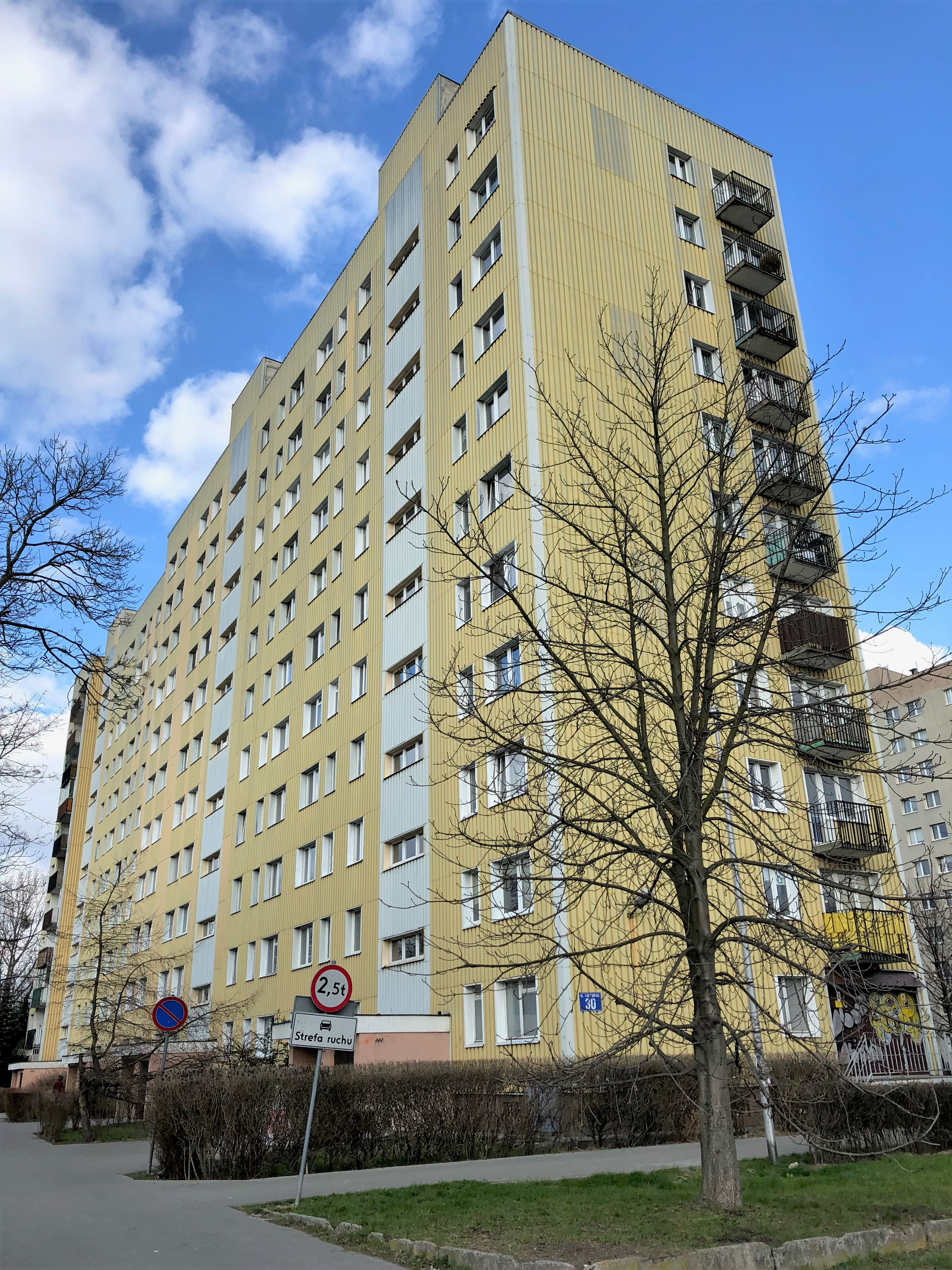
- An apartment building on Pierwszego Sierpnia Street.
- Interactive map of Jadwisin
- Coordinates: 52.193645°N 20.968133°E
- Country: Poland
- Voivodeship: Masovian
- City county: Warsaw
- District: Włochy
- CIS area: Okęcie
- CIS subarea: Jadwisin; Kolonia Rakowiec
- Time zone: UTC+1 (CET)
  - Summer (DST): UTC+2 (CEST)
- Area code: +48 22

Jadwisin (Polish: [jadˈvi.ɕin]) is a neighbourhood in Warsaw, Poland, within the Włochy district. It is located within the northwestern portion of the City Information System area of Okęcie, between Sulmierzycka Street, Lechicka Street, Krakowska Avenue, and the railway line no. 8. It consists of mid- and high-rise apartment buildings. The neighbourhood was developed as two housing estates between 1962 and 1972, and was later further expanded in the 1970s and 1980s.

== History ==
The neighbourhood was developed between 1962 and 1972, with mid-rise apartment buildings placed between Pierwszego Sierpnia Street, Sulmierzycka Street, Lechicka Street, and Krakowska Avenue. Originally named Okęcie-Pola, it was later renamed to Jadwisin. It was developed as two housing estates designated as A in the west, and B in the east, and separated by Radarowa Street. Jadwisin A was developed between 1962 and 1967, and had an area of 11 ha with 25 buildings, with 1,460 apartments for around 4,000 residents. Jadwisin B was developed between 1970 and 1972, and had an area of 6 ha with 10 buildings, with 800 apartments for around 2,800 residents. They were designed by Barbara Brukalska and Z. Malicki, respectively. The apartment buildings were constructed using the large panel system technique.

In 1962, the Warszawa Rakowiec railway station was also established on Grójecka Street, next to Jadwisin. In the 1970s and 1980s, another two small housing estates were developed as extension of Jadwisin, to the north of Pierwszego Sierpnia Street. They consisted of high-rise apartment buildings, also developed with the large panel system technique. Additionally, a small park with an amphitheatre and sports amenities was created as part of the development, named the Marek Kotański Park.

On 19 May 2004, the Włochy district was subdivided into the City Information System areas, with Jadwisin becoming part of the area of Okęcie. It was further subdivided into subareas, with Jadwisin becoming one of them. Its boundaries are marked by Pierwszego Sierpnia Street, Sulmierzyńska, Lechicka, and Krakowiecka Avenue. The area of the housing estate, located to the north of Pierwszego Sierpnia Street, became part of the subarea of Kolonia Rakowiec instead. In 2018, the Saint George the Victorious Church, a Polish Orthodox cathedral was opened at 2 Hynka Street.

== Characteristics ==
Jadwisin is a residential neighbourhood consisting of apartment buildings, located approximately between Sulmierzycka Street, Lechicka Street, Krakowska Avenue, and the railway line no. 8. A portion of the buildings extents further to the east alongside the northern side of Pierwszego Sierpnia Street, to its intersection with Solińska Street. Majority of its area, located to the south of Pierwszego Sierpnia Street, consists of two large housing estates, consisting of mid-rise buildings, developed between 1962 and 1972. To the north, it also includes two smaller estates, with high-rise buildings, constructed in the 1970s and 1980s. It also features the Marek Kotański Park, a public green area 2.63 ha, featuring an amphitheatre and sports amenities. The Warszawa Rakowiec railway station is also present on Grójecka Street, next to Jadwisin.

Jadwisin forms one of the subareas of the City Information System area of Okęcie, with its boundaries being marked by Pierwszego Sierpnia Street, Sulmierzyńska, Lechicka, and Krakowiecka Avenue. The area of the housing estate, located to the north of Pierwszego Sierpnia Street, is also part of the subarea of Kolonia Rakowiec instead.
