= Wyczółki =

Neighbourhood in Warsaw, Poland

- City Information System area
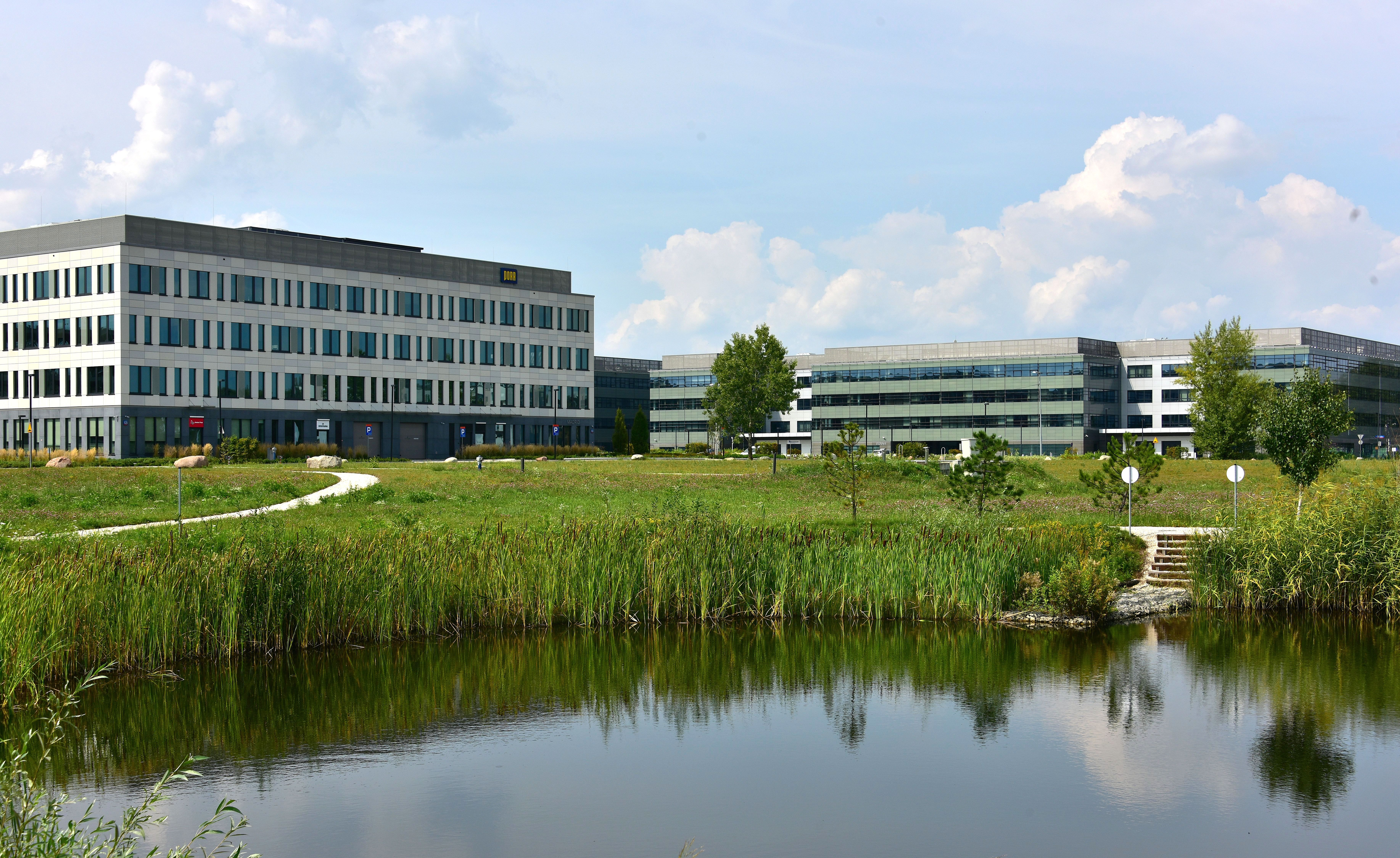
- An office complex in Wyczółki in 2018.

- The location of the City Information System area of Wyczółki within the city district of Ursynów
- Coordinates: 52°09′32″N 20°59′57″E
- Country: Poland
- Voivodeship: Masovian
- City and county: Warsaw
- District: Ursynów
- Administrative neighbourhood: Wyczółki
- Time zone: UTC+1 (CET)
  - Summer (DST): UTC+2 (CEST)
- Area code: +48 22

Wyczółki (Polish: [vɘ̟ˈt͡ʂuw.ki]) is a neighbourhood, and a City Information System area, within the Ursynów district of Warsaw, Poland. It is a mixed area, consisting of residential zones, as well as business office complexes and storage warehouses.

The oldest known records of Wyczółki, then a small village owned by petty nobility, date to 1483. In 1805, the Wyczółki Manor House was built in the area, together with an English landscape garden, now known as the Wyczółki Park. In 1939, the Służewiec Racecourse was opened to the east of Wyczółki, becoming the largest and the most modern horse racing venue in Europe at the time. A portion of the area was incorporated into the city in 1938, while the remaining part, in 1951. Between the 1950s and 1970s, manufacturing industry developed in the area, as part of the industrial district of Służewiec. In the 1990s, it transformed into residential and office spaces.

== History ==
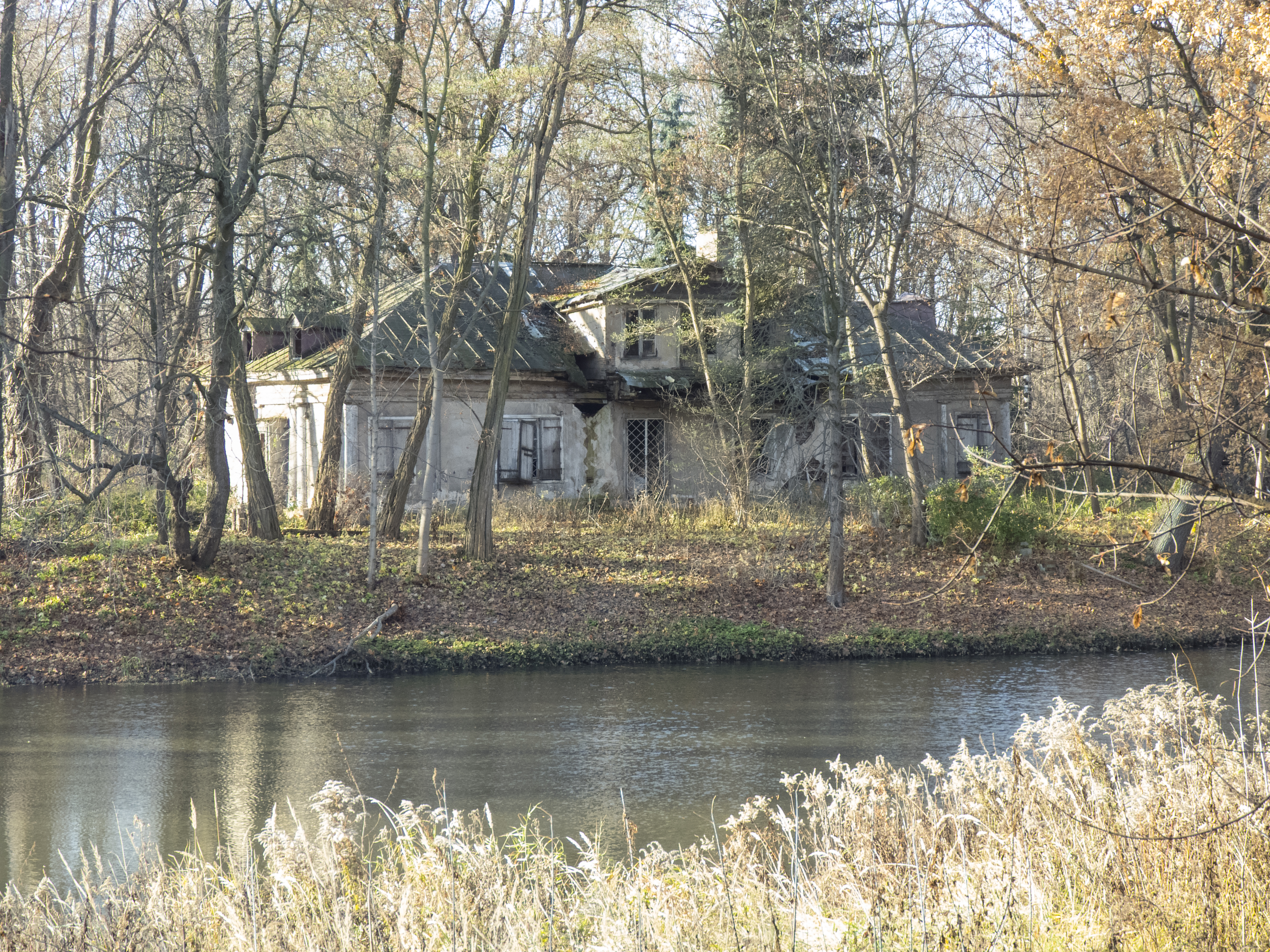
The Wyczółki Manor House, built in 1805.

The oldest known records of Wyczółki, then known as Wyczółkowo (spelled as Vyczolkovo), come from 1483. It was a small village owned by petty nobility.

In 1805, castellan Franciszek Krotkowski, the owner of the village, built the Wyczółki Manor House as his residence, placed near Berensewicz Ponds, at the current 53 Łączyny Street. Around them was developed an English landscape garden, now known as the Wyczółki Park.

Between 1925 and 1939, the Służewiec Racecourse, was built to the east of Wyczółki, at the current 266 Puławska Street. Upon its opening, it became the largest and the most modern horse racing venue in Europe. It included two tracks, the main turf circuit with the length of 2,300 m, now located within the City Information System area of North Ursynów, and a smaller dirt circuit, with the length of 1,950 m, within Wyczółki.

In 1934, the Warszawa Okęcie railway station was opened near Gorzkiewki Street, to serve the nearby Warsaw Chopin Airport.

Wyczółki was incorporated into the city of Warsaw on 27 September 1938. Larger portion of the modern City Information System area of Wyczółki remained outside the city boundaries until it was incorporated on 14 May 1951. During the German occupation of Poland in the Second World War, the Służewiec Racecourse served as an airstrip for the fighter aircraft of the German Air Force. In July 1944, between 600 and 800 soldiers were stationed there. On 1 August 1944, on the first day of the Warsaw Uprising, the airstrip was attacked by the Polish resistance partisants from the Karpaty Battalion of the Baszta Regiment Group. It was unsuccessful, with partisants experiencing heavy casualties. Later that day, in retaliation, captured partisans and a group of civilians from the nearby Służew were executed at the racetrack..

In 1951, the area of Służewiec, Zbarż, and Wyczółki, was designated to become the Industrial and Storage District of Służewiec (Polish: Dzielnica Przemysłowo-Składowa „Służewiec”), later known as Służewiec Przemysłowy (Industrial Służewiec). It was envisioned to feature 60 factories and industrial plants. The construction began in 1952, and utilised the large panel system technique, marking it as one of the first instances of its usage in Poland. The designated area covered around 2.6 km^{2} (1 sq mi). In the early 1970s, around 20,000 people were employed in the industrial district. In the 1990s, the manufacturing industry left the area, leading to the emergence of residential and office buildings in its place.

In 1995, the Grabów Cemetery, operated by the nearby St. Sophie Barat Church, was opened at Poloneza Street.

In 1996, the administrative neighbourhood of Wyczółki, governmened by an elected council, was established as a subdivision of the municipality of Warsaw-Ursynów, which was replaced by the Ursynów district in 2002. Its status was reconfirmed in 2013. In 1998, the district of Ursynów was subdivided into the City Information System areas, with Wyczółki becoming one of them.

== Characteristics ==
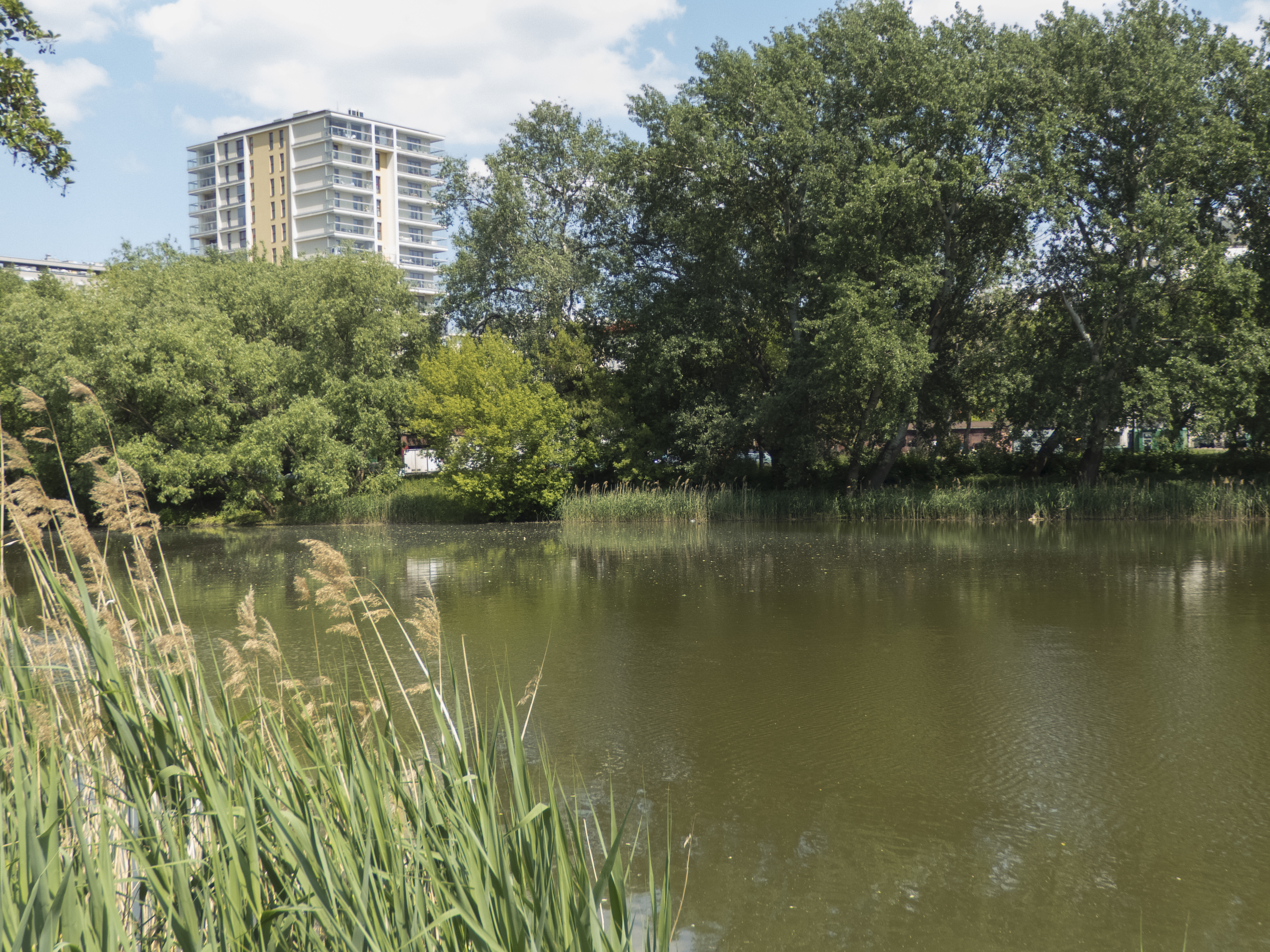
The Wyścigi Pond.

Wyczółki is a mixed area, consisting of residential zones, as well as business office complexes and storage warehouses. A portion of its area, measuring 159 ha,nis administered as the neighbourhood of Wyczółki, governmened by an elected council. Its boundaries are determined to the north by Galopu Street, and Służewiec Racecourse; to the east by Poloneza Street; to the south by Płąsy Street; and to the west by the track of the railway line no. 8.

It includes several bodies of water, such as Grabów Lake in the southeast, and Berensewicz Ponds in the centre, and Wyścigi Pond in the northeast, as well as the Służewiec Stream, Grabów Canal, and Boxer Canal crossing the neighbourhood. The area also features the Wyczółki Park, centred on the Berensewicz Ponds. It includes the Wyczółki Manor House, dating to 1805. The park complex is a private property, closed off to the public.

A secondary dirt circuit of the Służewiec Racecourse, with the length of 1,950 m, is located within the neighbourhood, near Bokserska Street. Every year, the venue hosts the Great Warsaw Race, the most prestigious horse race in Poland. The main portion of the race track, including the main circuit, is located outside the boundaries of Wyczółki, in the nearby North Ursynów.

Wyczółki also features the Warszawa Okęcie railway station, located near Gorzkiewki Street, which provides transit links with the nearby Warsaw Chopin Airport.

Additionally, the neighbourhood also has the Grabów Cemetery, which is operated by the nearby St. Sophie Barat Church in Grabów.

== Location and boundaries ==
Wyczółki is a City Information System area, located within the north-western portion of the Ursynów district. To the north, its boundary is determined by Bokserska Street, in a straight line north from the eastern end of Bokserska Street to Wyścigowa Avenue, and following it until Służewiec Stream; to the east, by Służewiec Stream, the eastern shore of Wyścigi Pond, the boundary of the Służewiec Racecourse, Wyczółki Street, and Poloneza Street; to the south, by Pląsy Street; and to the west, by the tracks of the railway line no. 8.

The City Information System area borders borders Służew, and Służewiec to the north, North Ursynów to the northeast, Grabów to the southeast, and Okęcie, and Paluch to the west. Its northern and western boundaries form the border of Ursynów with Mokotów to the north, and Włochy to the west.
