= Wyczółki Park =

Urban park in Warsaw, Poland

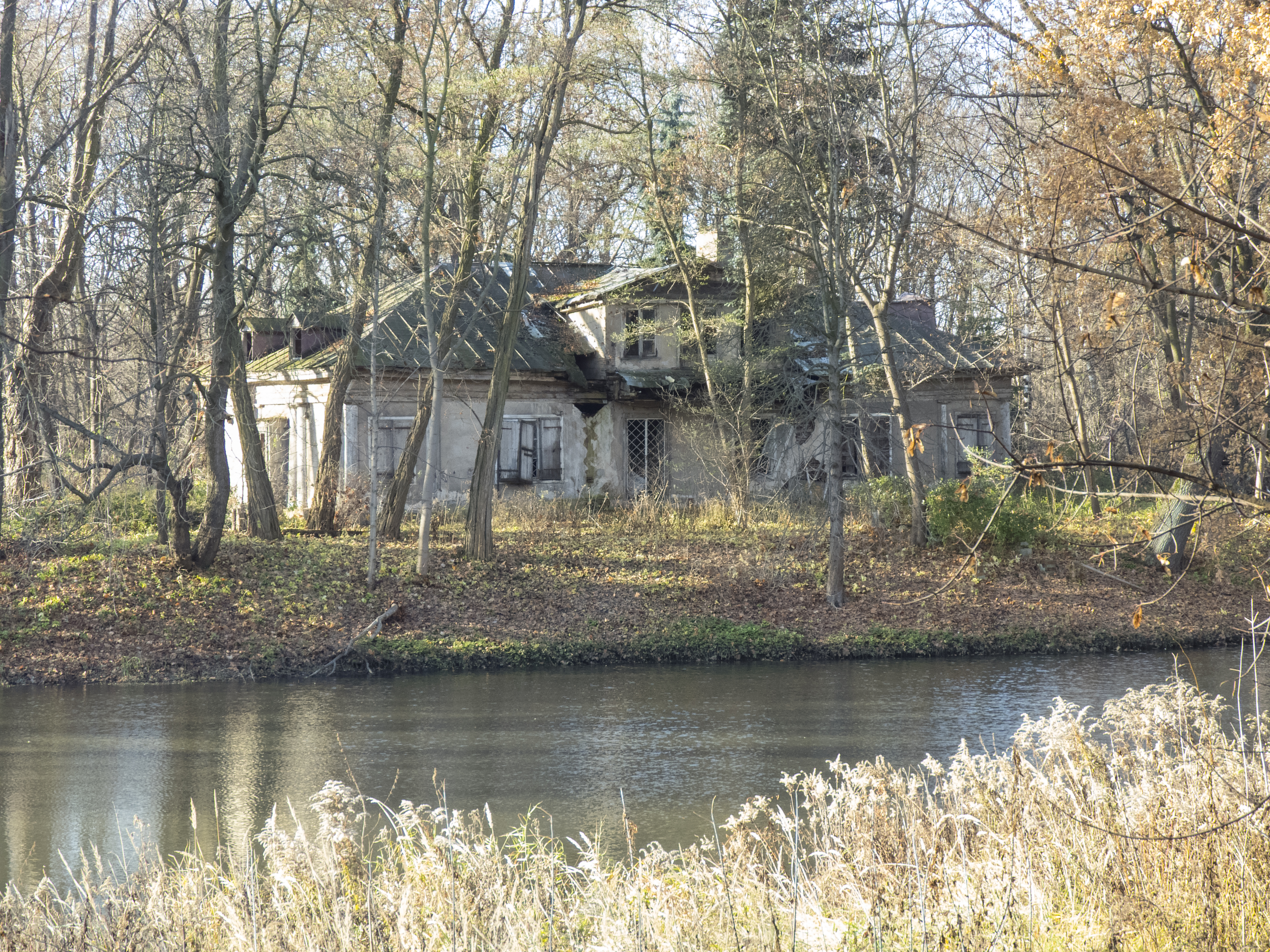
- Wyczółki Manor House in the park, in 2016.
- Interactive map of Wyczółki Park
- Type: Private urban park
- Location: Ursynów, Warsaw, Poland
- Coordinates: 52°09′32.34″N 20°59′57.73″E
- Area: 3 hectares (7.4 acres)
- Created: 1805

The Wyczółki Park (Polish pronunciation: [vɘ̟ˈt͡ʂuw.ki]; Polish: Park Wyczółki) is a private park in Warsaw, Poland. It is located in Wyczyółki neighbourhood of Ursynów district, between Łęczyny, Wyczółki, and Pieskowa Skała Streets. It dates to 1805 when it was founded as an English landscape garden. The park has an area of 3 ha.

== History ==
In 1805, castellan Franciszek Krotkowski, who then owned the village of Wyczyółki, built there the Wyczółki Manor House as his residence. It was placed near two Berensewicz Ponds. Around them was developed an English landscape garden. In 1938, the area was incorporated into Warsaw. In 1965, the park, together with sculptures located in it, were given the status of a protected cultural property.

== Characteristics ==
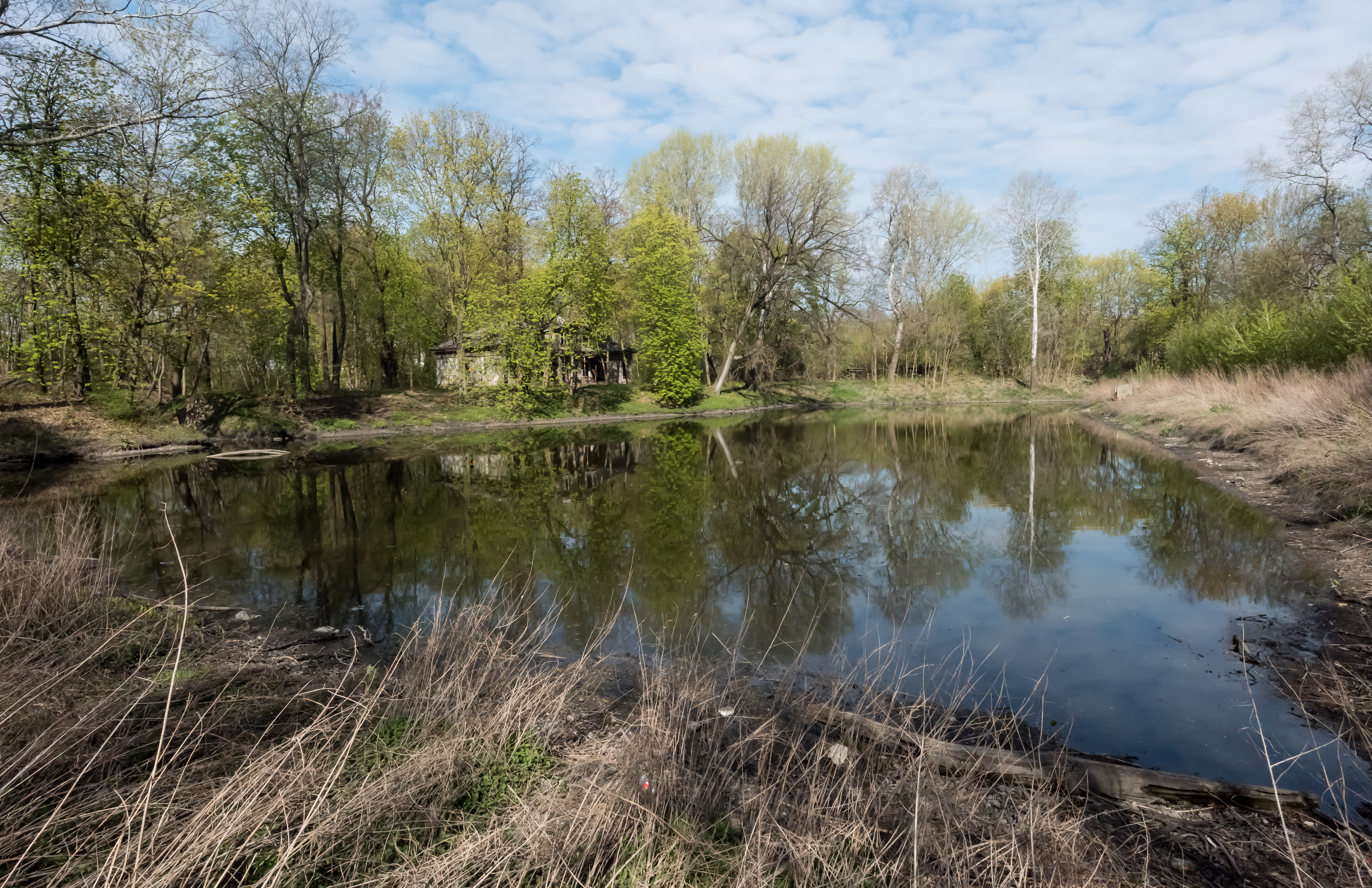
Southern Berensewicz Pond in 2020.

The park is located between Łęczyny, Wyczółki, and Pieskowa Skała Streets. It is a private property, and closed off to the public. It includes the Wyczółki Manor House, a historical residence dating to 1805, several sculptures, and a small chappel. Small lakes, known as the Berensewicz Ponds are also located here. It has an area of 3 ha.

The park has tree species such as elm, silver poplar, horse chestnut, Norway maple, pedunculate oak, and to a lesser extent also eastern white pine, Austrian pine, and European larch. Three elms, with diameters of their trunks over 3 m, have statues of natural monument. Additionally, such distinction was also held by a black poplar, with diameter of its trunk of 625 cm, making it one of the largest trees in the city. It lost said status in 2012, following its death.

The park, together with sculptures located in it, have the status of a protected cultural property.
