= Zbarż Pond =

Pond in Warsaw, Poland

Staw Zbarski
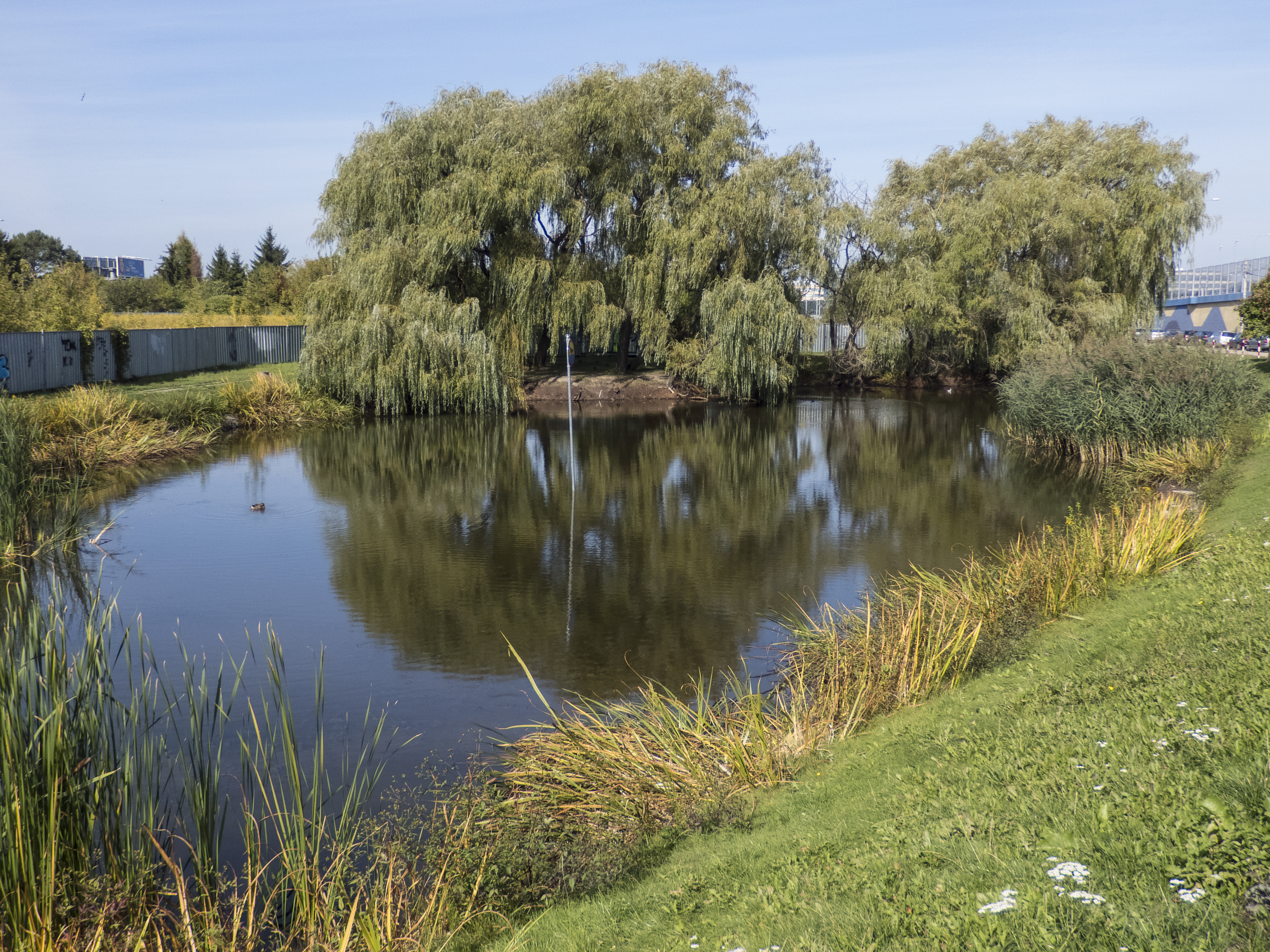
- A view on Staw Zbarski from the south

- Location within Poland
- Location: Warsaw, Poland
- Coordinates: 52°10′48″N 20°59′00″E
- Surface area: 0.2727 ha (0.674 acres)
- Average depth: 0.37 m (1 ft 3 in)
- Shore length^{1}: 265 m (869 ft)
- ^{1} Shore length is not a well-defined measure.

Staw Zbarski is a small pond in Warsaw in the district of Włochy.

== Location ==
The pond is located to the left of the Vistula, in Warsaw, in the district of Włochy, in the region of osiedle Zbarż, near Wirażowa street. Located in the vicinity of Expressway S79 by an interchange that connects the road with the streets Marynarska and Sasanki.

The document "Program Ochrony Środowiska dla m. st. Warszawy na lata 2009-2012 z uwzględnieniem perspektywy do 2016 r." reports that the pond is located on an eminence and has an area equal to 0.2727 hectares. According to another source, it is 0,25 hectares. The average depth is 0.37 m and the coastline is 265 m. The whole area of a small surrounding park – "Zieleniec ze Stawem Zbarskim" is 0.47 hectares.

The reservoir is probably the only naturally formed on the territory of the district, is located in the relief depression. In the past, was on the territory of the former village Zbarż.

== Nature ==
On-site of the pond following plant species were detected: Phragmites, Schoenoplectus lacustris, Typha latifolia, Ceratophyllum and Elodea canadensis. In the vicinity of the reservoir there are willows. In a study in 2004 on the territory of the pond and its surroundings mallards were detected.

Staw Zbarski has been restored in 1998.
