= Warszawa Służewiec railway station =

Railway station in Warsaw, Poland

Warszawa Służewiec
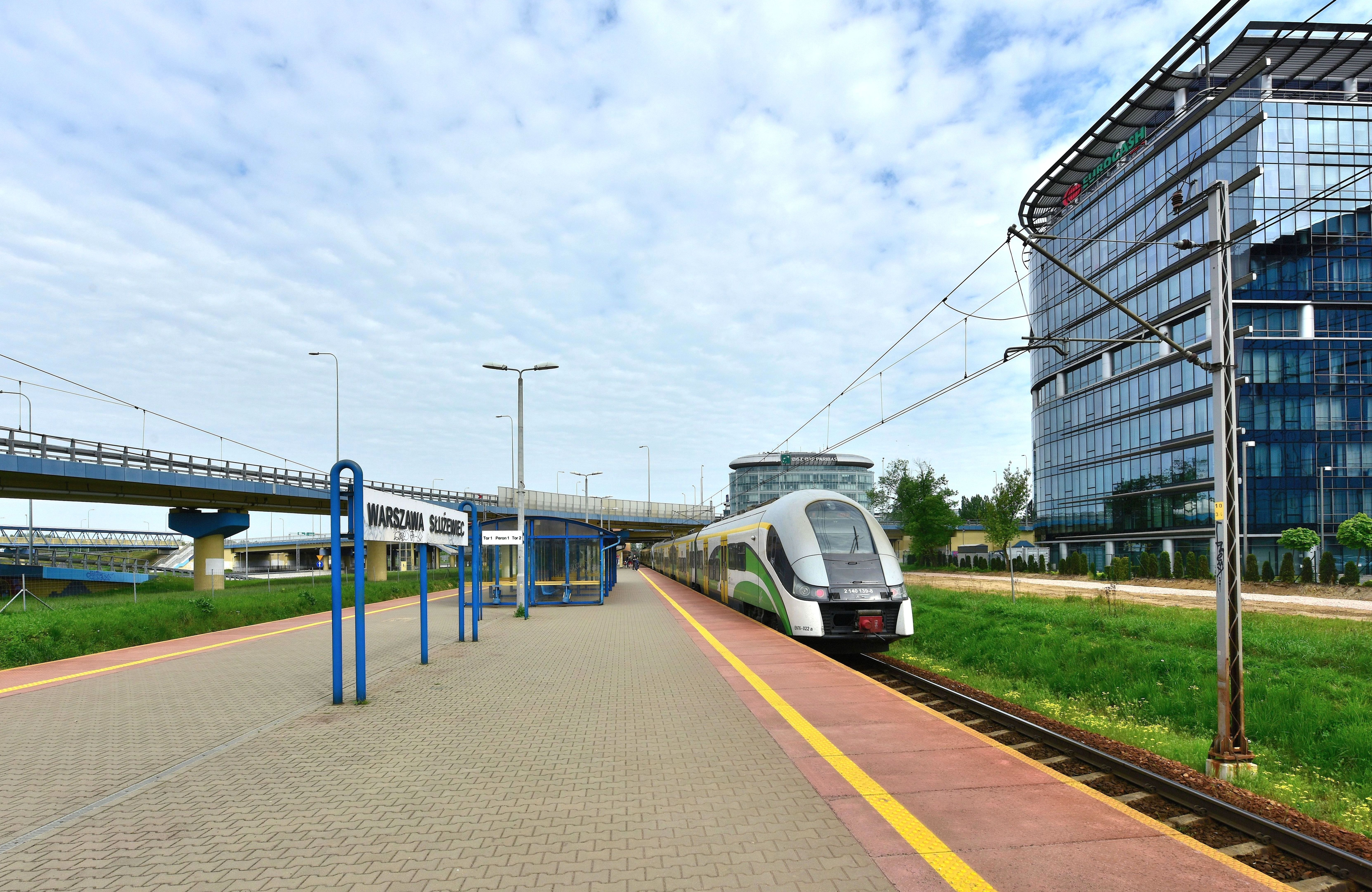
- The Warszawa Służewiec railway stop in 2018.

General information
- Location: Mokotów, Warsaw, Masovian Voivodeship; Poland
- Coordinates: 52°10′49″N 20°59′13″E
- Owner: Polish State Railways
- Platforms: 2
- Tracks: 3

Construction
- Structure type: Building: No

Services
Preceding station	Masovian Railways	Following station
Warszawa Okęcie towards Góra Kalwaria or Skarżysko-Kamienna	R8	Warszawa Żwirki i Wigury towards Warszawa Wschodnia
Warszawa Jeziorki towards Radom	RE8 Trains No. 12680/12681	Warszawa Żwirki i Wigury towards Warszawa Wschodnia
Warszawa Okęcie towards Skarżysko-Kamienna	RE8 Trains No. 12690/12691	Warszawa Żwirki i Wigury towards Warszawa Wschodnia
Warszawa Okęcie towards Góra Kalwaria or Skarżysko-Kamienna	R8	Warszawa Żwirki i Wigury towards Warszawa Wschodnia
Warsaw Chopin Airport Terminus	RL	Warszawa Żwirki i Wigury towards Modlin
Preceding station	SKM Warsaw	Following station
Warsaw Chopin Airport Terminus	S2	Warszawa Żwirki i Wigury towards Sulejówek Miłosna
Warsaw Chopin Airport Terminus	S3	Warszawa Żwirki i Wigury towards Legionowo Piaski or Radzymin
Warszawa Okęcie towards Piaseczno	S4	Warszawa Żwirki i Wigury towards Zegrze Południowe
Warszawa Okęcie towards Piaseczno	S40	Warszawa Żwirki i Wigury towards Warszawa Rakowiec
Location

Warszawa Służewiec is a railway stop in the city of Warsaw, Poland, on Marynarska Street, operated by the Polish State Railways. It is located at the railway line no. 8, which connects Warszawa Zachodnia (Warsaw West) and Kraków Główny (Kraków Main) railway stations. It operates lines of the Fast Urban Railway and Masovian Railways.

In its north section, ahead of the platform, there is a trapezoidal crossover between the tracks. In the southern section, there are branching switches where railway line no. 440 to Warszawa Lotnisco Chopina station begins.

The railway stop is located in the city district of Mokotów, within the City Information System of Służewiec, and the Municipal neighbourhood of Służewiec Południowy.

== History ==
The Warszawa Służewiec railway station was opened in 1962.

== Passengers ==
In 2021, it the railway stop was used by 657 000 passengers, with average number of passengers each day being 1 800.
