= Warszawa Żwirki i Wigury railway station =

Railway station in Warsaw, Poland

Warszawa Żwirki i Wigury
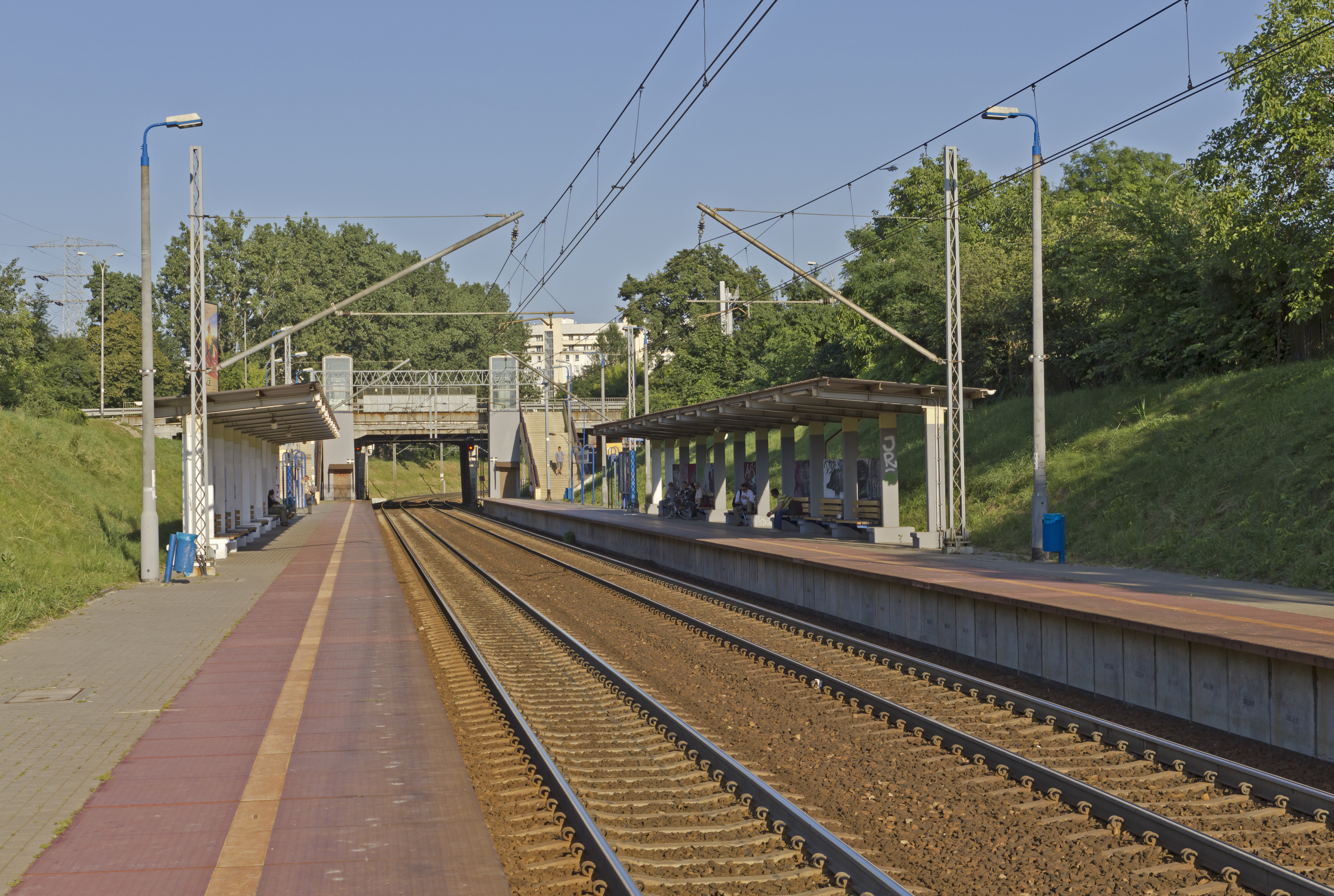

General information
- Location: Ochota, Warsaw, Masovian; Poland
- Coordinates: 52°11′35″N 20°58′52″E
- Owner: Polskie Koleje Państwowe S.A.
- Platforms: 2
- Tracks: 2

Construction
- Structure type: Building: No

History
- Opened: 2008

Services
Preceding station	Masovian Railways	Following station
Warszawa Służewiec towards Góra Kalwaria or Skarżysko-Kamienna	R8	Warszawa Rakowiec towards Warszawa Wschodnia
Warszawa Służewiec towards Góra Kalwaria or Skarżysko-Kamienna	RE8	Warszawa Rakowiec towards Warszawa Wschodnia
Warszawa Służewiec towards Warsaw Chopin Airport	RL	Warszawa Rakowiec towards Modlin
Preceding station	SKM Warsaw	Following station
Warszawa Służewiec towards Warsaw Chopin Airport	S2	Warszawa Rakowiec towards Sulejówek Miłosna
Warszawa Służewiec towards Warsaw Chopin Airport	S3	Warszawa Rakowiec towards Legionowo Piaski or Radzymin
Warszawa Służewiec towards Piaseczno	S4	Warszawa Rakowiec towards Zegrze Południowe
Warszawa Służewiec towards Piaseczno	S40	Warszawa Rakowiec Terminus
Location

Warszawa Żwirki i Wigury railway station is a railway station in the Ochota district of Warsaw, Poland. It is served by Masovian Railways, who run services from Warszawa Wschodnia to Góra Kalwaria or Skarżysko-Kamienna.
