= Załuski, Warsaw =

Neighbourhood of Warsaw, Poland

Załuski
- City Information System area (neighbourhood)
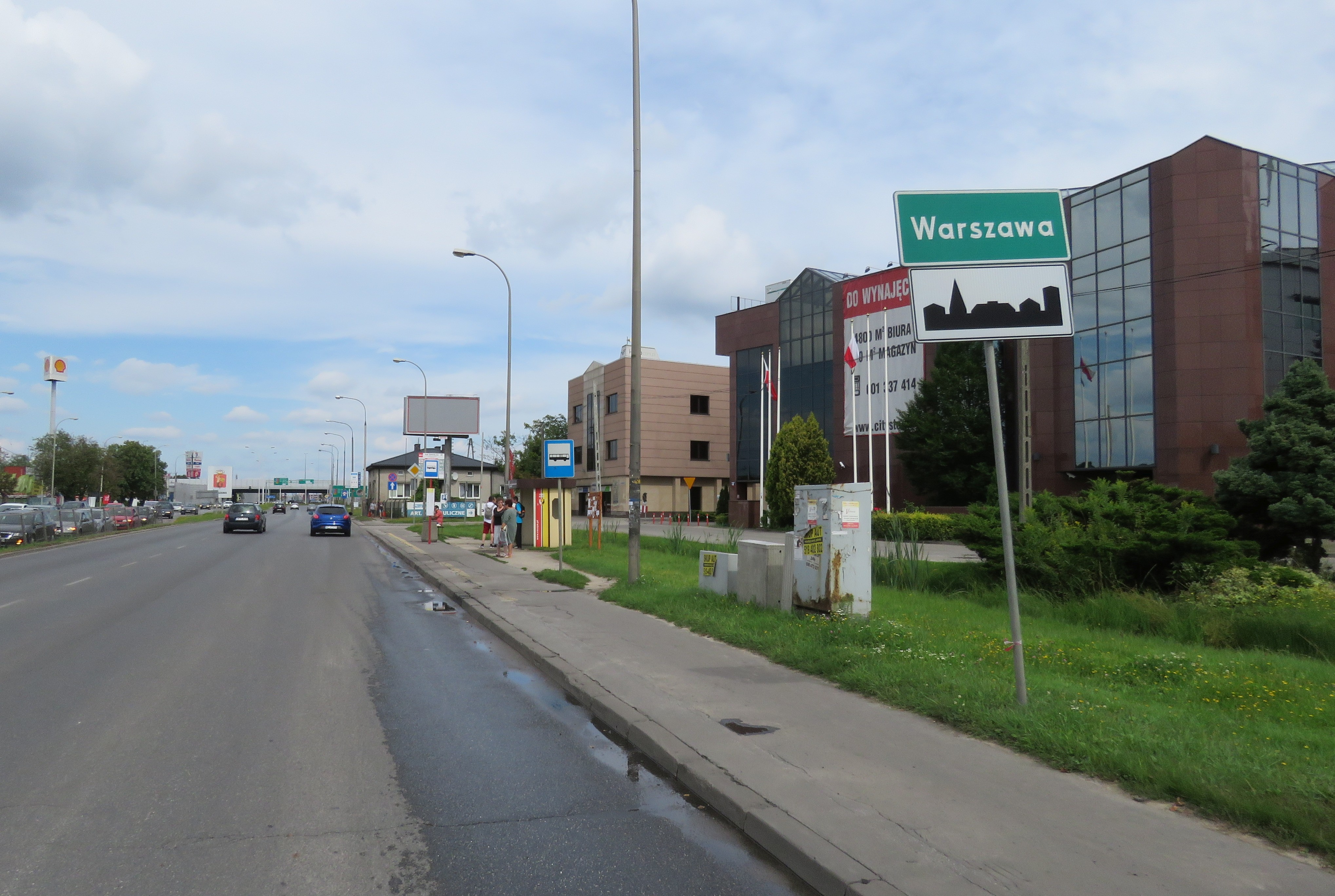
- Krakowska Avenue in Załuski.

- Załuski within the Włochy district.
- Coordinates: 52°10′09.0″N 20°56′21.7″E
- Country: Poland
- Voivodeship: Masovian
- City county: Warsaw
- District: Włochy
- Time zone: UTC+1 (CET)
  - Summer (DST): UTC+2 (CEST)
- Area code: +48 22

Załuski (Polish: [zaˈwus.ki]) is a neighbourhood, and a City Information System area, in Warsaw, Poland, within the Włochy district. Załuski is a mixed area, with its southern portion being dedicated to low-rise housing, while the north forms a warehouse and shopping district. In the 16th century, the village of Górki was founded in the area, being later destroyed Swedish forces in 1656, during the Second Northern War. A new village, named Załuski, was established in the area in the second half of the 17th century. It was incorporated into Warsaw in 1951.

== Toponomy ==
The neighbourhood is named after Andrzej Chryzostom Załuski, the Grand Chancellor of the Crown and the bishop of Warmia, who founded it in the 17th century.

== History ==
In the 16th century, the village of Górki was founded in the area. It was owned by, and named after, the Górek family of the clan of Łodzia. In 1528, the village, along with its surrounding farmlands, measured approximately 2 lans, an equivalent of around 34 ha (0.13 sq mi). It was burned down by Swedish forces during the Second Northern War. In the second half of the 17th century, a hamlet of Załuski was founded in place of the former settlement. It was established by, and named after, Andrzej Chryzostom Załuski, the Grand Chancellor of the Crown and the bishop of Warmia. In the 18th century, it was acquired by Arnold Anastazy Byszewski, the lieutenant general of the Crown Army, and the aide-de-camp of King Stanisław August Poniatowski, becoming part of his large landed estate. In the 19th century, the hamlet of Kalinowo was founded nearby and was later incorporated into Załuski. In the 1880s, the Kraków Road was built, passing near Załuski, connecting Warsaw and Kraków. Following the abolition of serfdom in 1864, Załuski was incorporated into the municipality of Skorosze.

In 1934, the Warsaw Chopin Airport was opened to the southeast of Załuski. On 1 April 1939, Załuski was incorporated into the municipality of Okęcie. On 8 September 1939, Załuski was captured by the Wehrmacht during the German invasion of Poland in the Second World War. On 12 September, a group of soldiers from the 360th Infantry Regiment of the Polish Armed Forces, led by lieutenant colonel Jakub Chmura, together with two tank companies, attacked German positions in Okęcie. It aimed to identify enemy forces on the western outskirts of Warsaw, destroy German defences and take prisoners. The attack was planned to begin at 3:00 am. However, due to delays with troops arriving at their position, it began at 7:00 am in daylight. Perhaps fearing that, due to the delay, colonel Marian Porwit would call off the attack, Chmura did not give the expected signal, according to which the 2nd Battalion of the 41st Infantry Regiment was to carry out a diversive attack from Ochota, and the heavy artillery was to support the attack on Okęcie. The attackers were divided into three groups. The main forces, consisting of two infantry companies and a group of tanks, led by Chmura, captured nearby Zbarż and the Warsaw Chopin Airport, pushing back a light German resistance. They continued the attack towards Załuski, however, while crossing an empty field, they were fired on from both the west and the south, suffering heavy losses, including their commander, Chmura. Around 11:00 am, the Polish forces retreated. In 1943, Załuski had 1,073 inhabitants, while by 1947, the number of its residents decreased to 468.

On 15 May 1951, Załuski was incorporated into the city of Warsaw. The nearby Warsaw Chopin Airport was expanded between 1962 and 1969, including the construction of a new main runway and taxiways. The runways were extended in 1980. During the expansion, a portion of Załuski was taken over by the airport, with local houses being demolished.

In 2002, the Włochy district was subdivided into the City Information System areas, with Załuski becoming one of them. Between 2010 and 2013, the expressway S2 was built crossing through Załuski, as part of the ring road system around Warsaw.

== Characteristics ==
Załuski is a mixed area, with its southern portion being dedicated to low-rise housing, while the north forms a warehouse and shopping district. It includes the Okęcie Park shopping mall at 61 Krakowska Avenue. Its northwest corner also includes a portion of the runway of the Warsaw Chopin Airport. The neighbourhood is also crossed by the expressway S2 which forms a part a ring road around Warsaw.
