= Warszawa Rakowiec railway station =

Railway station in Warsaw, Poland

Warszawa Rakowiec
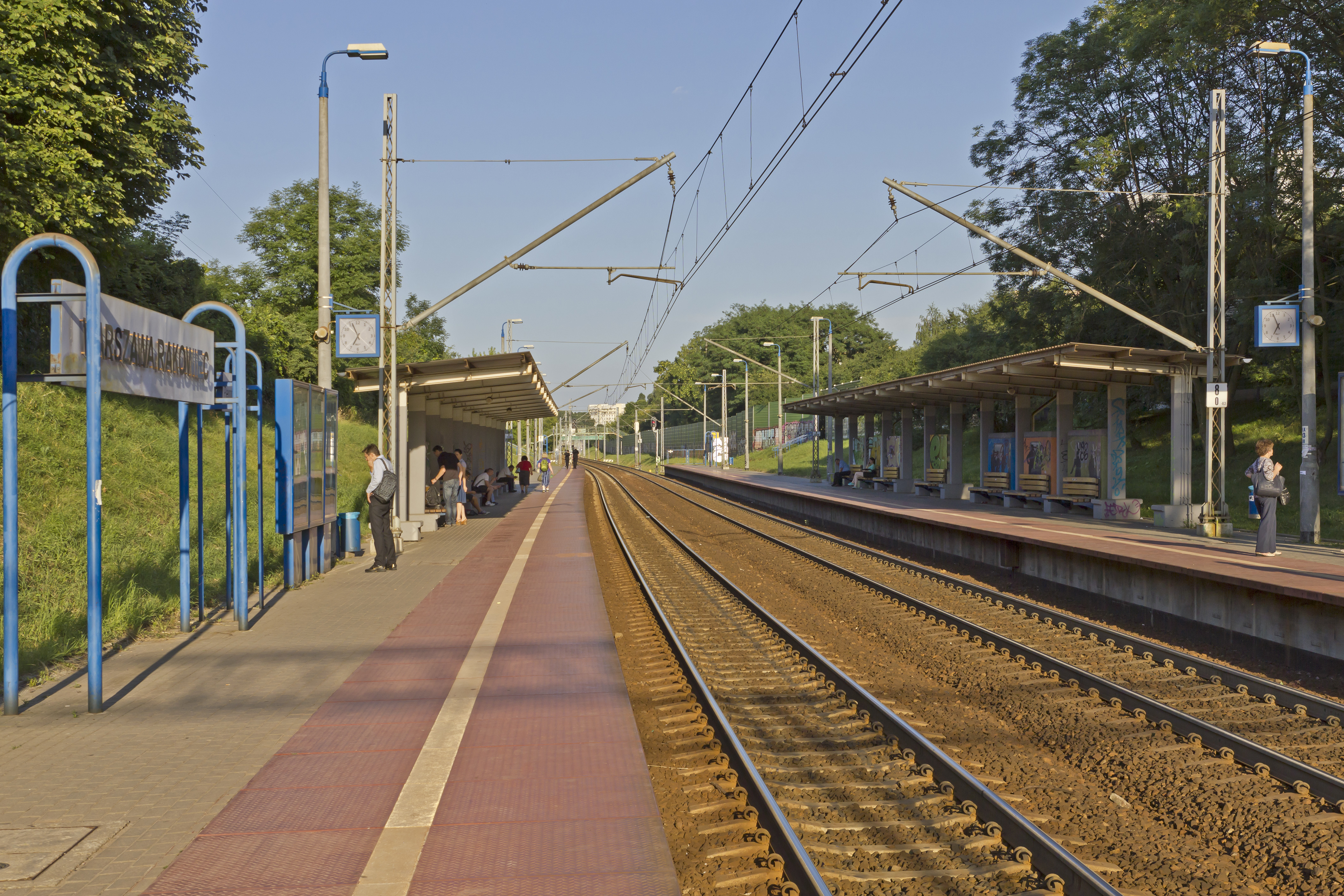

General information
- Location: Ochota, Warsaw, Masovian; Poland
- Coordinates: 52°11′48″N 20°57′59″E
- Owner: Polskie Koleje Państwowe S.A.
- Platforms: 2
- Tracks: 2

Construction
- Structure type: Building: No

Services
Preceding station	Masovian Railways	Following station
Warszawa Żwirki i Wigury towards Góra Kalwaria or Skarżysko-Kamienna	R8	Warszawa Aleje Jerozolimskie towards Warszawa Wschodnia
Warszawa Żwirki i Wigury towards Góra Kalwaria or Skarżysko-Kamienna	RE8	Warszawa Zachodnia towards Warszawa Wschodnia
Warszawa Żwirki i Wigury towards Warsaw Chopin Airport	RL	Warszawa Aleje Jerozolimskie towards Modlin
Preceding station	SKM Warsaw	Following station
Warszawa Żwirki i Wigury towards Warsaw Chopin Airport	S2	Warszawa Aleje Jerozolimskie towards Sulejówek Miłosna
Warszawa Żwirki i Wigury towards Warsaw Chopin Airport	S3	Warszawa Aleje Jerozolimskie towards Legionowo Piaski or Radzymin
Warszawa Żwirki i Wigury towards Piaseczno	S4	Warszawa Aleje Jerozolimskie towards Zegrze Południowe
Warszawa Żwirki i Wigury towards Piaseczno	S40	Terminus
Location

Warszawa Rakowiec railway station is a railway station in the Ochota district of Warsaw, Poland. It is served by Masovian Railways, who run services from Warszawa Wschodnia to Góra Kalwaria or Skarżysko-Kamienna.
