= Zbarż =

Coordinates: 52.1667°N 20.9667°E

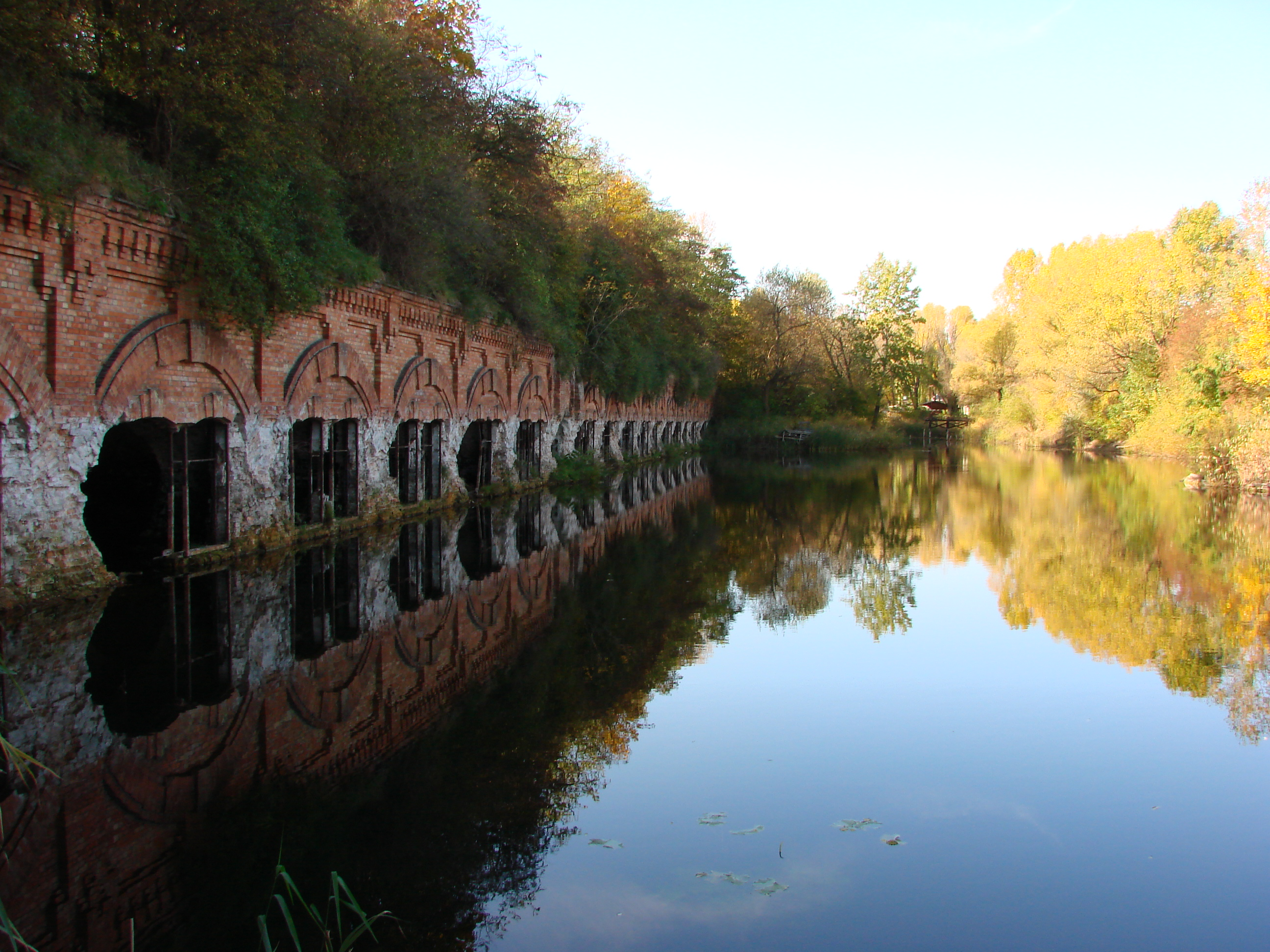
Modern view of the former fort

Zbarż (Polish pronunciation: [zbarʐ]) is a locality within the borough of Włochy and a former village. It was established some time in 13th or 14th century. Granted with Magdeburg Law by Prince Bolesław IV of Warsaw, it was home to the Zbarski family until 1528, when Mazovia was annexed by Poland and the village was taken over by Babicki family. Approximately a century later they sold the village to Jakub Hieronim Rozdrażewski, the voivode of Inowrocław. The village practically ceased to exist after 1886, when Russian authorities built one of the forts of the Warsaw Fortress (Fort VII Zbarż). In 1938 parts of the former village were joined with the city of Warsaw, the rest was incorporated in 1951.

A small pond, Staw Zbarski is located in Zbarż.
