= Widok =

Widok (meaning "view" in Polish) may refer to:

- Widok, Masovian Voivodeship
- Widok, Opole Voivodeship
- Widok, Szczecin
