= Marynin =

Marynin may refer to the following places:

- Marynin, Kuyavian-Pomeranian Voivodeship (north-central Poland)
- Marynin, Gmina Siedliszcze in Lublin Voivodeship (east Poland)
- Marynin, Gmina Rejowiec in Lublin Voivodeship (east Poland)
- Marynin, Lublin County in Lublin Voivodeship (east Poland)
- Marynin, Łódź Voivodeship (central Poland)
- Marynin, Radzyń County in Lublin Voivodeship (east Poland)
- Marynin, Gmina Grodzisk Mazowiecki in Masovian Voivodeship (east-central Poland)
- Marynin, Grójec County in Masovian Voivodeship (east-central Poland)
