= Żelazna =

Żelazna may refer to the following places:

- Żelazna, Rawa County in Łódź Voivodeship (central Poland)
- Żelazna, Skierniewice County in Łódź Voivodeship (central Poland)
- Żelazna, Garwolin County in Masovian Voivodeship (east-central Poland)
- Żelazna, Grójec County in Masovian Voivodeship (east-central Poland)
- Żelazna, Brzeg County in Opole Voivodeship (south-west Poland)
- Żelazna, Opole County in Opole Voivodeship (south-west Poland)
- Żelazna, Pomeranian Voivodeship (north Poland)

Żelazna may also refer to:

- Zelazna is also a breed of sheep raised in Poland.
