= Pavlivka =

Pavlivka (Ukrainian: Павлі́вка) may refer to any of numerous settlements in Ukraine:

- Pavlivka, a village in Vuhledar urban hromada, Volnovakha Raion, Donetsk Oblast
- Pavlivka, a village in Yamnytsia rural hromada, Ivano-Frankivsk Raion, Ivano-Frankivsk Oblast
- Pavlivka, a rural settlement in Dovzhansk urban hromada, Dovzhansk Raion, Luhansk Oblast
- Pavlivka, a village in Stepanivka rural hromada, Rozdilna Raion, Odesa Oblast
- Pavlivka, a village in Kalynivka urban hromada, Khmilnyk Raion, Vinnytsia Oblast
- Pavlivka, a village, the administrative centre of Pavlivka rural hromada of Volodymyr Raion, Volyn Oblast

== See also ==
- Nova Pavlivka
- Novopavlivka
- Pavel, a name
- Pavlivka Druha
- Pavlivka Persha
- Pavlivske
- Pavlovka, Russia
- Pawłówka, Poland
