= Budziszyn =

Budziszyn may refer to:

- Bautzen, Germany - Budziszyn in Polish
- Budziszyn, Masovian Voivodeship (east-central Poland)
