= Regional Museum in Szczecinek =

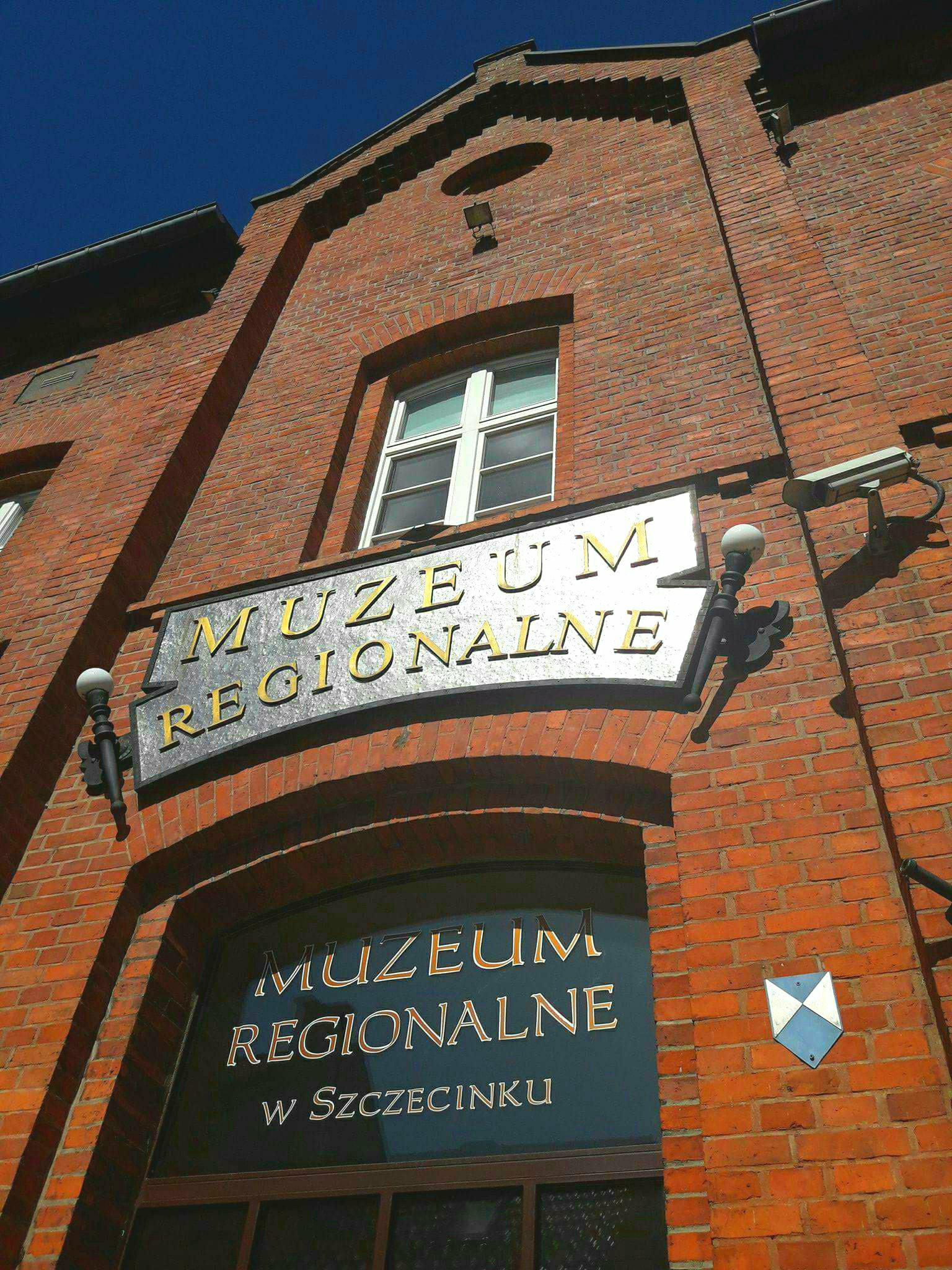
- Museum entrance
- Established: 1914; 112 years ago
- Location: Regional Museum in Szczecinek ul. Szkolna 1, 78-400 Szczecinek, Poland
- Coordinates: 53°42′41″N 16°41′32″E
- Collections: Archaeological, regional, hunting and gold cultural artifacts.
- Director: Ireneusz Markanicz
- Curator: Jadwiga Kowalczyk-Kontowska
- Website: www.muzeum.szczecinek.pl

The Regional Museum in Szczecinek Poland was founded in 1914. From the beginning of the 1970s, the museum specialization was established in three main areas: the art collection regarding the history of the city and the entire West Pomerania, hunting, and goldsmithing. Archaeological collections (ceramics, jewelry, tools), regional collections (painting, sculpture - all related to the city and the region), hunting sets (more than 130 hunting objects: firearms and hand-to-hand combat, hunting gear, accessories and memorabilia for hunting salons), collection of gold artifacts. The most valuable objects are from the eighteenth century. The most known statue in the museum is a stone figure of a Slavic deity that is one of the oldest pieces on exhibition, called "Belbuk"

== History ==
The Regional Museum in Szczecinek dates to 1866 making it one of the oldest museums in Western Pomerania. The museum was created after an archaeological exhibition organized by Prussian major and cryptologist, Fryderyk Wilhelm Krasiski at the armory building (auxiliary formations of the Prussian army) located at the Kosciuszko Street. The exhibition consisted of objects found during excavations conducted by him, including the pile deposits discovered in Parsęca. Until 1881 (until Kasiski's death), the exhibition grew considerably and numbered 702 pieces. After his death the collection was sold and gave rise to the Ethnological Museum (germ. Ethnologisches Museum) in Berlin (Dahlem).

The museum was established half a century later when the historical interests were again enlivened by the ceremonial celebrations of the 600th anniversary of Szczecinek creation in 1910. In the autumn of 1913, mayor K. Sasse, established the Museum Society. The association members included well-known citizens of the city of Szczecinek: K. Tümpel, E. Wille, landrat (head of the county) Ernst von Hertzberg, and painter Paul Stubbe. Thanks to the association of the museum, the museum was established in June 1914, in the tower of St. Nicholas church (remains of the first Christian church in Szczecinek city). The pre-war collection was small but valuable. The works that were exhibited at the time documented the history of the city and of the region. The collection included, among others, the silver goblets donated by princess Ann (from 1606), and princess Jadwiga (from 1625).

The activity of the facility, however, was halted by the outbreak of World War I. Thanks to the efforts of Georg Zehm in 1935, the museum was moved to the castle (Zamek Książąt Pomorskich) in Szczecinek. At the end of World War II, in February 1945, after the city was taken over by the Soviet army, part of the collection was thrown out of the window. Some of these monuments were saved by the Sisters of the Immaculate Conception of the Blessed Virgin Mary. One of them, Maria Krysta, wrote the first post-war booklet devoted to the history of the city.

Restart of the museum in Szczecinek was taken on by Aleksander Stafiński and reverend Anatol Sałaga, who organized the Civic Committee of the Museum in Szczecinek and Szczecinek Land. In July 1947 the tower of St. Nicholas became a temporary headquarters of the museum

In September 1957, the Presidium of the Municipal National Council in Szczecinek established a new Organizing Committee of the Museum. The organization of the museum was also supported by the Szczecinek branch of the Polish Historical Society. On February 28, 1958, during the celebration of the anniversary of the takeover of Szczecinek by the Soviet army, the Regional Museum of Szczecinek was opened. At that moment it was supposed to be located in the church tower of St. Nicholas, but later it was scheduled to be moved to the Castle of Dukes of Pomerania (Zamek Książąt Pomorskich) in Szczecinek. Nevertheless, the exhibition remained at St. Nicholas church until 2006.

Ultimately, thanks to the former mayor of the city, Marian Tomasz Goliński, the museum was moved to the 19th-century building of the former local school. Thanks to the EU grant money, the Ministry of Culture and National Heritage, and the financing from the city of Szczecinek, the building had been adapted for museum purposes. The ceremonial inauguration took place in 2006. The new headquarters is several times bigger than the previous one and it is more functional. Presently a steady increase of the art collection in the museum is possible thanks to the support of mayor Jerzy Hardie-Douglas.

In the words of the Director of the Regional Museum in Szczecinek, Ireneusz Markanicz:

"The main focus of the Regional Museum in Szczecinek is to provide more information about the city architecture and circumstances of the settlers. I believe that these people are our outstanding heroes and thus the history makers. It is also important to remember the frontier roots of those who came here after 1945, since the modern inhabitants of Szczecinek are their descendants, and it is worthwhile to bring this culture closer to the next generations"

In 2014 the Regional Museum in Szczecinek celebrated its 100th anniversary.

== Temporary exhibitions ==
The Regional Museum in Szczecinek reaches out to audiences gathering and presenting valuable collections of important and appreciated artists and other influential figures, among others: artist Wiesław Adamski "In Memoriam", and astronomer Adam Giedrys "Mr. Adam. Szczecinek Tailor-Astronomer." Over the years the museum displayed the art work of other artists: "Stanisław Graczyk, Great Poles"., "Szczecinek in Photography of Zbigniew Gabalis"., "Andrzej Foryś"., Maciej Gaca "Unimportant Drawings of a frivolous Guy"., and many more.

== Permanent exhibitions ==
The Regional Museum in Szczecinek currently holds six permanent exhibitions:

- The History of the City and the Region - painting, sculpture, blacksmith's and goldsmith's products, sacred art: silver liturgical goblets, brass baptism bowls, bell-founding, etc., city maps (from 1844, 1891), city seals, series of the paintings by famous Szczecinek painter, Paul Stubbe: "The Views of Szczecinek" Widoki Szczecinka - 19th/20th century ("The Castle Street", Ulica Zamkowa, "The Houses over Nizica River" Domy nad Niezdobna), The Crucifixion - 1600, Baroque altar candlesticks, bronze bell, all related to the history of the city from the Middle Ages to the present day
- The Noble Room - objects of material culture associated with the Pomeranian nobility: a family of Golzów from Siemczyno, Herzbergs from Lotyń, Podewils from Krąg. The collection includes, among others: 19th century Baroque furniture, a wardrobe and a book cabinet, a table, chairs and armchairs, a Dutch wardrobe, trunks, portraits of members of nobility and views of their residences from the Düncker publishing house (lithography of the Palace in Siemczyno, from the second half of the 19th century, copperplate of Henry von Podewils - after 1696, the sculptures of Roman guards), maps of West Pomerania, including famous "Lubinus map" portraying the Pomeranian Principality by Eilhardus Lubinus (from 1618), etc.
- Szczecinek Garrison - In the Middle Ages Szczecinek was a small town, which did not even have defensive walls. It was not until 1742 that Szczecinek became a garrison town. The pre-war museum had numerous military collections, which, unfortunately, were lost. The new collection was rebuilt with difficulty. The museum has firearms and protective equipment from the 16th to the 20th century. Most of it are weapons from the nineteenth century and from the Swedish and Napoleonic wars. A large model presents the struggle for Szczecinek and its acquisition on February 27, 1945. The collection includes: Polish-Hungarian saber (16th/17th century), infantry rifle with bayonet (from 1777), helmet "Pappenheimer" (17th cent.), etc.
- The Hunting Room - the beginnings of hunting collection is connected with the establishment of the Culture of the Forest (Kultura Lasu) in Szczecinek, in 1966. Its author was the forest man, Józef Macichowski. Today hunters' collection has over 130 objects, including: firearms, hunters' accessories, powder-bags, canes, pipes, snuff boxes, equipment of old hunter's salons: furniture, paintings, graphics, handicraft items: cups, plates, beer mugs, cutlery, etc. (hunter's cupboard, Germany, 19th/20th cent., hunter's silver cup, Gebruder Dingeldein, Hanau, Germany, 19th cent.).
- European goldsmith workshops from the 18th to the 20th centuries
- The Silverware Room (The Old Silver) - The collection dates to 1959 when the local military unit donated a precious gift of a few dozen of silver pieces for the museum. Overall, more than hundred items from the 18th to the beginning of the 20th century in European goldsmith workshops. A large increase in the collection took place after 1976 when it was considered one of the museum's leading specializations. In 1993, the NBP in Warsaw donated several dozens of silver pieces to the museum, including works created by masters: K.F. Malcz, T. Werner, and others. The silver collection comes mostly from Germany and Poland, but also from Russia, Austria and France (the sugar bowl Moscow, Russia, 1893, soup tureen with a cover, Berlin, Prussia, after 1888).
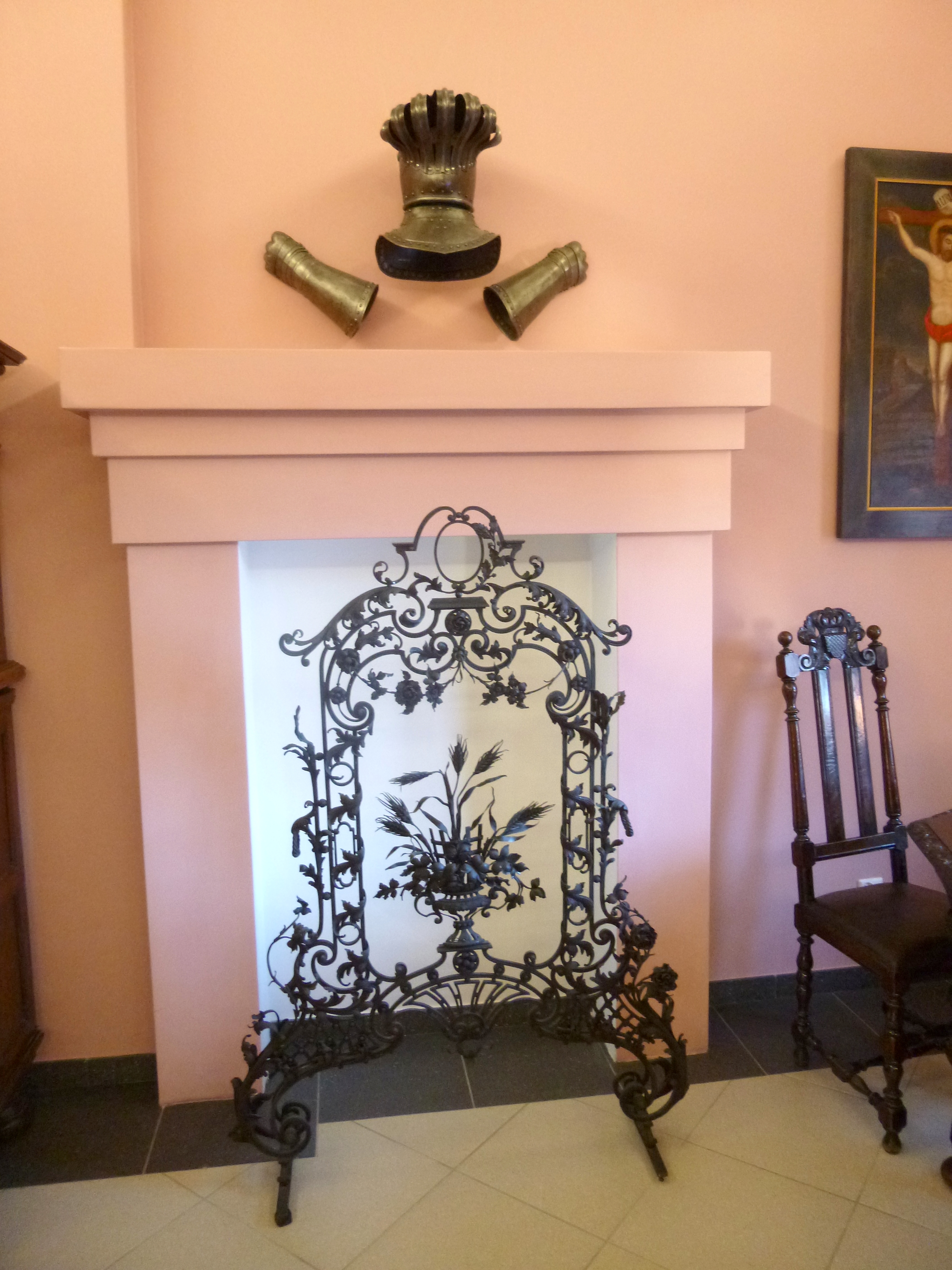
The Noble Room in the Regional Museum in Szczecinek

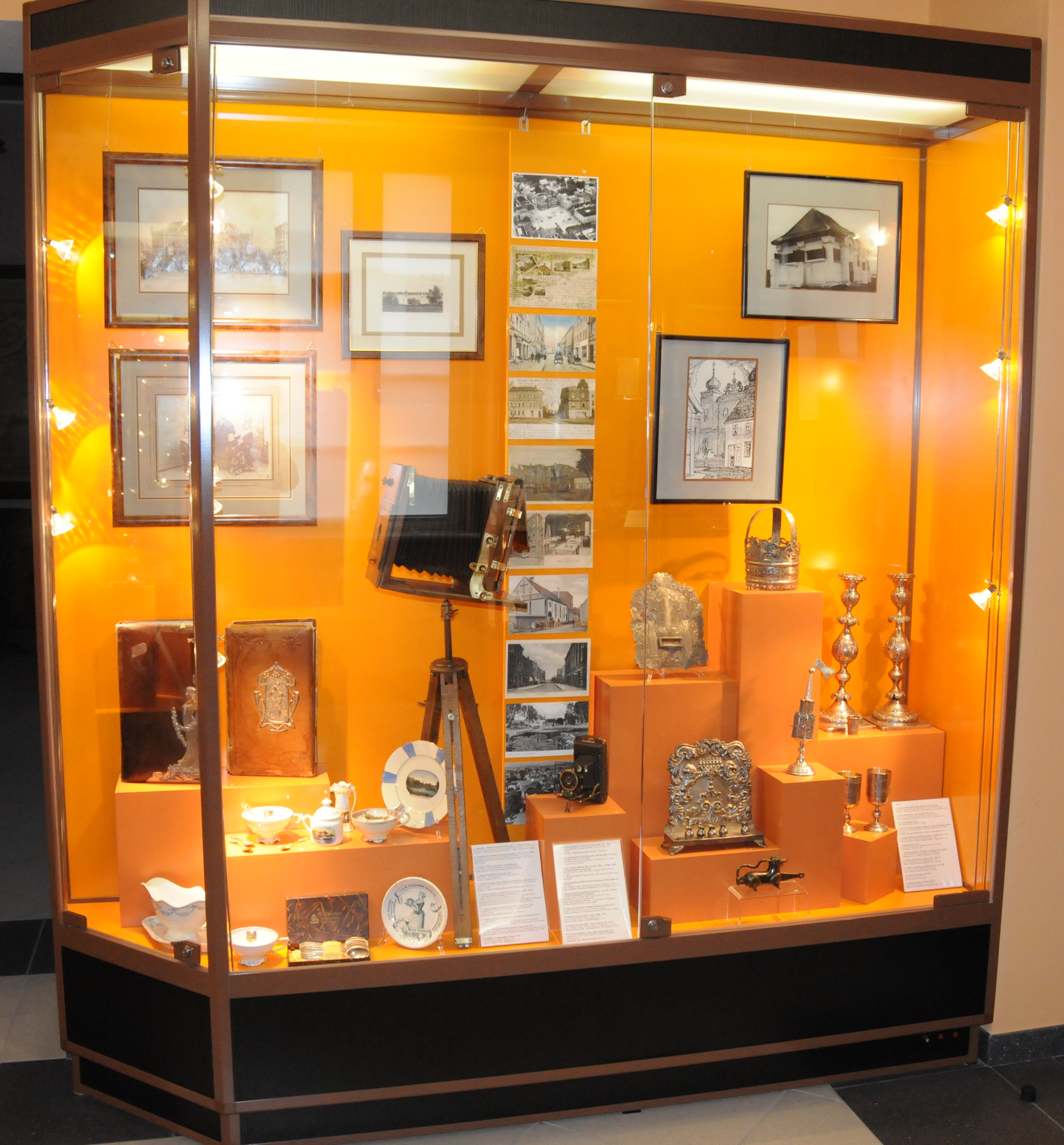
The Regional Room in Regional Museum in Szczecinek

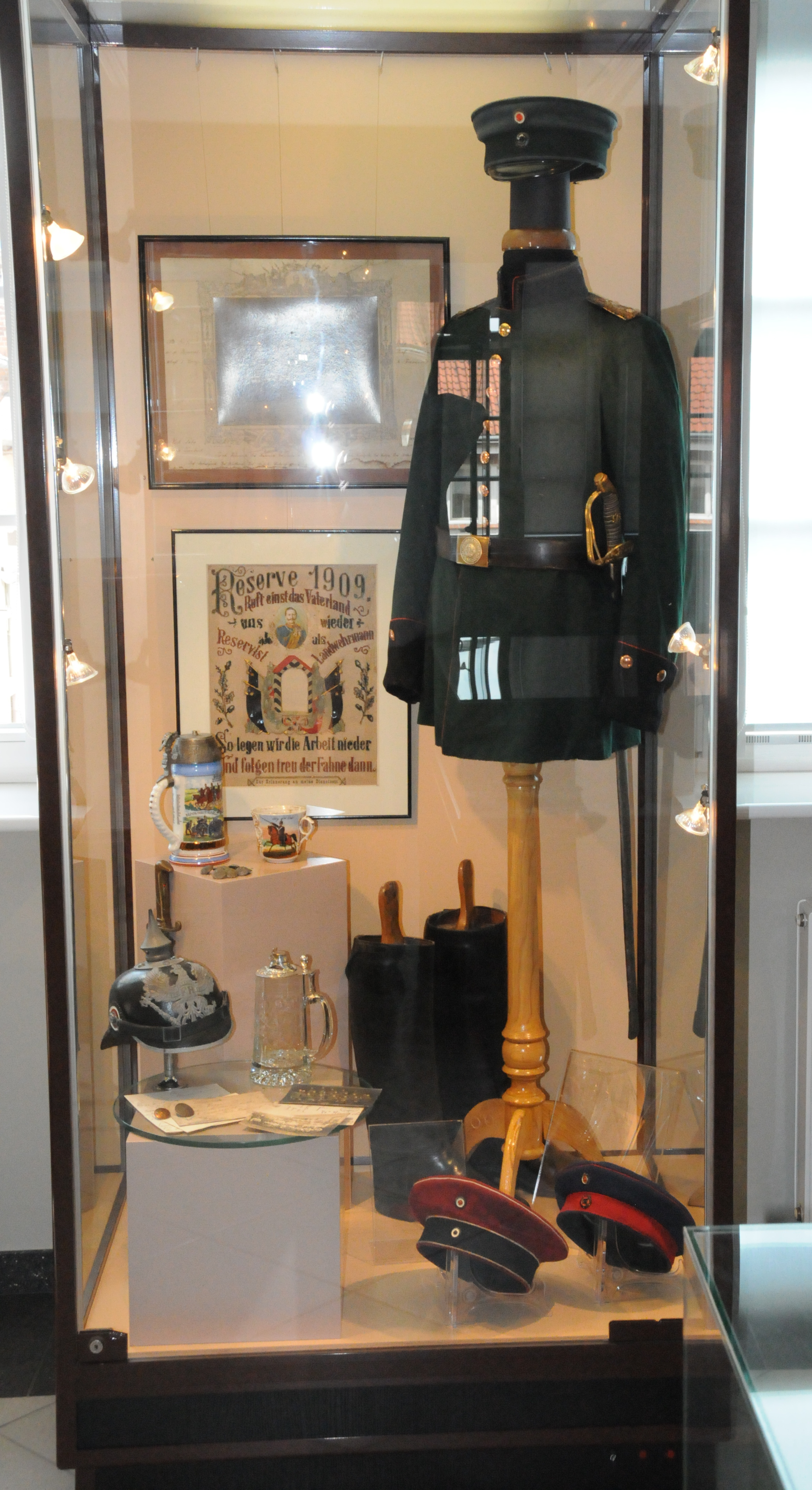
The Garrison Room in the Regional Museum in Szczecinek

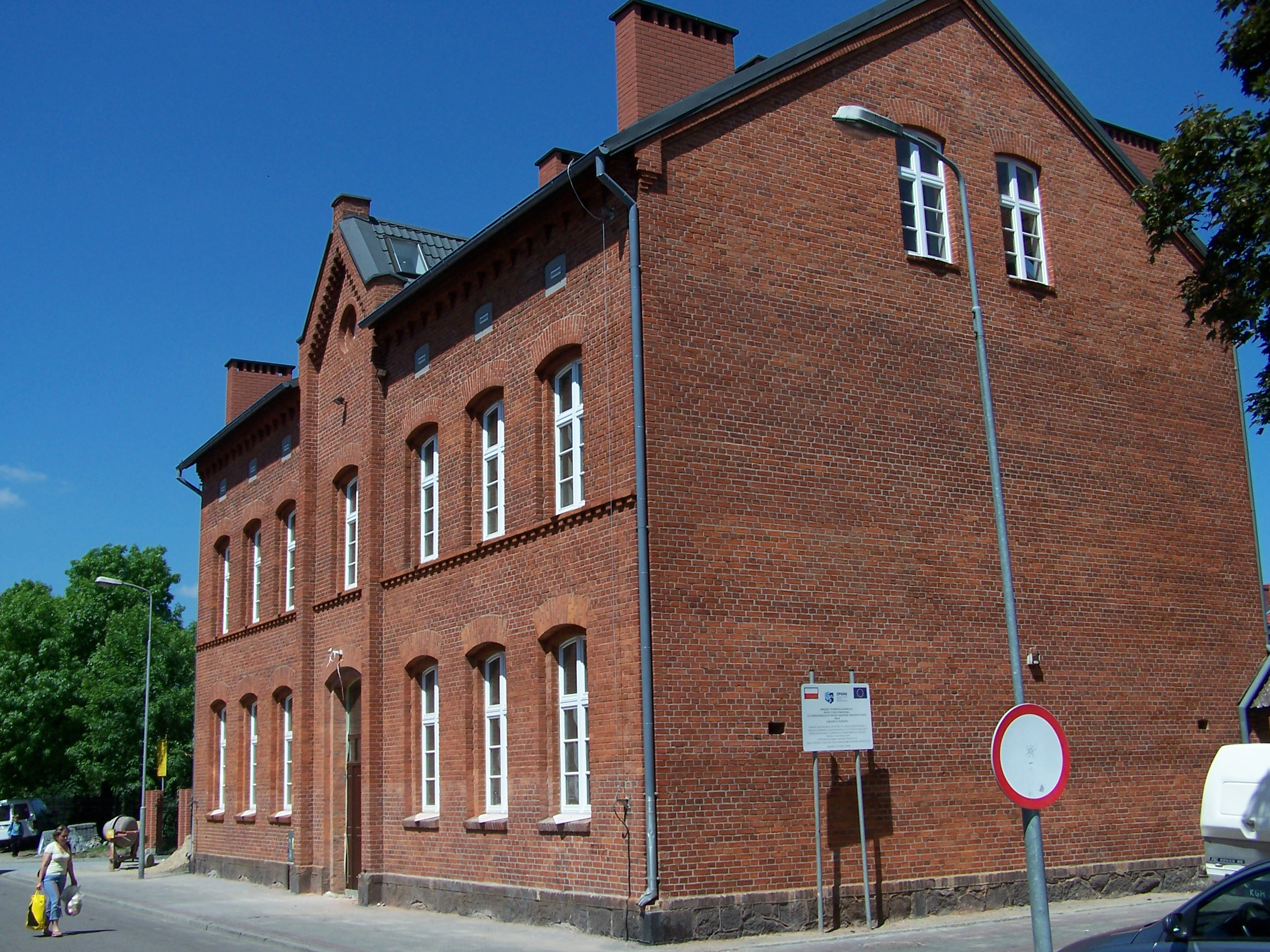
Regional Museum in Szczecinek building

== Bibliography ==
- "100 Years of the Museum in Szczecinek - Guide to Permanent Exhibitions of the Regional Museum in Szczecinek" (100 lat muzeum w Szczecinku - Przewodnik po wystawach stałych Muzeum Regionalnego w Szczecinku), Jerzy Dudź, 2014, Szczecinek.
- "Visiting the Castle of Prince Warcisław" (Na zamku księcia Warcisława), Bogdan Urbanek, 2016, Szczecinek.
- "Szczecinek, Historical Guide (Szczecinek Przewodnik historyczny), Jerzy Dudź, 2004, Szczecinek.
- "My Town, Known - Unknown" (Moje miasto, Znane - nieznane), Jerzy Gasiul, 2011, Szczecinek.
