= Budy Sułkowskie, Grójec County =

Budy Sułkowskie
- Village
- Location within Poland
- Coordinates: 51°56′8″N 21°4′49″E
- Country: Poland
- Voivodeship: Masovian
- County: Grójec
- Gmina: Chynów

Budy Sułkowskie [ˈbudɨ suu̯ˈkɔfskʲɛ] is a village in the administrative district of Gmina Chynów, within Grójec County, Masovian Voivodeship, in east-central Poland.
