= Drwalew, Masovian Voivodeship =

Drwalew
- Village
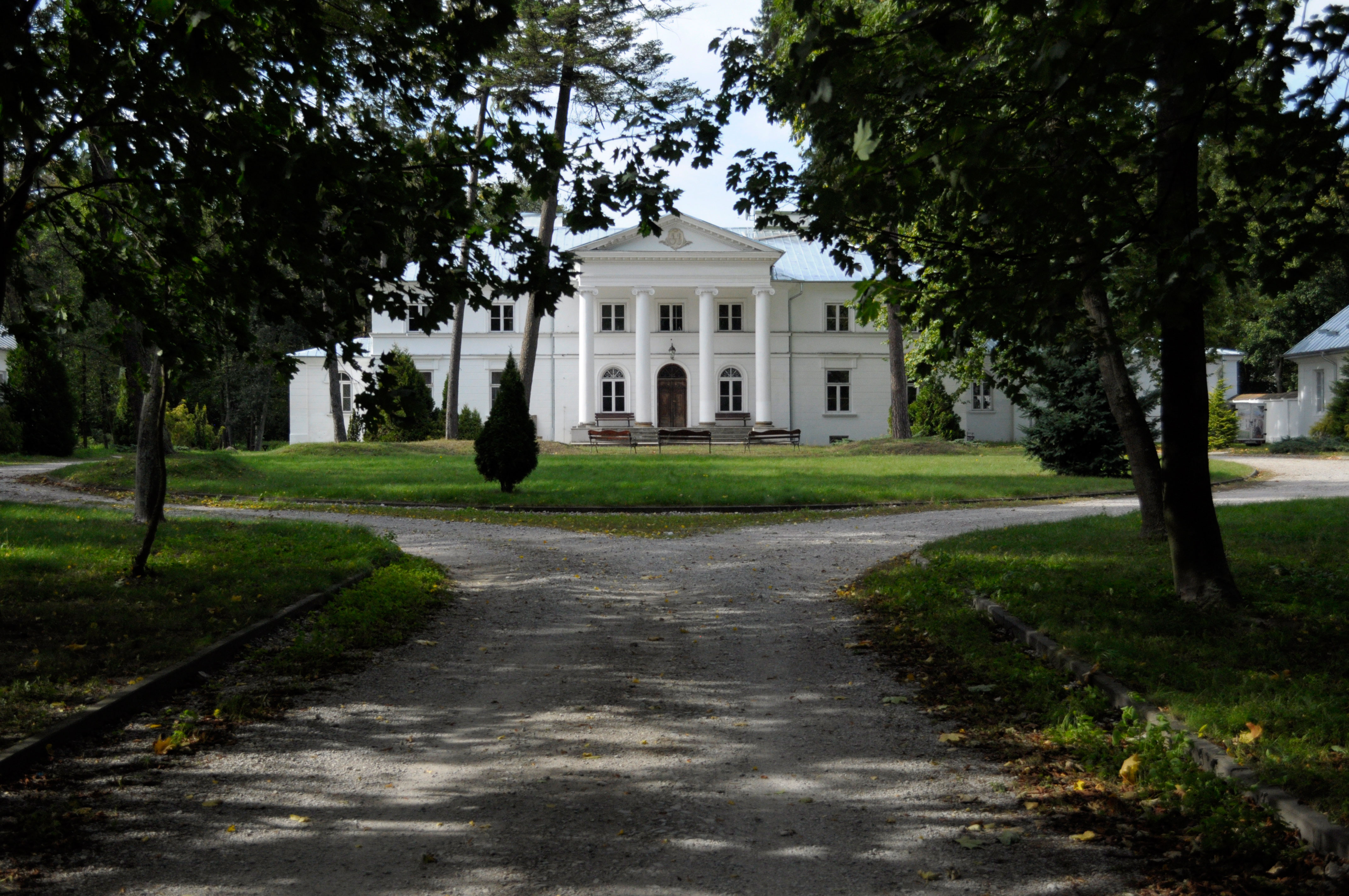
- Palace in Drwalew

- Location within Poland
- Coordinates: 51°53′48″N 21°1′20″E
- Country: Poland
- Voivodeship: Masovian
- County: Grójec
- Gmina: Chynów

Population
  - Total: 1,091
- Time zone: UTC+1 (CET)
  - Summer (DST): UTC+2 (CEST)

Drwalew [ˈdrvalɛf] is a village in the administrative district of Gmina Chynów, within Grójec County, Masovian Voivodeship, in east-central Poland.

Eight Polish citizens were murdered by Nazi Germany in the village during World War II.
