= Wola Pieczyska =

- Village
- Location within Poland
- Coordinates: 51°55′8″N 21°3′12″E
- Country: Poland
- Voivodeship: Masovian
- County: Grójec
- Gmina: Chynów

Wola Pieczyska [ˈvɔla pjɛˈt͡ʂɨska] is a village in the administrative district of Gmina Chynów, within Grójec County, Masovian Voivodeship, in east-central Poland.
