= Marianów, Gmina Chynów =

Marianów
- Village
- Location within Poland
- Coordinates: 51°55′20″N 21°00′27″E
- Country: Poland
- Voivodeship: Masovian
- County: Grójec
- Gmina: Chynów

Marianów [maˈrjanuf] is a village in the administrative district of Gmina Chynów, within Grójec County, Masovian Voivodeship, in east-central Poland.
