= Budziszynek =

- Village
- Location within Poland
- Coordinates: 51°51′44″N 21°3′42″E
- Country: Poland
- Voivodeship: Masovian
- County: Grójec
- Gmina: Chynów
- Elevation: 136 m (446 ft)
- Population: 200

Budziszynek [bud͡ʑiˈʂɨnɛk] is a village in the administrative district of Gmina Chynów, within Grójec County, Masovian Voivodeship, in east-central Poland.
