= Żyrów =

- Village
- Location within Poland
- Coordinates: 51°53′9″N 20°58′1″E
- Country: Poland
- Voivodeship: Masovian
- County: Grójec
- Gmina: Chynów
- Population: 250

Żyrów [ˈʐɨruf] is a village in the administrative district of Gmina Chynów, within Grójec County, Masovian Voivodeship, in east-central Poland.
