= Ludwików, Grójec County =

Ludwików
- Village
- Location within Poland
- Coordinates: 51°55′33″N 21°10′49″E
- Country: Poland
- Voivodeship: Masovian
- County: Grójec
- Gmina: Chynów

Ludwików [ludˈvikuf] is a village in the administrative district of Gmina Chynów, within Grójec County, Masovian Voivodeship, in east-central Poland.
