= Machcin, Masovian Voivodeship =

Machcin
- Village
- Location within Poland
- Coordinates: 51°55′N 21°9′E
- Country: Poland
- Voivodeship: Masovian
- County: Grójec
- Gmina: Chynów

Machcin [ˈmaxt͡ɕin] is a village in the administrative district of Gmina Chynów, within Grójec County, Masovian Voivodeship, in east-central Poland.
