= Rzeczyca, Gmina Ulhówek =

Rzeczyca
- Village
- Location within Poland
- Coordinates: 50°26′59″N 23°44′46″E
- Country: Poland
- Voivodeship: Lublin
- County: Tomaszów
- Gmina: Ulhówek

Population
  - Total: 260
- Time zone: UTC+1 (CET)
  - Summer (DST): UTC+2 (CEST)
- Vehicle registration: LTM

Rzeczyca [ʐɛˈt͡ʂɨt͡sa] is a village in the administrative district of Gmina Ulhówek, within Tomaszów County, Lublin Voivodeship, in eastern Poland, close to the border with Ukraine. The village is located in the historical region Galicia.

== History ==
In 1857 the village was bought by Wincenty Szweycer.

Following the German-Soviet invasion of Poland, which started World War II in September 1939, the village was occupied by Germany until 1944. On 27 March 1944, the Ukrainian Insurgent Army attacked the village and massacred 34 Poles, men, women and children, as young as four. In January 1947, the Ukrainian Insurgent Army kidnapped and murdered a Polish woman from the village.
