= Chynów, Masovian Voivodeship =

Chynów
- Village
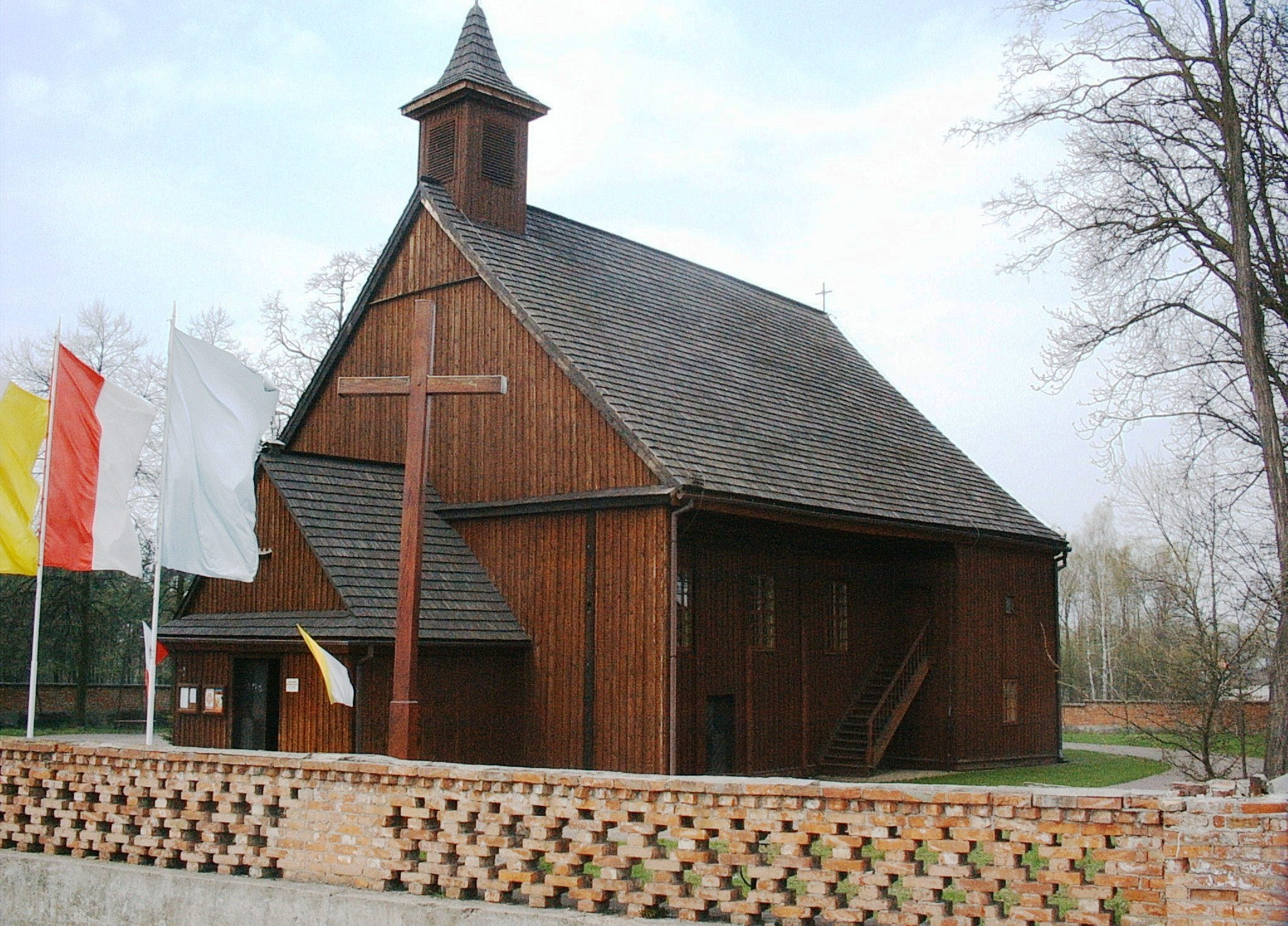
- Church of Holy Trinity

- Coat of arms

- Location within Poland
- Coordinates: 51°54′23″N 21°5′5″E
- Country: Poland
- Voivodeship: Masovian
- County: Grójec
- Gmina: Chynów

Population
  - Total: 1,050
- Website: http://www.chynow.pl

Chynów [ˈxɨnuf] is a village in Grójec County, Masovian Voivodeship, in east-central Poland. It is the seat of the gmina (administrative district) called Gmina Chynów.
