= Piekut =

Piekut, Poland
- Village
- Location within Poland
- Coordinates: 51°52′55″N 21°8′4″E
- Country: Poland
- Voivodeship: Masovian
- County: Grójec
- Gmina: Chynów

Piekut [ˈpjɛkut] is a village in the administrative district of Gmina Chynów, within Grójec County, Masovian Voivodeship, in east-central Poland.
