= Wiesław Adamski =

Polish sculptor

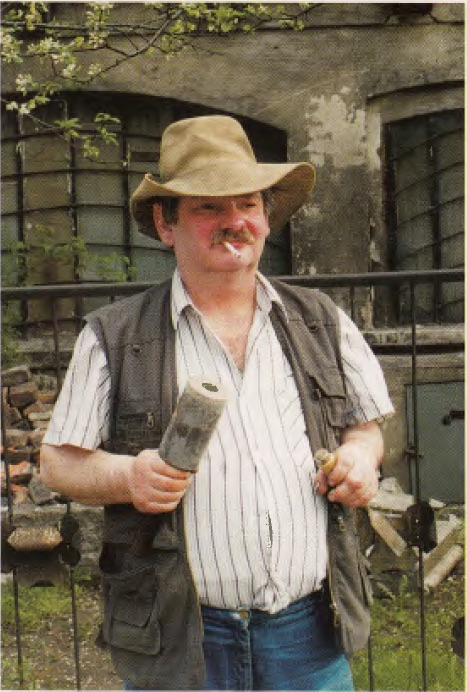
- Born: Wiesław Adamski; 26 July 1947; Wierzchowo, Poland
- Died: 10 February 2017 (aged 69); Wałcz, Poland
- Resting place: Szczecinek, Poland
- Education: State High School of Fine Arts in Szczecin; University of Fine Arts in Poznań, Poland
- Known for: Sculpture, painting, metalwork, blacksmithing, drawing, scenic design, interior design
- Notable work: The monument of Józef Piłsudski in Szczecinek, Poland; "Potato" statue in Biesiekierz, Poland; The Steps to the White House; "King's Head" Monument in Biesiekierz, Poland; Triptych Leon's life in Three Acts: 1. Latrine, 2. Office (Bureau), 3. Asylum; Daily life in Dachau; Idea. Dante's vehicle; Winged
- Movement: Abstract art, figurative art
- Awards: "Griffin for his Children" (Gryf swoim dzieciom), Szczecin, Poland, 2002; "Honorary Silver Badge of West Pomeranian Griffin" (Odznaka Honorowa Gryfa Zachodniopomorskiego), 2012

Wiesław Adamski (26 July 1947 – 10 February 2017) was a Polish sculptor. He was born in Wierzchowo.

== Biography ==
Adamski, who used to live in Szczecinek, graduated from State High School of Fine Arts in Szczecin, and then studied at the Sculpture Department of the University of Fine Arts in Poznań. He specialized in small sculptures, medals, portraits and blacksmithing. He was an art teacher, caricaturist, illustrator of books and magazines, and a humanist. Adamski's works were exhibited, among others, in: Helsinki, Poltava, Berlin, Madrid, Washington DC, Philadelphia and Paris. The artist's works of art can be found in the Erasmus Gallery in Rotterdam, the Art Gallery in Ravenna, the Regional Museum in Szczecinek, in Eutin, Germany, and in the National Museum in Warsaw. He made, among others, a giant potato monument (with a total height of 3.95 m, frame – 9 m high) in Biesiekierz near Koszalin, a series of medals on the 700th anniversary of Szczecinek, state emblem – an eagle on the monument commemorating the Pomeranian Emblem Winners, bas-relief of an eagle on the building of the Szczecin court and the now defunct monument "Fallen in Defense of the People's Power in Central Pomerania in the Years 1945–1952". In 1969 he was a member of the Awards Committee of the Ministry of Culture and Art.

The most significant event in his artistic output is mentioned as the great European exhibition at the Museum of Skills in Rotterdam, where his triptych in marble and bronze: "Leon's life in Three Acts: 1. Latrine, 2. Office (Bureau), 3. Asylum" was displayed next to the works of Rembrandt, Rubens, Hasior and Abakanowicz. He won twice, in 1981 and 1985, an extremely prestigious Polish National Biennale of Small Sculptural Forms, as well as he was twice a scholarship holder of the Minister of Culture and Art (in 1982 and 1990). In 1979 he received "The Seahorse" (Konik Morski) award for the sculpture "Shipyard", then in 2000 the main prize in the National Competition for the Protection of the Natural Environment, and two years later – again the first prize in the same competition. He was repeatedly invited to participate in exhibitions at the Centro Dantesco dei Frati Minori Conventuali museum in Ravenna, Italy, where he won numerous awards. Many of his works of art have been bought by Polish and international museums, including the sculpture: “Collection” – bought during the Inter Art exhibition in Poznań, or the sculpture: "Pegasus for sale" – purchased by the National Museum in Bratislava. "The Steps to the White House" was sold to the President of the United States, and the Madrid Museum of Sport (Museo del Deporte) presents the sculpture: "The Sports Fan". The potato monument in Biesiekierz was hailed by American people the largest potato in the world in the 1980s and appears in the coat of arms of the region. He received the "Accomplished for Culture" (Zasłużony dla Kultury) badge three times. In 1975 he became a member of the Koszalin ZPAP Branch. He was also a member of the Association of Polish Artists of the Szczecin District. His achievements were appreciated during the exhibition in Memoriam, on the first anniversary of the artist's death, at the Regional Museum in Szczecinek in 2018.

== Childhood and youth ==
Artist's parents, Janina and Tadeusz Adamscy, came from the Warsaw region. During the occupation, Adamski's parents gave shelter to an old Jewish woman in their apartment, for which Adamski's mother was placed in front of the firing squad. She escaped by chance from the hands of German soldiers. The artist's parents came from the ruined capital, to the recovered territories north of Poland, where they ran a private meat factory and a butcher shop. Wiesław Adamski was born in Wierzchowo. The artist often visited his grandfather – also an artist – in Magdalenka near Warsaw, and his grandmother in Pieczyska near Grójec, where he spent his early childhood. He came to Szczecinek in 1951. He attended primary school No. 1 at Wazów Square. At a very young age, he was interested in literature, philosophy and mythology. At the age of 7, he read "The Knights of the Cross" and "Trilogy" written by Henryk Sienkiewicz. For the rest of his life he remained an erudite, a learned man with extensive knowledge in all areas of life. He was admitted to primary school a year earlier. After primary school he became a student at the High School of Art in Lublin, which was located in the Old Town, near the castle, in Grodzka Gate. In 1966 he graduated from the State High School of Fine Arts in Szczecin. In 1968, Wiesław Adamski began studying at the University of Fine Arts in Poznań under the wings of professors: Olgierd Truszczyński and Magdalena Więcek-Wnuk. He received his diploma with honors in 1973. He belonged to the group of the most talented students, he already had several significant successes and exhibitions in his artistic achievements. At the university, he was hailed as "Michael Angelo" by other students. He was offered to stay at the university and to carry out a scientific work. In 1975 he became a member of the ZPAP branch of Koszalin, and in 1977 he received permission to use the existing studio of an artist Piotr Gendzel who went to live in Manchester, at 59 Wyszynski Street (then Marshal Zhukov Street).

== Style of work ==
Adamski liked to work using natural materials such as metal, granite, bronze, wood, and marble. He started his artistic life as a painter. His first painting was created in the early 70's (at the beginning of his studies), and it portrayed the garden landscape of his parents on the former School Street. Like all of the sculptors he recognized Michelangelo's genius and perfection, however he was greatly impressed by the works of the English sculptor and illustrator Henry Spencer Moore. In the 1960s Adamski had an opportunity to move and set his sculptures at an exhibition, which in those years, was an artistic event in the capital of Western Pomerania. Moore's figurative and abstract compositions had a great impact on his work during his studies at the High School of Art in Szczecin. Fascination with Moore offered him a direction in his work. Moore's greatest influence in Adamski's art can be seen in his sculpture: "Antigone." He was interested in form, the introduction of metaphor in figural sculpture. His sculptures were a symbol of the truth about man and the environment that man creates. The greatest inspiration for the artist was God who created the world and nature. During an exhibition at the Gallery of the Baltic Dramatic Theater in Koszalin "Foyer", in 1999, the artist stated:

"The first sculptor in the world was God (...) The artist is approaching the ideal of the Creator".

Nature as the perfect work of the artist – God – is visible in many of Adamski's works, which can be seen in sculptures depicting an ant: "Agony", "Concert," Desire "," Searching for Life "," Die Ameisen (Ants) ".

== Exhibitions in Poland, private exhibitions ==
- 1979 – Szczecin-Young Artists of the Coast.
- 1979 – Szczecin – "Seahorse"
- 1981 – Koszalin-Słupsk "Work of the Year"
- 1983 – Biennale of Small Sculptural Forms-Poznań
- 1983 – Tbilisi, Poltava, Baku-Exhibition of Small Form
- 1983 – Spring Salon- Koszalin
- 1985 – Biennale of Small Sculptural Forms-Poznań
- 1986 – Triennial of Portrait Sculpture-Sopot
- 1986 – Spring Salon-Koszalin
- 1987 – Art Confrontations of Northern Poland-Elbląg
- 1987 – Winter Salon-Warsaw
- 1987 – Interart – Poznań
- 1989 – Zachęta-Warsaw, National Exhibition of Contemporary Sculpture.
- 1989 – Triennial of Portrait Sculpture-Sopot.
- 1989 – Koszalin – Baltic Theater – individual exhibition
- 1996 – European Laboratory of Art- Tuchomie
- 1997 – Figure of the Sculptors-Orońsko.
- 1998 – Near and distant – Szczecinek.
- 1999 – Summary of the 20th Century Sculpture – Orońsko.
- 1999 – Individual exhibition of one sculpture -PKO-Szczecin
- 2000 – National Sculpture Exhibition (Environmental Protection)
- 2002 – BWA-Szczecin, 30th anniversary of the author's creation (individual exhibition).
- 2002 – Gallery of the Szczecin Center of Culture ART "Exhibition after years"
- 2004 – Open-Air-the Oncological Hospital in Golęcin, Szczecin-2004.
- 2008 – Sculpture Exhibition of the Szczecin-Włocławek Environment.
- 2002 – International Open Air in Buk.
- 2018 – In Memoriam, exhibition at the Regional Museum in Szczecinek on the first anniversary of artist's death

== Exhibitions outside of Poland ==
- 1974 – Neubrandenburg, outdoor sculpture "Swallow"
- 1978 – Washington, "The Steps to the White House "
- 1980 – Centro Dantesco, Ravenna," Dante's carriage "
- 1982 – Centro Dantesco, Ravenna, "Saint Francis and Dante"
- 1983 – Tbilisi, Baku, Poltava, participation in exhibitions of small forms.
- 1987 – Erasmus University of Rotterdam- Polish Art, "The Bridge Linking East and West".
- 1988 – Stadsmuseum Woerden, "Tentoonstelling Poolse Kunst – 1988".
- 1988 – "Brug tussen Oost en West", Hedendaagse Poolse Kunst 1988.
- 1988 – Budapest – Galerie Vigado Lengyel Kispla Sztika.
- 1990 – Museum oud – Rijnsburg
- 1997 – Hungary (Balaton) "Acrobats" outdoor sculpture.
- 1997 – Participation in the Biennale in Ravenna, in the years 1973–1996.
- 1997 – Dante in Poland
- 1998 – "Close and Far Away" – Bergen op Zoom, the Netherlands.
- 2007 – Exhibitions of the Szczecin Environment in Swerin, Neubrandenburg, Unde Miinde.

== Some awards ==
- 1979 – I Seahorse Award for the sculpture "Shipyard", Szczecin
- 1981 – III Biennale of Small Sculptural Forms-Poznań, "Apotheosis of Power"
- 1981 – Work of the Year for the sculpture "The Bird", the Department of Culture and Art in Koszalin (audience award)
- 1985 – 5th Biennale of Small Sculptural Forms, "The Steps to the White House ", Poznań
- 1985 – Work of the Year, "Birth of Life", Koszalin-Słupsk, including the prize for a drawing.
- 2000 – I prize of the Marshal of the West Pomeranian Voivodeship, Szczecin, for the sculpture "Agony"
- 2012 – Honorary Silver Badge of West Pomeranian Griffin (Szczecinek)

== Versatility of creative work: metalwork, sketches, projects, illustrations ==
Adamski's creative work went beyond painting and sculpture. The artist possessed versatile talent. His creative work included: a monumental sculpture and a small form, including statuettes and plaques, medals, portraits ("The Scout, Black Thirteen").

In the applied art and metalwork the artist created: lamps and chandeliers, showcases and signboards (Szczecinek Cultural Center), forged flags (Pomeranian Dukes' Castle in Szczecin), bas-reliefs (eagles for the District Court in Koszalin), information boards, balustrades, doors, forged gates and iron fittings for gates (Industrial Historic Granary in Szczecinek). Religious subject included: roadside shrines, altars, candles, tabernacles and crosses for churches (Mother of God Queen of Poland in Grzmiąca).

Adamski was also an interior and exterior designer. Among his projects were: space planning (club Petit Palais in Breuil-Cervinia), small architectural form, landscape and land development (Jordan Garden in Szczecinek on Sadowa Street), furniture, stucco, stonework, roof structures, kiosks and gazebos, as well as the façade patterning and colors. His work consisted also of: the fountains ("Two Bream" and "The Sturgeon" in Szczecinek), artistic tombstones (for the mother of the fashion designer Eva Minge), and chapels (to the Virgin Mary in Jazłowiec). He also created sketches ("A Toad" (Der krötersitz)," Faun and Euridice" and" Prélude à l'après-midi d'un faune"(Afternoon of a Faun), illustrations for books and newspapers ("Silver thoughts and Words", by Bogdan Urbanek 2015).

== Last years of life ==
Adamski created his works of art for over 40 years. He made many works in his art studio, including those that decorated and decorate, until today, his hometown and other cities in his home country: a monument of Józef Piłsudski, a plaque commemorating the Katyń massacre, a 700th anniversary plaque with Warcisław IV on the wall of the Town Hall in Szczecinek, water fountains on the city promenade, Gryffin on the building at Koszalińska Street, Halberds for the City Hall, Signposts showing direction to friendly countries. Other art works included no longer existing pharmacy sign with the Aesculapius symbol, and the door to the Szczecinek Cultural Center, which Günter Grass called "The Gate to the Temple of Art". Wiesław Adamski closed his sculpture and metalwork workshop in 2016. After that he devoted himself to his work as a cartoonist and caricaturist. He was also involved in the teaching of drawing and painting, and magnificent artists came out of his wings, including Marta Dudź, Dorota Dziekiewicz-Pilich and many others. At that time Wiesław Adamski also dedicated himself, together with his friend Henryk Gaszkowski, to counteracting bureaucracy, simplifying the activities of the officials, and improving the quality of life of the residents. His sculpture, "Citizen Włapko", is still a symbol of corruption, which he considered the inevitable result of bureaucracy. Artist's dream was to finish the figurines depicting the truth about the man in the form of grotesque (good / bad, beautiful / ugly, funny / serious, etc.) The series began with the figurine "Epigram with a Pear", which he presented in the 80s at the exhibition in Tbilisi. The artist died of a stroke, on 10 February 2017, in the hospital in Wałcz at the age of 69. He was buried, at his request, between his parents at the cemetery in Szczecinek. His last unfinished work is the prototype of "The Battle of Kępa Oksywska".

== Opinions about the artist ==
During the broadcast at the Polish Radio Koszalin, the painter Wiesława Markiewicz, admitted that the artist was known in the artistic environment as "knowledgeable on technology. (...) He was admired and treated in a masterful way."

Stanisław Biżek described Adamski as: "unique talent, great artist. Beautiful figure."

Ryszard Kul said that: "Adamski having a task, an idea, a thought has a great ease and a vision of the form, and of the mass of the material". Wiesław Adamski creates his sculptures not on the basis of "what will I get out of it", but based on what the creator assumed, what he wanted to achieve. In a bas-relief in which he is a master,(...) he captures the character of the person. These are not dead works."

== Selected works of Wiesław Adamski ==
- Monument of Józef Piłsudski in Szczecinek
- Stairs to the White House (also known as: Kremlin stairs)
- Justice
- Birth of life
- "Don Quixote", painting
- Von Moltke Countess, painting
- Love in the Face of God: Dante and Beatrice
- Daily Life in Dachau
- Agony (also known as: "Ant")
- The Speaker
- The Rams (in Budzistowo near Kołobrzeg)
- Potato Monument in Biesiekierz
- Concert
- Antigone
- Idol Enface
- Dove of Peace
- Idea. Dante's Vehicle
- "King's Head" monument (also known as: "The King Who Has Buried his Neck")
- Citizen Włapko
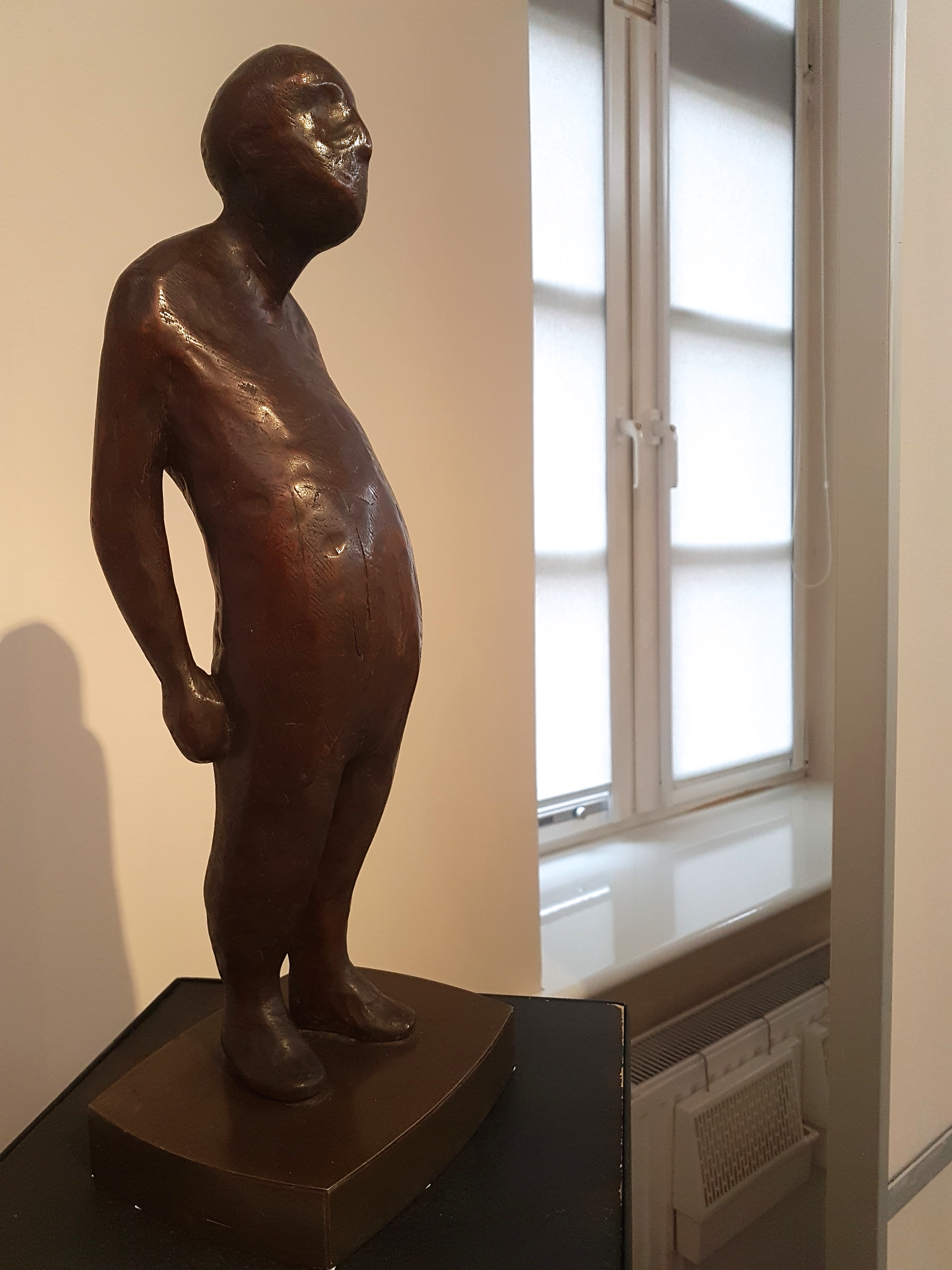
Me

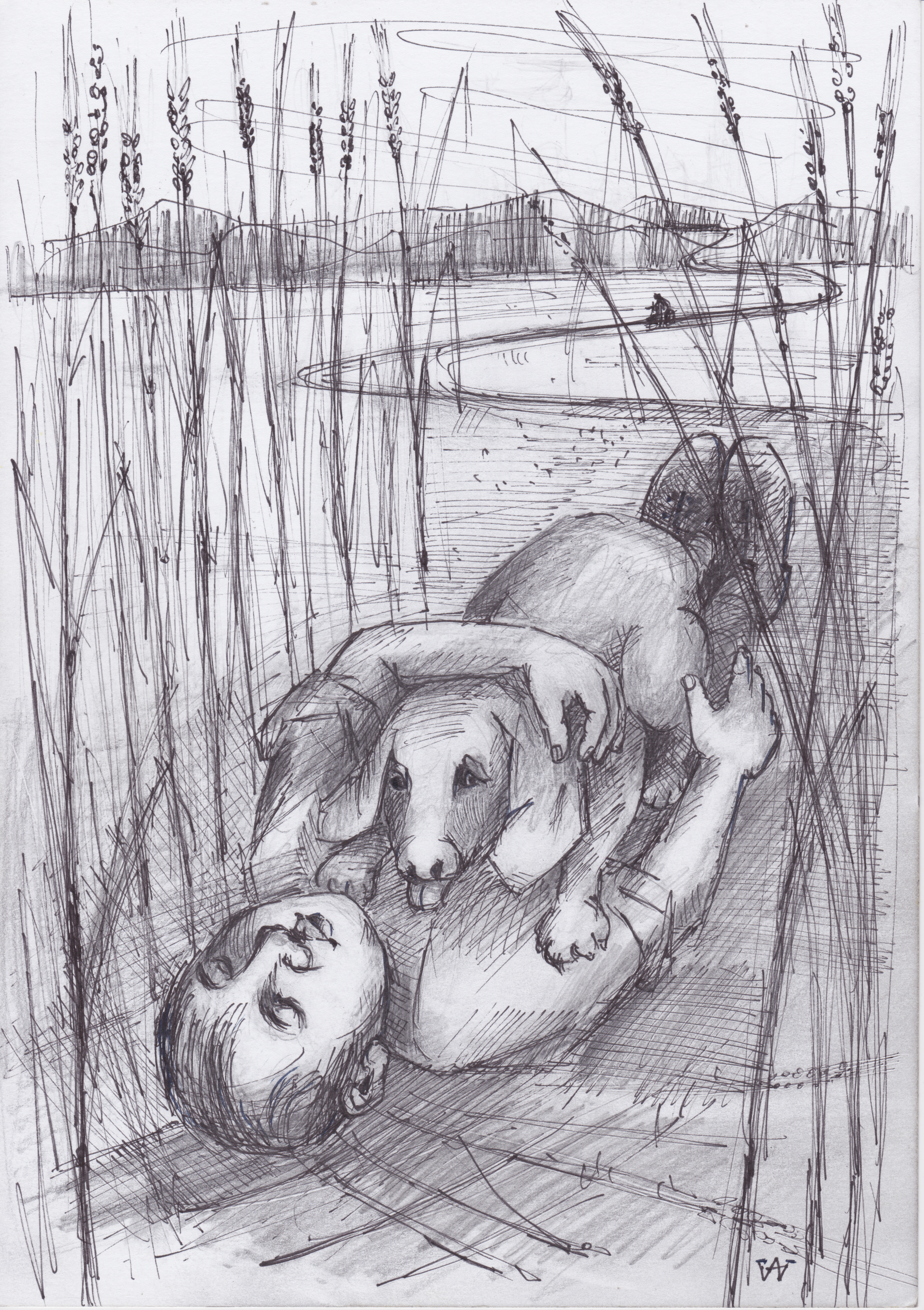
A Boy and his Dog

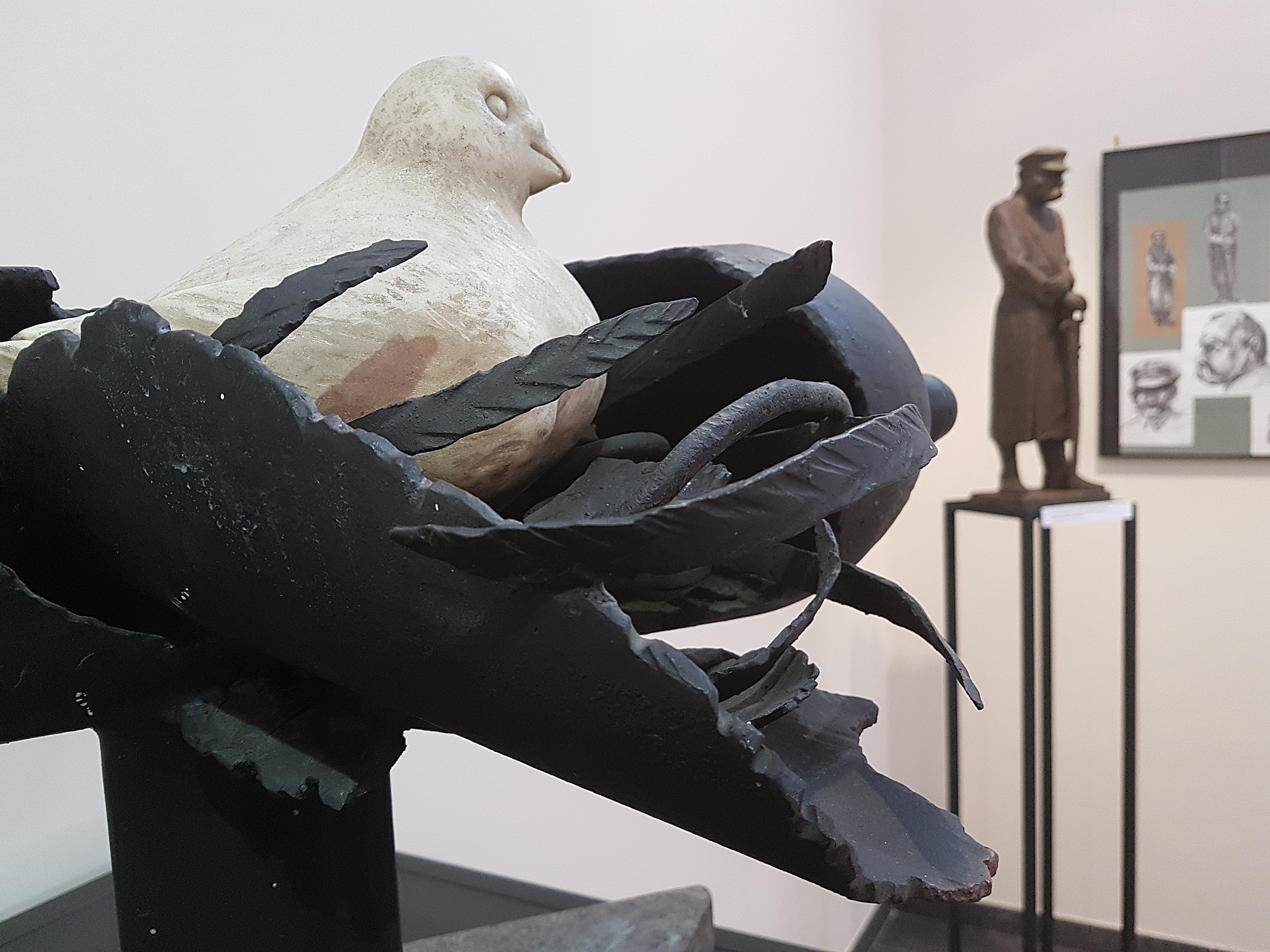
A Dove

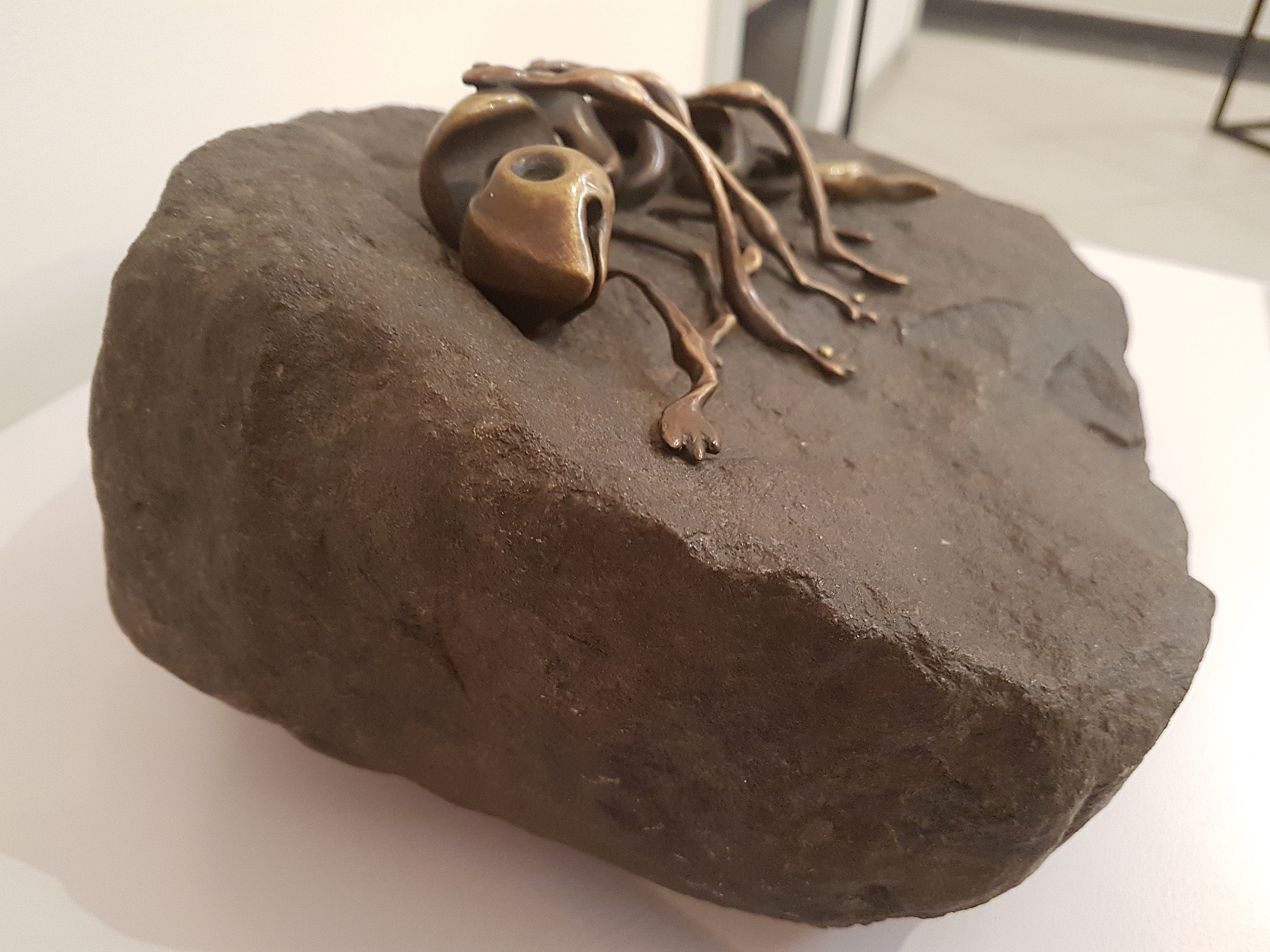
Agony

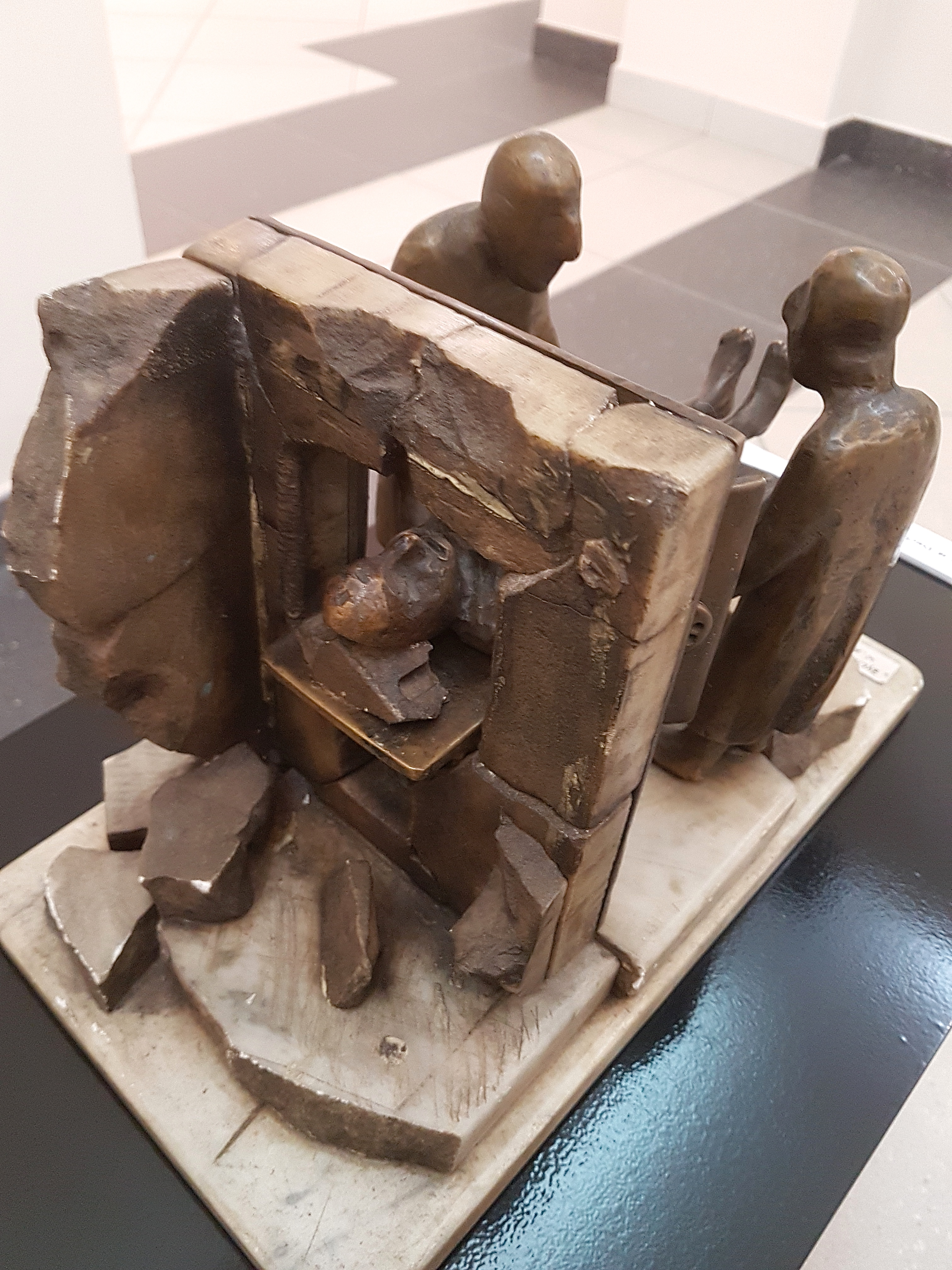
Everyday Life in Dachau

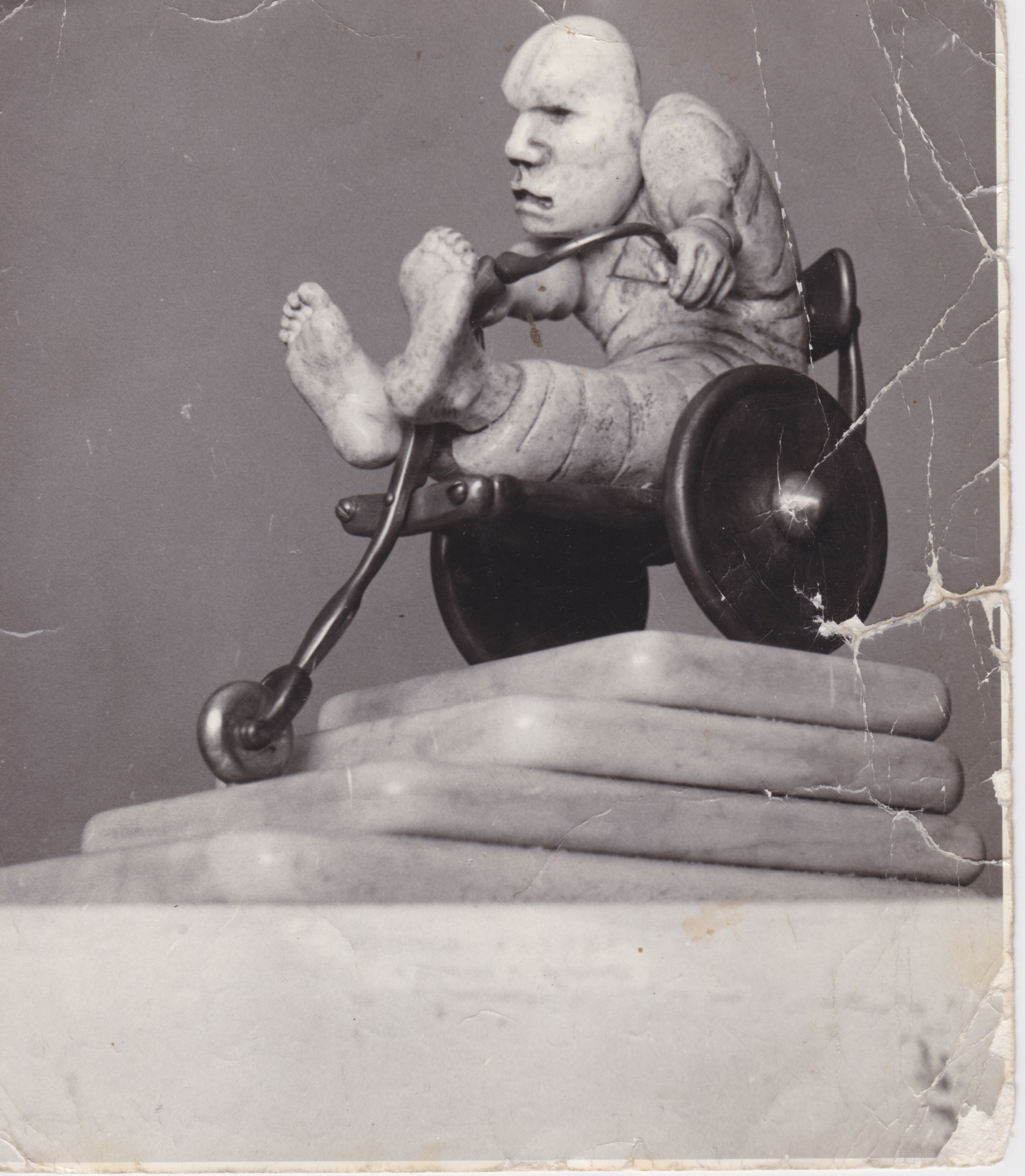
The Steps to the White House

== Publications ==
- Ryszard Kul, Andrzej A. Waśkiewicz Gdańsk Society of Friends of Arts, Galeria Punkt, 2002, p. 27
- Association of Polish Artists, Wiesław Adamski. The Sculpture
- Association of Polish Artists, The Sculpture section of the Szczecin District, Outdoor Sculpture, 2004
- Association of Polish Artists, Ecology, National Sculpture Exhibition, Natural Environment Protection, 2000

== Bibliography ==
- "The Story of a Potato", Wiesław Adamski – Interview, Polskie Radio Koszalin, by Jolanta Rudnik, 1998, Koszalin.
- Wiesław Adamski, "Sculpture", Association of Polish Visual Artists, Introduction to the exhibition catalog, Ryszard Kul, Szczecin.
- Bogdan Urbanek, "Saved in memory and our Contemporaries" (Szczecin's Who's Who), SAPiK Publishing House, p. 15, (Wiesław Adamski's biography), 2010, Szczecinek.
- Jarosław Przybylak, "Grotesque in Metal", Goniec Pomorski, 5–6 February 1990, Szczecin.
