= Dąbrowa Duża, Masovian Voivodeship =

Village in Gmina Chynów, Poland

Dąbrowa Duża
- Village
- Location within Poland
- Coordinates: 51°53′56″N 21°07′50″E
- Country: Poland
- Voivodeship: Masovian
- County: Grójec
- Gmina: Chynów

Dąbrowa Duża [dɔmˈbrɔva ˈduʐa] is a village in the administrative district of Gmina Chynów, within Grójec County, Masovian Voivodeship, in east-central Poland.
