= Drwalewice, Masovian Voivodeship =

Drwalewice
- Village
- Location within Poland
- Coordinates: 51°53′15″N 21°1′18″E
- Country: Poland
- Voivodeship: Masovian
- County: Grójec
- Gmina: Chynów
- Time zone: UTC+1 (CET)
  - Summer (DST): UTC+2 (CEST)

Drwalewice [drvalɛˈvit͡sɛ] is a village in the administrative district of Gmina Chynów, within Grójec County, Masovian Voivodeship, in east-central Poland.

== History ==
Two Polish citizens were murdered by Nazi Germany in the village during World War II.

From 1975 to 1998, the village belonged administratively to the Radom Voivodeship.
