= Rososz, Grójec County =

Rososz
- Village
- Location within Poland
- Coordinates: 51°54′29″N 21°11′14″E
- Country: Poland
- Voivodeship: Masovian
- County: Grójec
- Gmina: Chynów
- Population: 100

Rososz [ˈrɔsɔʂ] is a village in the administrative district of Gmina Chynów, within Grójec County, Masovian Voivodeship, in east-central Poland.
