= Wola Żyrowska =

- Village
- Location within Poland
- Coordinates: 51°53′55″N 20°58′28″E
- Country: Poland
- Voivodeship: Masovian
- County: Grójec
- Gmina: Chynów

Wola Żyrowska [ˈvɔla ʐɨˈrɔfska] is a village in the administrative district of Gmina Chynów, within Grójec County, Masovian Voivodeship, in east-central Poland.
