= Gaj Żelechowski =

- Village
- Location within Poland
- Coordinates: 51°53′30″N 21°07′59″E
- Country: Poland
- Voivodeship: Masovian
- County: Grójec
- Gmina: Chynów

Gaj Żelechowski (Polish pronunciation: [ˈɡaj ʐɛlɛˈxɔfskʲi]) is a village in the administrative district of Gmina Chynów, within Grójec County, Masovian Voivodeship, in east-central Poland.
