= Barcice Drwalewskie =

- Village
- Location within Poland
- Coordinates: 51°54′N 20°59′E
- Country: Poland
- Voivodeship: Masovian
- County: Grójec
- Gmina: Chynów

Barcice Drwalewskie (Polish pronunciation: [barˈt͡ɕit͡sɛ drvaˈlɛfskʲɛ]) is a village in the administrative district of Gmina Chynów, within Grójec County, Masovian Voivodeship, in east-central Poland.
