= Przyłom =

- Village
- Location within Poland
- Coordinates: 51°51′N 21°2′E
- Country: Poland
- Voivodeship: Masovian
- County: Grójec
- Gmina: Chynów

Przyłom [ˈpʂɨwɔm] is a village in the administrative district of Gmina Chynów, within Grójec County, Masovian Voivodeship, in east-central Poland.
