= Citizen Włapko =

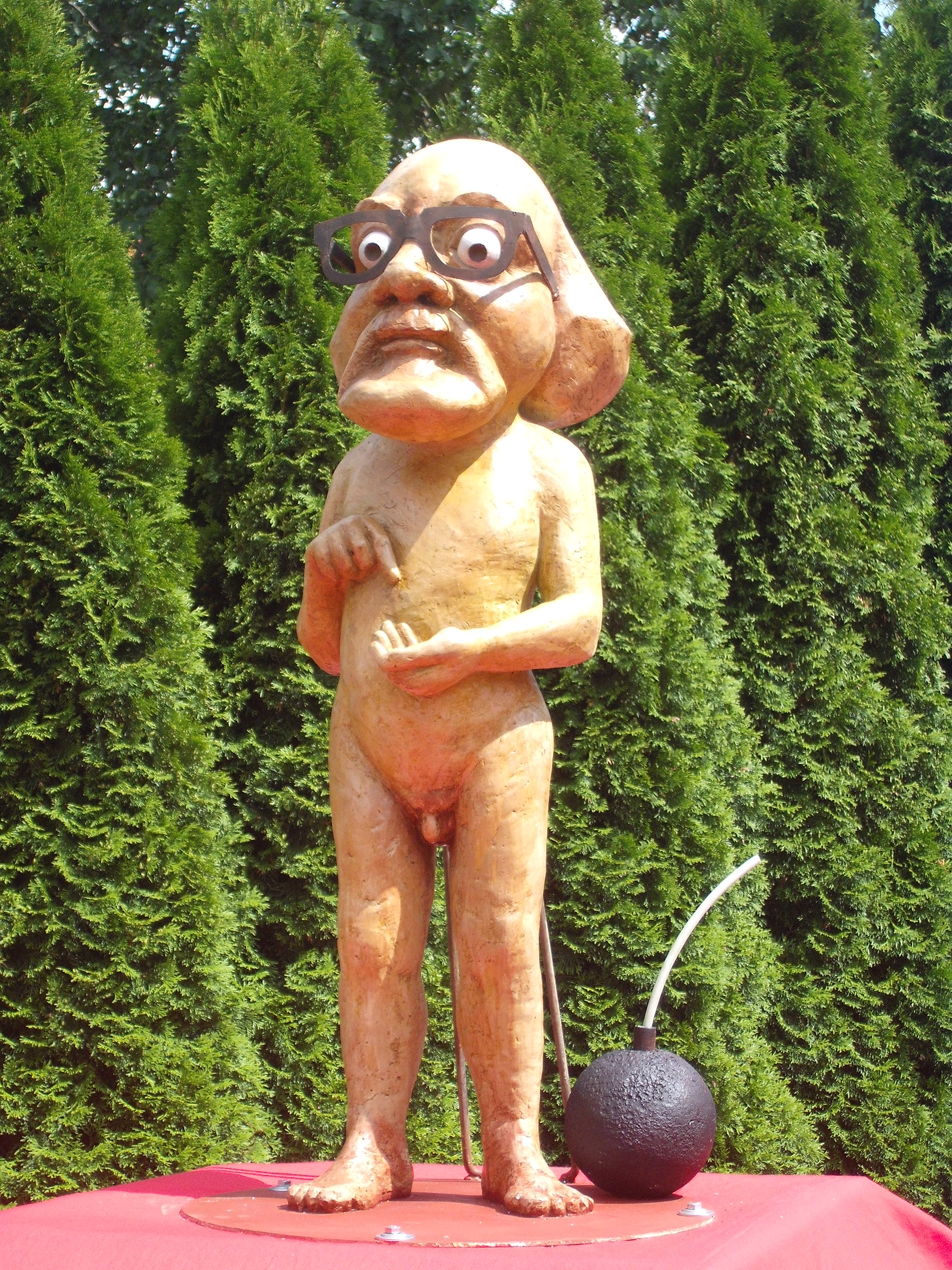
Citizen Skimmer (Polish: Obywatel Włapko) - the symbol of corrupt official

Citizen Włapko (Citizen Skimmer, Polish: Obywatel Włapko) is the name of a 1.10 meter-high sculpture symbolizing a corrupt official. The satirical figure shows a naked boy with the head of a mature man wearing glasses with a mustache and beard. His right forefinger pointing to his left palm indicates a request for money. There is a bomb next to his left foot, which symbolizes the explosive nature of the request, and the nudity symbolizes the whole, "naked" truth.

The creator of the sculpture is Wiesław Adamski from Szczecinek, Poland. The satirical figure was presented for the first time during the Happening on June 25, 2015 in Szczecinek, and then it visited many cities in Poland and across Europe..

One of the city's officials personally rendered justice to the author of the sculpture assaulting the artist in front of his apartment.

The Social Monument Building Committee of Citizen Włapko was created in Szczecinek, with the goal of constructing the monument in the city.

During the session of the City Council in Szczecinek, the poster with the image of Citizen Włapko caused confusion, when the councillor, Jacek Pawłowicz, with the support of the councillor Andrzej Grobelny, tried to give the poster for the mayor. The poster was not accepted by the mayor, and he took two councillors to court.

In 2020, a proposal to relocate the Citizen Włapko monument to Plac Wolności in front of Szczecinek Town Hall was submitted as part of the city's participatory budget. The proposal was rejected and led to a dispute between the applicants and the municipal authorities.

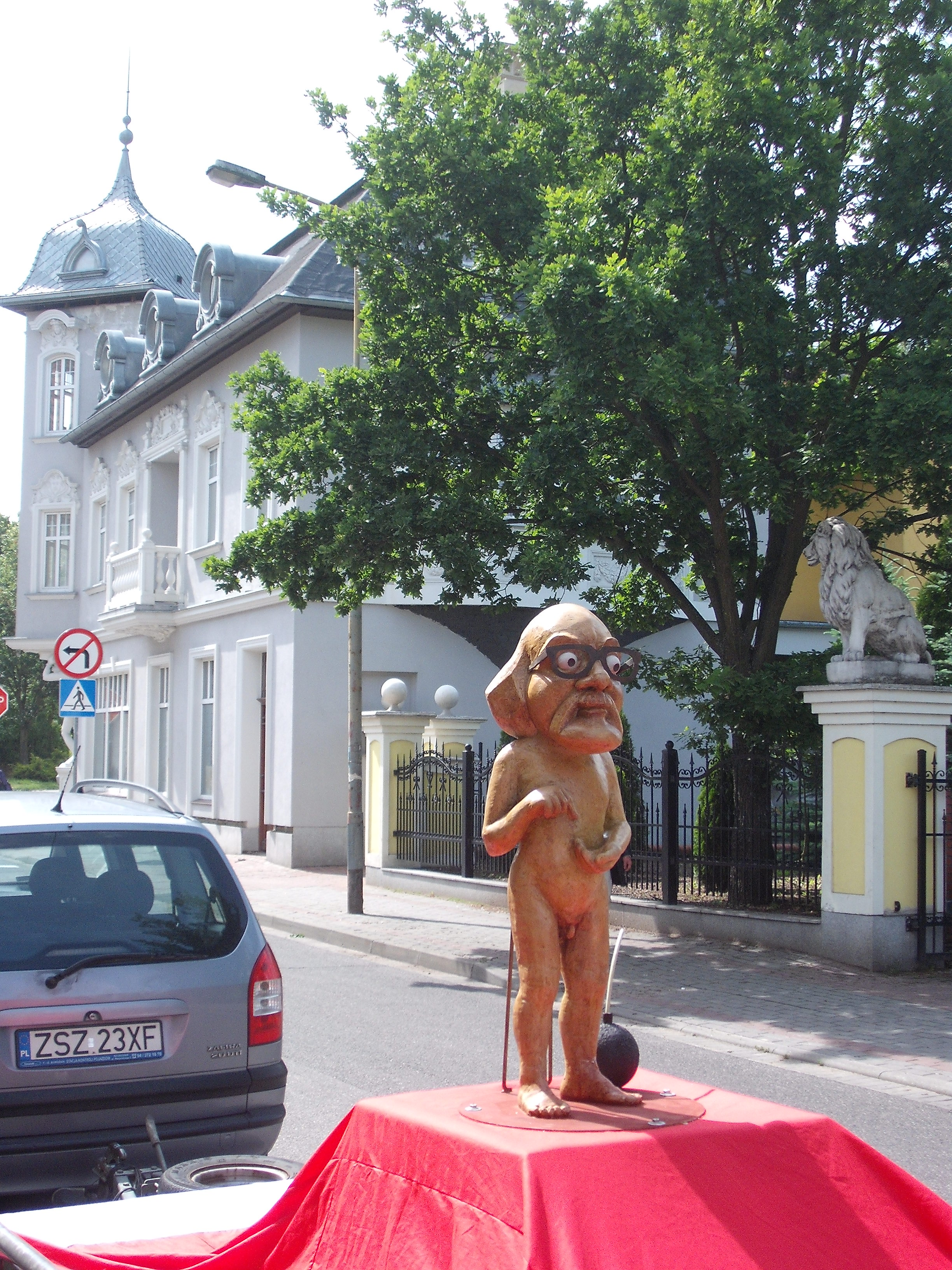
Citizen Włapko — happening in Szczecinek, Poland.

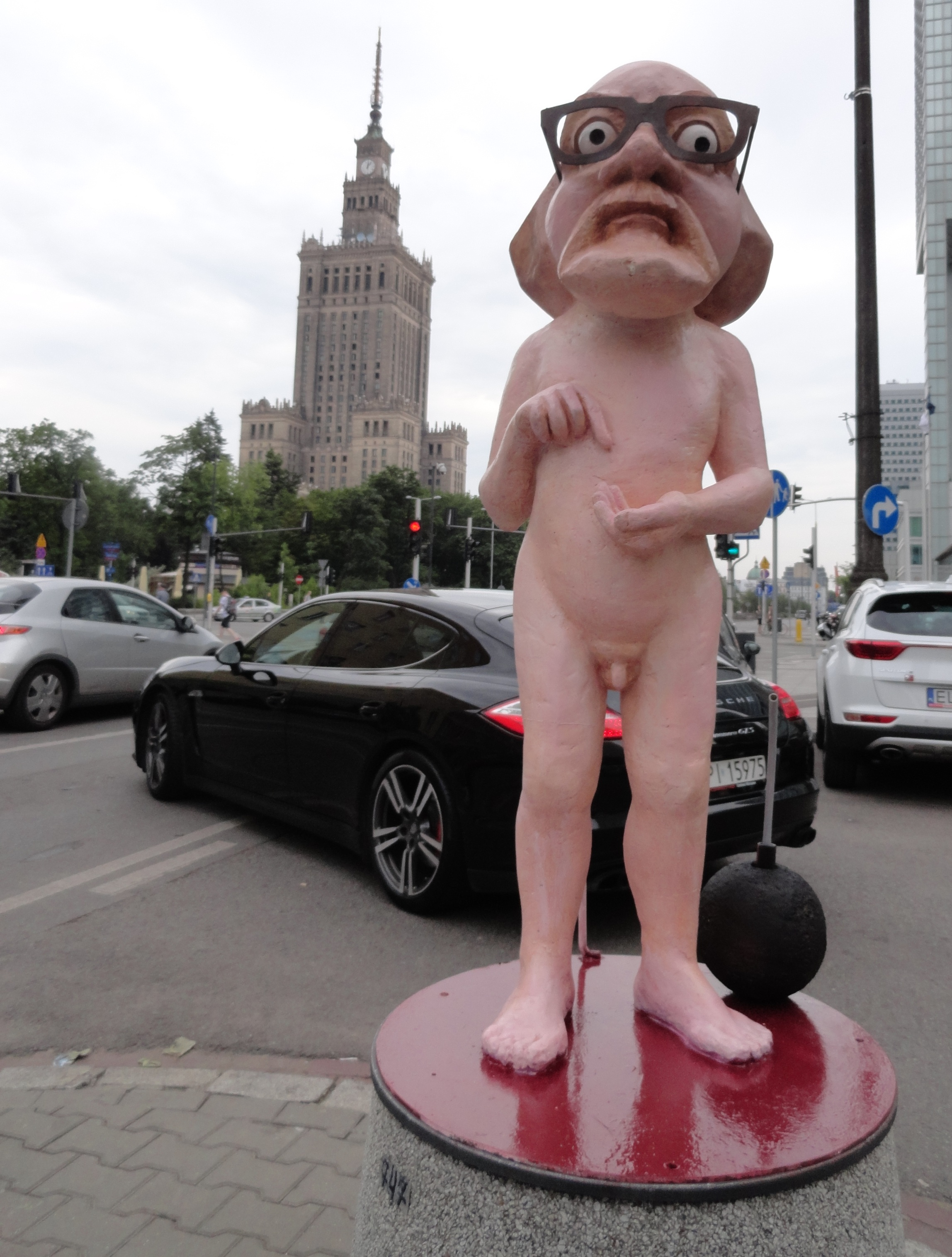
Włapko in Warsaw.

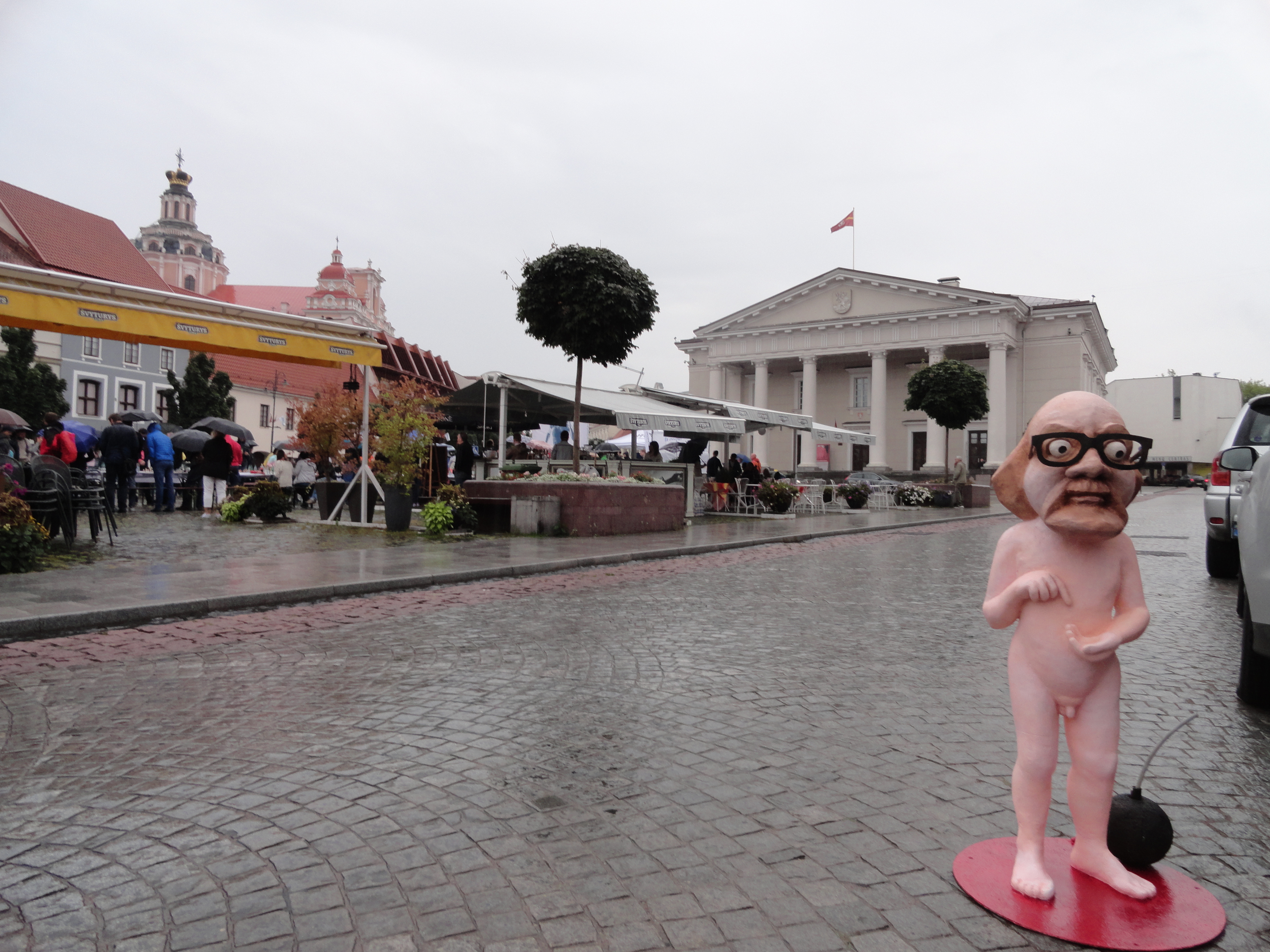
Włapko in Vilnius.

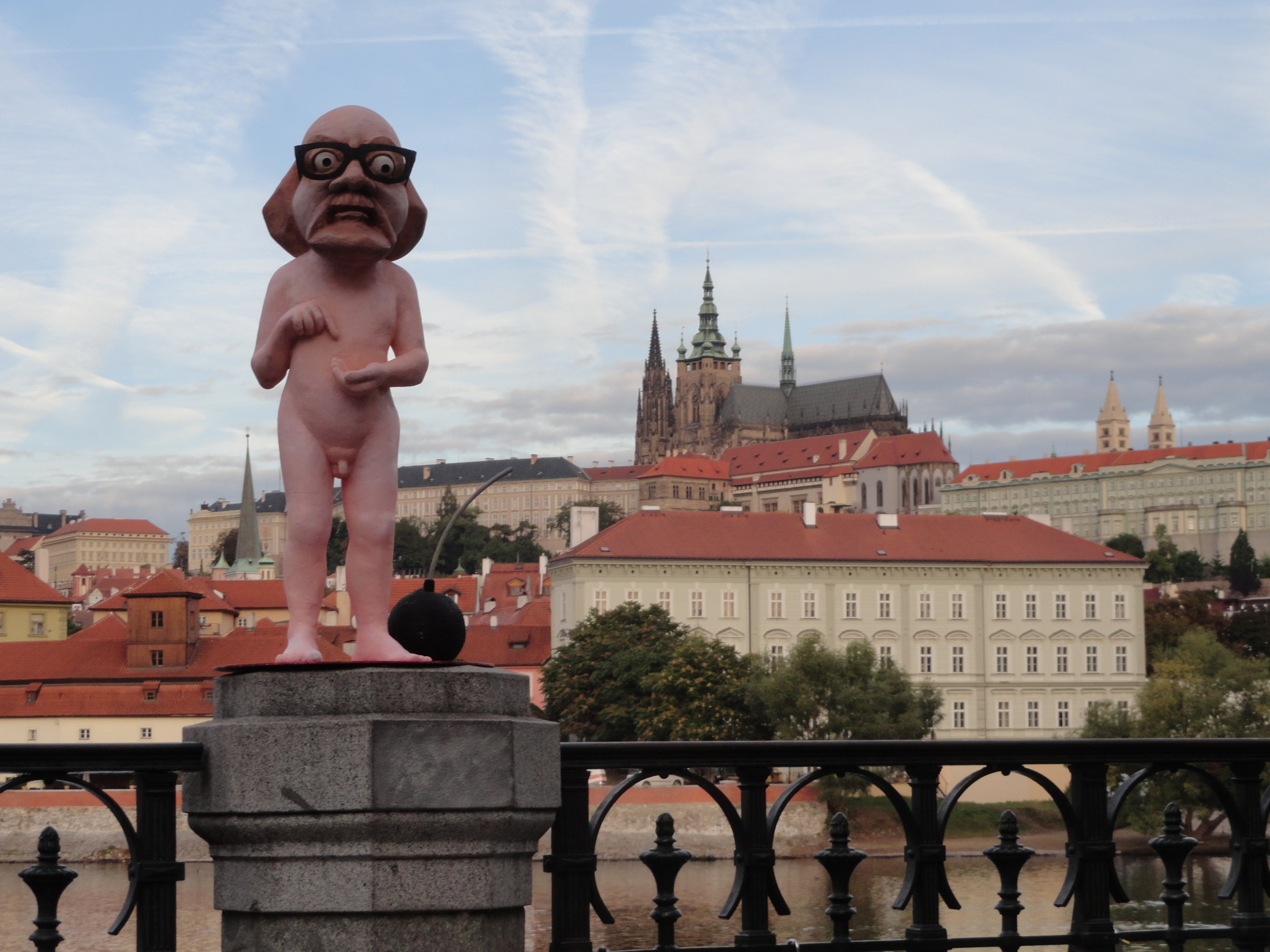
Włapko in Prague.

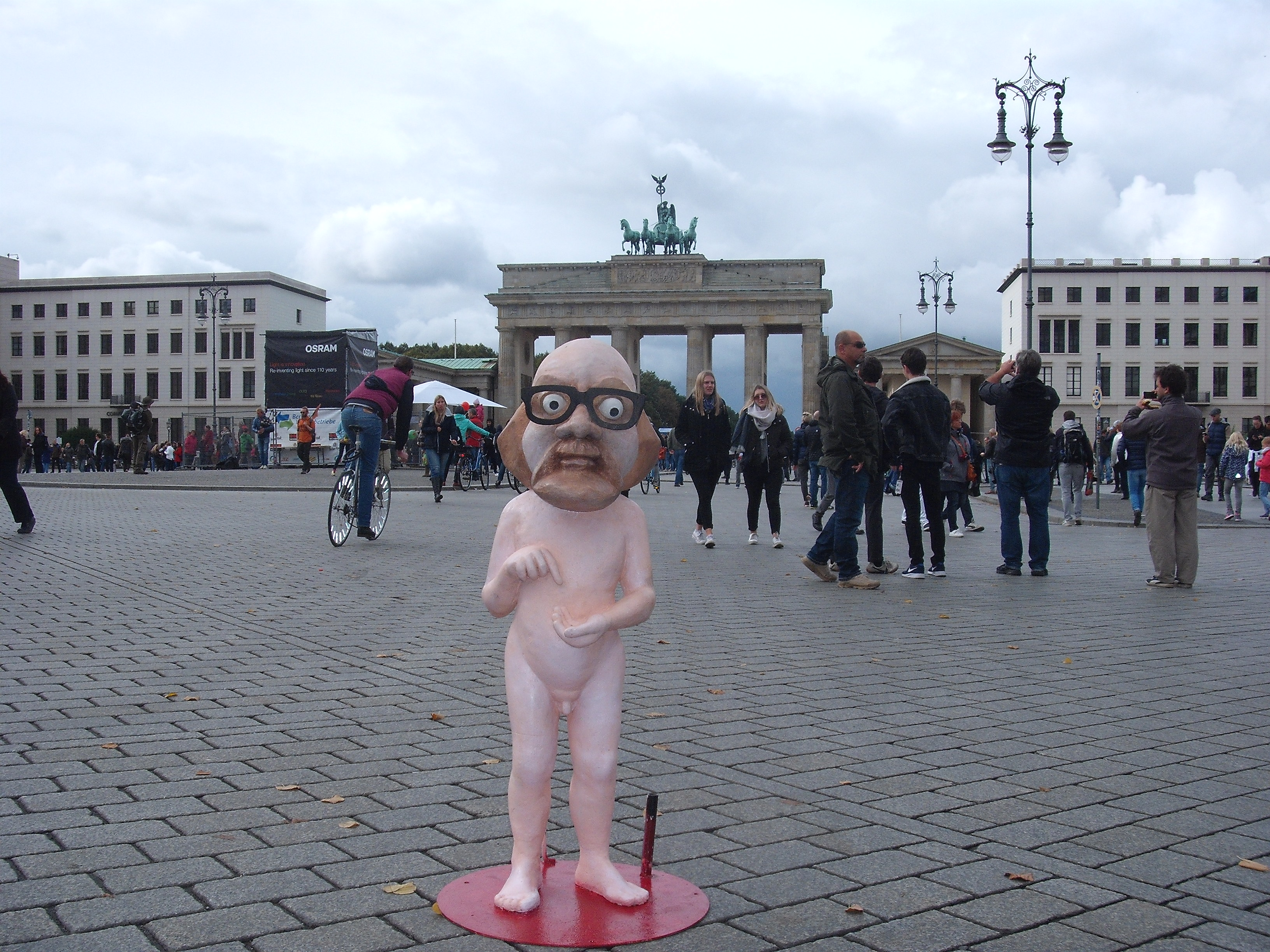
Włapko in Berlin.
