= Staniszewice =

- Village
- Location within Poland
- Coordinates: 51°54′29″N 21°9′13″E
- Country: Poland
- Voivodeship: Masovian
- County: Grójec
- Gmina: Chynów
- Population: 100

Staniszewice [staniʂɛˈvit͡sɛ] is a village in the administrative district of Gmina Chynów, within Grójec County, Masovian Voivodeship, in east-central Poland.
