= Mąkosin =

Village in Gmina Chynów, Poland

- Village
- Location within Poland
- Coordinates: 51°51′01″N 21°04′40″E
- Country: Poland
- Voivodeship: Masovian
- County: Grójec
- Gmina: Chynów

Mąkosin [mɔŋˈkɔɕin] is a village in the administrative district of Gmina Chynów, within Grójec County, Masovian Voivodeship, in east-central Poland.
