= Dobiecin, Gmina Chynów =

Dobiecin
- Village
- Location within Poland
- Coordinates: 51°54′33″N 21°09′49″E
- Country: Poland
- Voivodeship: Masovian
- County: Grójec
- Gmina: Chynów

Dobiecin [dɔˈbjɛt͡ɕin] is a village in the administrative district of Gmina Chynów, within Grójec County, Masovian Voivodeship, in east-central Poland.
