= Pawłówka =

Pawłówka may refer to the following places:

- Pawłówka, Lublin Voivodeship (east Poland)
- Pawłówka, Masovian Voivodeship (east-central Poland)
- Pawłówka, Podlaskie Voivodeship (north-east Poland)
