= Martynów =

Village in Gmina Chynów, Poland

- Village
- Location within Poland
- Coordinates: 51°50′42″N 21°08′14″E
- Country: Poland
- Voivodeship: Masovian
- County: Grójec
- Gmina: Chynów

Martynów [marˈtɨnuf] is a village in the administrative district of Gmina Chynów, within Grójec County, Masovian Voivodeship, in east-central Poland.
