= Wola Chynowska =

- Village
- Location within Poland
- Coordinates: 51°53′59″N 21°4′49″E
- Country: Poland
- Voivodeship: Masovian
- County: Grójec
- Gmina: Chynów
- Population: 600

Wola Chynowska [ˈvɔla xɨˈnɔfska] is a village in the administrative district of Gmina Chynów, within Grójec County, Masovian Voivodeship, in east-central Poland.

== People born in Wola Chynowska ==
- Wincenty Szweycer
