= Franciszków, Gmina Chynów =

Franciszków
- Village
- Location within Poland
- Coordinates: 51°51′42″N 21°2′6″E
- Country: Poland
- Voivodeship: Masovian
- County: Grójec
- Gmina: Chynów

Franciszków (Polish pronunciation: [fraɲˈt͡ɕiʂkuf]) is a village in the administrative district of Gmina Chynów, within Grójec County, Masovian Voivodeship, in east-central Poland.
