= Janów, Grójec County =

Janów
- Village
- Location within Poland
- Coordinates: 51°51′29″N 21°6′43″E
- Country: Poland
- Voivodeship: Masovian
- County: Grójec
- Gmina: Chynów
- Elevation: 130 m (430 ft)
- Population: 230

Janów [ˈjanuf] is a village in the administrative district of Gmina Chynów, within Grójec County, Masovian Voivodeship, in east-central Poland.
