= Gmina Chynów =

Gmina Chynów Chynów Commune
- Gmina
- Flag Coat of arms
- Interactive map of Gmina Chynów
- Coordinates (Chynów): 51°54′23″N 21°5′5″E
- Country: Poland
- Voivodeship: Masovian
- County: Grójec
- Seat: Chynów

Area
  - Total: 137.07 km^{2} (52.92 sq mi)

Population (2006)
  - Total: 9,442
  - Density: 68.88/km^{2} (178.4/sq mi)
- Website: https://www.chynow.pl/

Gmina Chynów is a rural gmina (administrative district) in Grójec County, Masovian Voivodeship, in east-central Poland. Its seat is the village of Chynów, which lies approximately 16 kilometres (10 mi) east of Grójec and 35 km (22 mi) south of Warsaw.

The gmina covers an area of 137.07 square kilometres (52.9 sq mi), and as of 2006 its total population is 9,442.

== Villages ==
Gmina Chynów contains the villages and settlements of Adamów Rososki, Barcice Drwalewskie, Barcice Rososkie, Budy Sułkowskie, Budziszyn, Budziszynek, Chynów, Dąbrowa Duża, Dobiecin, Drwalew, Drwalewice, Edwardów, Franciszków, Gaj Żelechowski, Gliczyn, Grobice, Henryków, Jakubowizna, Janów, Jurandów, Krężel, Kukały, Lasopole, Ludwików, Machcin, Mąkosin, Marianów, Martynów, Marynin, Milanów, Nowe Grobice, Pawłówka, Pieczyska, Piekut, Przyłom, Rososz, Rososzka, Staniszewice, Sułkowice, Watraszew, Węszelówka, Widok, Wola Chynowska, Wola Kukalska, Wola Pieczyska, Wola Żyrowska, Wygodne, Zalesie, Zawady, Żelazna, Żelechów and Żyrów.

== Neighbouring gminas ==
Gmina Chynów is bordered by the gminas of Góra Kalwaria, Grójec, Jasieniec, Prażmów and Warka.

== Rural Poverty ==
According to a 2008 'Der Spiegel' article, the children who attend the elementary school in Chynów are suffering the consequences of rising food prices, to the point that a school meal is the best meal a child may receive, and has come to represent a major incentive for a child to attend school.

This state of affairs is difficult to reconcile with the facts that Poland is a contributor to many international and EU-wide food-aid programmes, and Chynów is situated in an area well endowed with agricultural land.

As to why such a problem has arisen with regard to food supply, above and beyond the current rise in prices, it would seem likely that lack of food production is due to EU agricultural policies and /or mal-administration at the state and/or county levels.
