= Zalesie, Gmina Chynów =

Zalesie
- Village
- Location within Poland
- Coordinates: 51°53′8″N 21°9′14″E
- Country: Poland
- Voivodeship: Masovian
- County: Grójec
- Gmina: Chynów
- Postal code: 05-650

Zalesie [zaˈlɛɕɛ] is a village in the administrative district of Gmina Chynów, within Grójec County, Masovian Voivodeship, in east-central Poland.
