= Henryków, Grójec County =

Henryków
- Village
- Location within Poland
- Coordinates: 51°55′53″N 21°05′36″E
- Country: Poland
- Voivodeship: Masovian
- County: Grójec
- Gmina: Chynów

Henryków [xɛnˈrɨkuf] is a village in the administrative district of Gmina Chynów, within Grójec County, Masovian Voivodeship, in east-central Poland.
