= Wincenty Szweycer =

Wincenty Konreli Feliks Szweycer (born 6 April 1810 in Wola Chynowska, d. 6 June 1872 in Chociwie) was a Polish noble (ziemianin), an owner of Rzeczyca, participant of November Uprising and January Uprising.

== Biography ==
Wincenty was born on 16 April 1810 in Wola Chynowska. He was son of Ludwik (1776-1835), an heir of Wola Drzazgowa, and Marianna de domo Piwor (1782-1842).

He died suddenly on 6 June 1872 in Chociwie, where he visited his friend Jan Nepomucen Jaśkowski. Wincenty Szweycer was buried in Rzeczyca.

Jaśkowski dedicated him a poem Na śmierć Wincentego Szwejcera w Rzeczycy.

== Bibliography ==
- Witczak, Krzysztof Tomasz (2014). "Szweycer, Wincenty". Polski Słownik Biograficzny. Vol. 49. Polska Akademia Nauk & Polska Akademia Umiejętności. p. 489.
