= Zelazna sheep =

Breed of sheep

Zelazna is a breed of sheep and is also known by Zeleznienska. The Zelazna was developed at Warsaw Agricultural University. They belong to the Polish Lowland group and are found throughout Poland. They were developed from Polish Merino crossed with Leicester Longwool and Lowicz.
