= Marynin, Lublin County =

Marynin
- Village
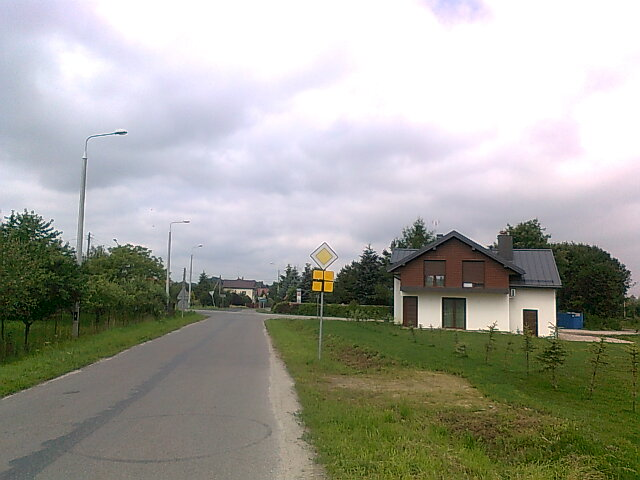

- Location within Poland
- Coordinates: 51°13′N 22°26′E
- Country: Poland
- Voivodeship: Lublin
- County: Lublin
- Gmina: Konopnica
- Time zone: UTC+1 (CET)
  - Summer (DST): UTC+2 (CEST)

Marynin [maˈrɨnin] is a village in the administrative district of Gmina Konopnica, within Lublin County, Lublin Voivodeship, in eastern Poland.

== History ==
Seven Polish citizens were murdered by Nazi Germany in the village during World War II.
