= Pieczyska, Grójec County =

Pieczyska
- Village
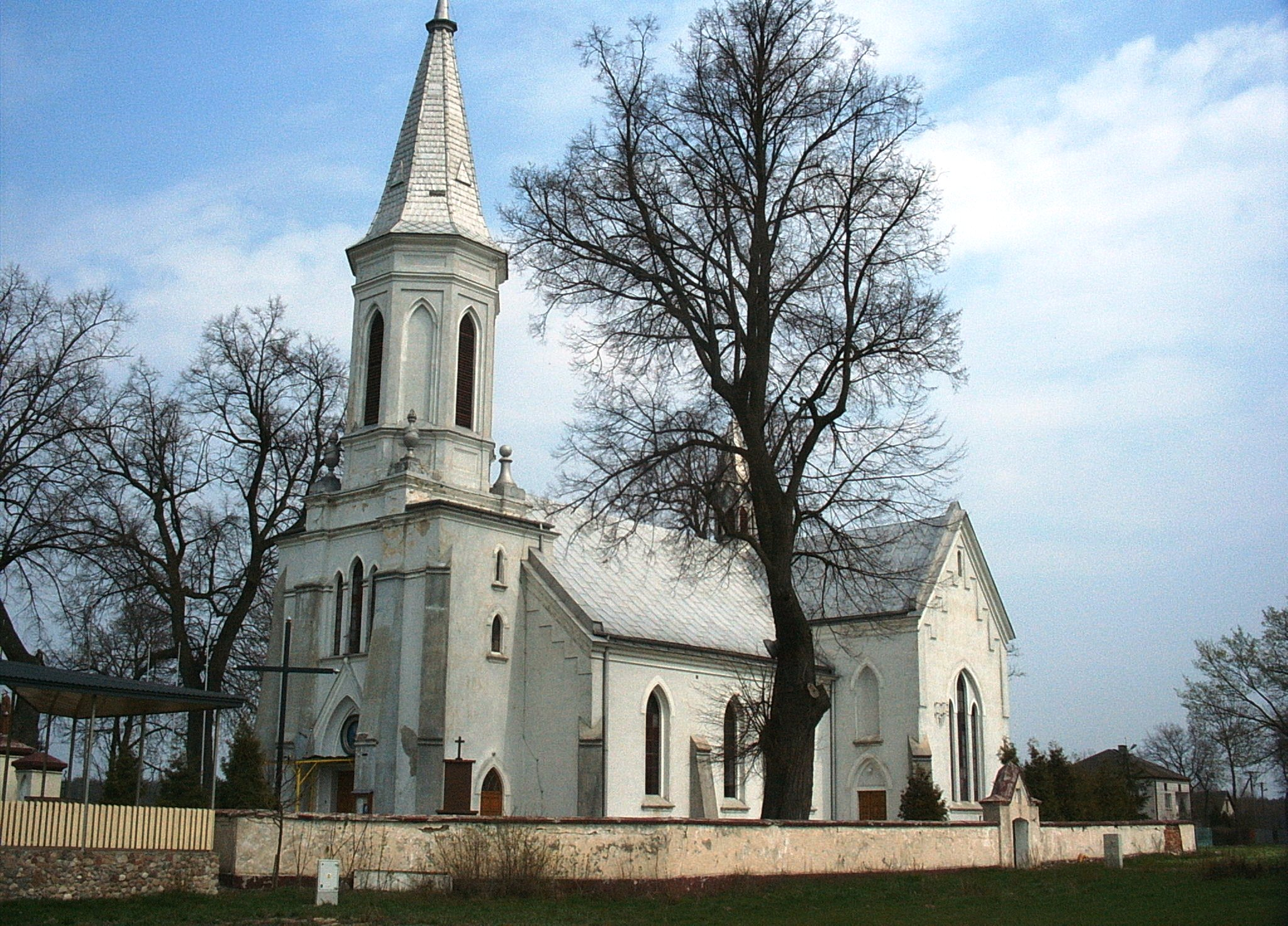
- Church (before renovation)

- Location within Poland
- Coordinates: 51°55′18″N 21°1′13″E
- Country: Poland
- Voivodeship: Masovian
- County: Grójec
- Gmina: Chynów

Pieczyska [pjɛˈt͡ʂɨska] is a village in the administrative district of Gmina Chynów, within Grójec County, Masovian Voivodeship, in east-central Poland.
