= Widok, Masovian Voivodeship =

Widok
- Village
- Location within Poland
- Coordinates: 51°53′47″N 21°6′30″E
- Country: Poland
- Voivodeship: Masovian
- County: Grójec
- Gmina: Chynów

Widok [ˈvidɔk] is a village in the administrative district of Gmina Chynów, within Grójec County, Masovian Voivodeship, in east-central Poland.
