= Żelazna, Grójec County =

Żelazna
- Village
- Location within Poland
- Coordinates: 51°52′41″N 21°9′33″E
- Country: Poland
- Voivodeship: Masovian
- County: Grójec
- Gmina: Chynów
- Population: 80

Żelazna [ʐɛˈlazna] is a village in the administrative district of Gmina Chynów, within Grójec County, Masovian Voivodeship, in east-central Poland.
