= Budziszyn, Masovian Voivodeship =

Budziszyn
- Village
- Location within Poland
- Coordinates: 51°52′36″N 21°3′23″E
- Country: Poland
- Voivodeship: Masovian
- County: Grójec
- Gmina: Chynów
- Elevation: 130 m (430 ft)
- Population: 100

Budziszyn [buˈd͡ʑiʂɨn] is a village in the administrative district of Gmina Chynów, within Grójec County, Masovian Voivodeship, in east-central Poland.
