= Raków, Warsaw =

Neighbourhood of Warsaw, Poland

Raków
- City Information System area (neighbourhood)
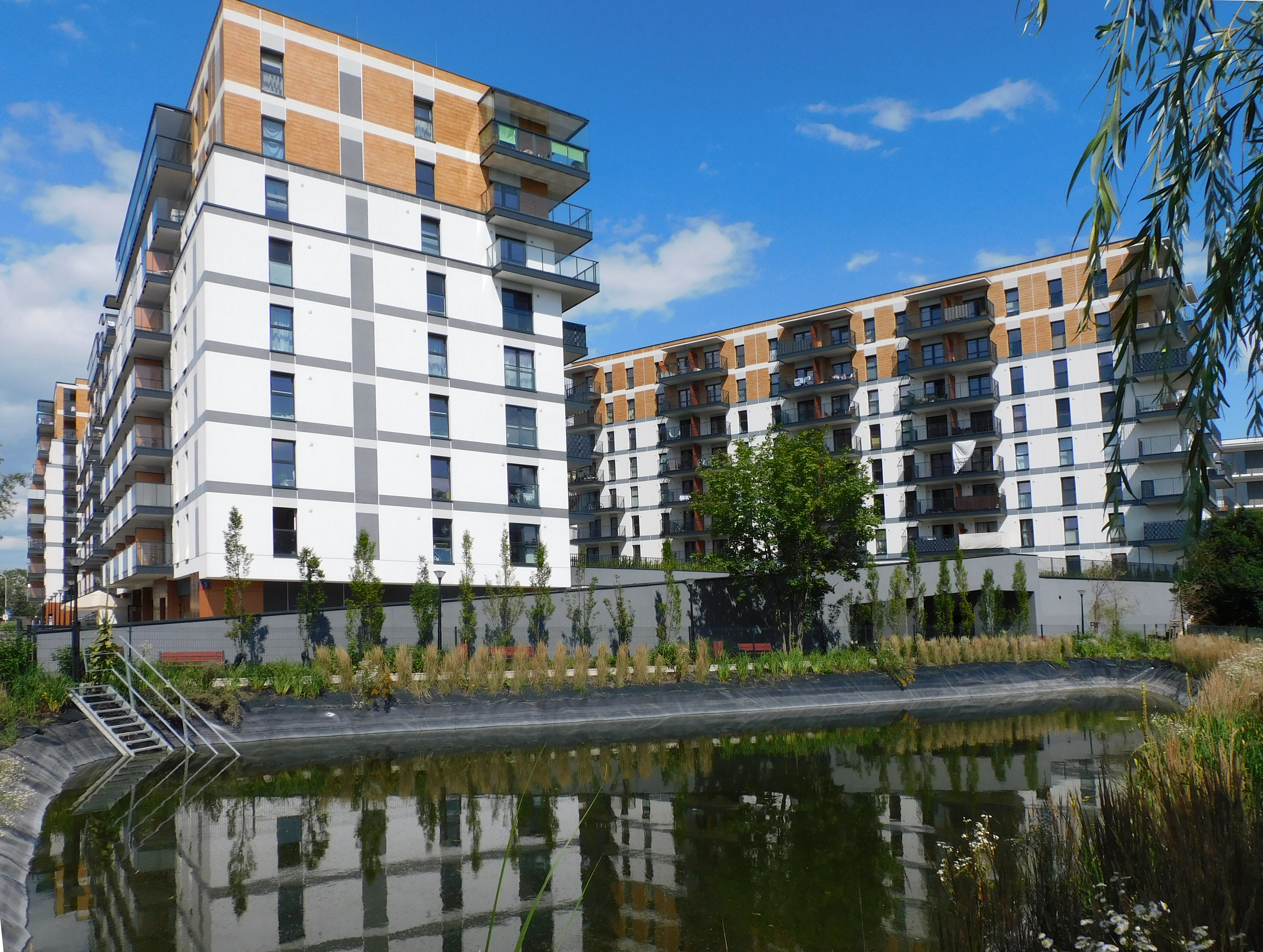
- The apartment buildings at Rakowska Street, in front of the Faience Clay Pits.

- Raków within the Włochy district.
- Coordinates: 52°11′50.35″N 20°57′00.56″E
- Country: Poland
- Voivodeship: Masovian
- City county: Warsaw
- District: Włochy
- Time zone: UTC+1 (CET)
  - Summer (DST): UTC+2 (CEST)
- Area code: +48 22

Raków (Polish: [ˈrak.uf]) is a neighbourhood, and a City Information System area, in Warsaw, Poland, within the Włochy district. It is a residential area, featuring apartment buildings, and to a lesser extend, single-family detached houses. It also includes the Centrum Łopuszańska 22 shopping mall. Raków was founded in the 13th century, and by the 1920s, it became part of the village of Okęcie. Throughout the 1920s and 1930s, the manufacturing industry developed in the area. It was incorporated into the city in 1951. Throughout 2010s and 2020s, Raków transformed into a residential neighbourhood with apartment buildings.

== History ==
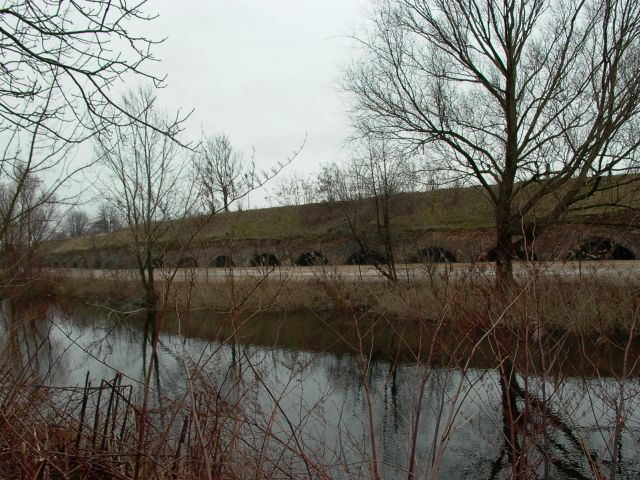
The historic barracks of Fort VI "Okęcie", built near Raków in the 1880s.

The oldest known records of Raków date to 1231, when it was given to knight Gotard of Służew, by Duke Konrad I of Masovia, the ruler of the Duchy of Masovia. At the time, it was a small village, known as Rakowo. At the turn of the 14th century, the hamlet of Rakowiec separated from the village, and was later also followed by Okęcie. In 1447, the village was granted the Kulm law rights by Duke Bolesław IV of Warsaw. In 1528, the village, together with its farmlands, were measured at 6 lans, which corresponded to around 108 ha. It was owned by the Rakowiecki family, which descended from Gotard of Służew, and belonged to the Radwan clan. In the 17th century, the village was acquired by magnate and politician Stanisław Warszycki. Later, the village was also owned by Lubomirski and Plater families, among others.

In 1789, Raków had 27 households, and the area suffered during the Kościuszko Uprising in 1795. In 1827, the village had 185 residents, making it the second largest settlement in the area, after Solipse. At the beginning of the 19th century, the hamlet of Zosin was founded between Raków and Szczęśliwice, for the employees of the local brickworks industry. Following the abolition of serfdom in 1864, the area was incorporated into the municipality of Skorosze. Between 1883 and 1888, Forts V "Włochy", VI "Okęcie", and VI "Zbarż" were constructed by the Imperial Russian Army near Raków, as part of the city fortifications, known as the Warsaw Fortress. As such, the government heavily restricted construction in their vicinity, hindering the development of the nearby villages. Around that time, Kraków Road (now forming Krakowska Avenue) was built next to the village, connecting Warsaw and Kraków. At the beginning of the 20th century, Raków had 21 households. The village was eventually surpassed in size by the rapidly developing Okęcie, and was subsequently incorporated into it in the late 1920s. The military fortifications were retired and partially demolished in 1913. Following this, a new extension of the village, known as Raków-Kolonia, was founded to the west of Fort VI "Okęcie".

Throughout the 1920s and 1930s, numerous factories began developing in Okęcie and Raków. In 1923, tram tracks were constructed alongside Kraków Road, crossing Raków, as part of a line connecting Okęcie with Warsaw. In 1927, the tracks of the Electric Commuter Railway were built between Raków and Wiktoryn, as part of the line between Warsaw and Grodzisk Mazowiecki. It included stations Warszawa Raków, originally known as Włochy EKD, placed on Łopuszańska Street, and Skrzyżowanie, at the current intersection of Szybka and Równoległa Streets. The latter was closed down in 1974. In 1934, the Warszawa Aleje Jerozolimskie railway station was opened near Jerusalem Avenue. It formed a connection to Okęcie, predominantly used by cargo trains. It passed through Raków, with stations Polmin at the intersection of Łopuszańska and Orzechowa Streets, and Lotnisko, at the intersection of Krakowska Avenue and Komitetu Obrony Robotników Street. The line was closed down in 1966.

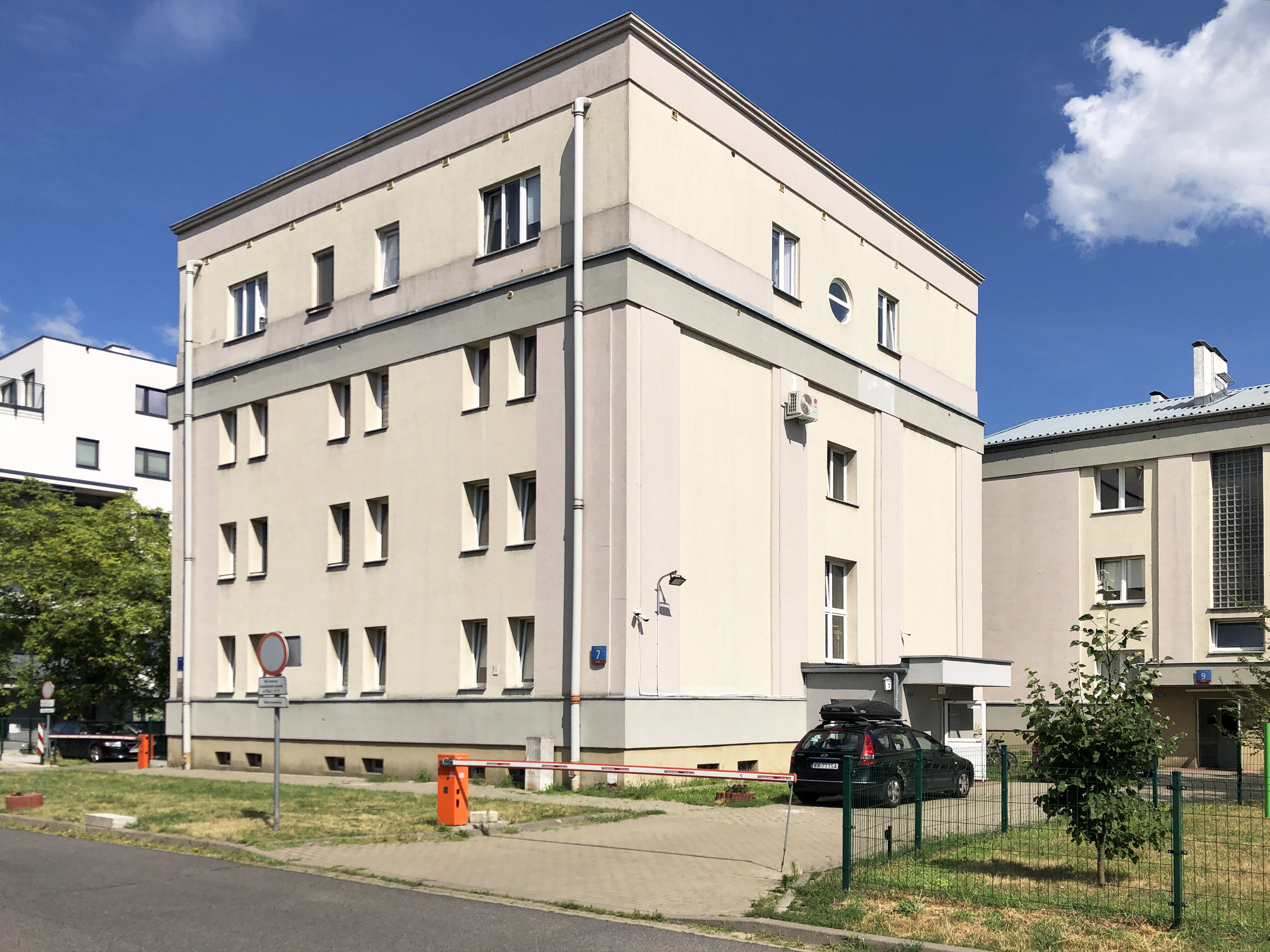
The housing estate of Okęcie II, built in 1953.

On 1 April 1939, the area including Okęcie and Raków formed a new municipality, known as Okęcie. On 15 May 1951, it was incorporated into the city of Warsaw. Between 1952 and 1953, the housing estate of Okęcie II, was developed with three apartment buildings at 7, 9, and 11 Flisa Street. In 1962, the Warszawa Rakowiec railway station was opened next to Grójecka Street, as part of the line between Warsaw West and Kraków Main.

In 2000, following an extensive renovation, expansion, and modernisation process, an abandoned office building at 257 Krakowska Avenue was adopted to house the town hall of the Włochy district. On 19 May 2004, the district was subdivided into the City Information System areas, with Raków becoming one of them. Aside from historical Raków, it also included Raków-Kolonia. Additionally, a large portion of the historical neighbourhood became part of the area of Okęcie instead. When created, the area was named Szczęśliwice, the same as the nearby neighbourhood in Ochota, and was renamed to Raków on 19 May 2004.

Throughout 2010s and 2020s, several more housing estates of apartment buildings development in Raków, on place of warehouses and factories. In 2015, the Centrum Łopuszańska 22 shopping mall was opened at 22 Łopuszańska Street.

== Characteristics ==
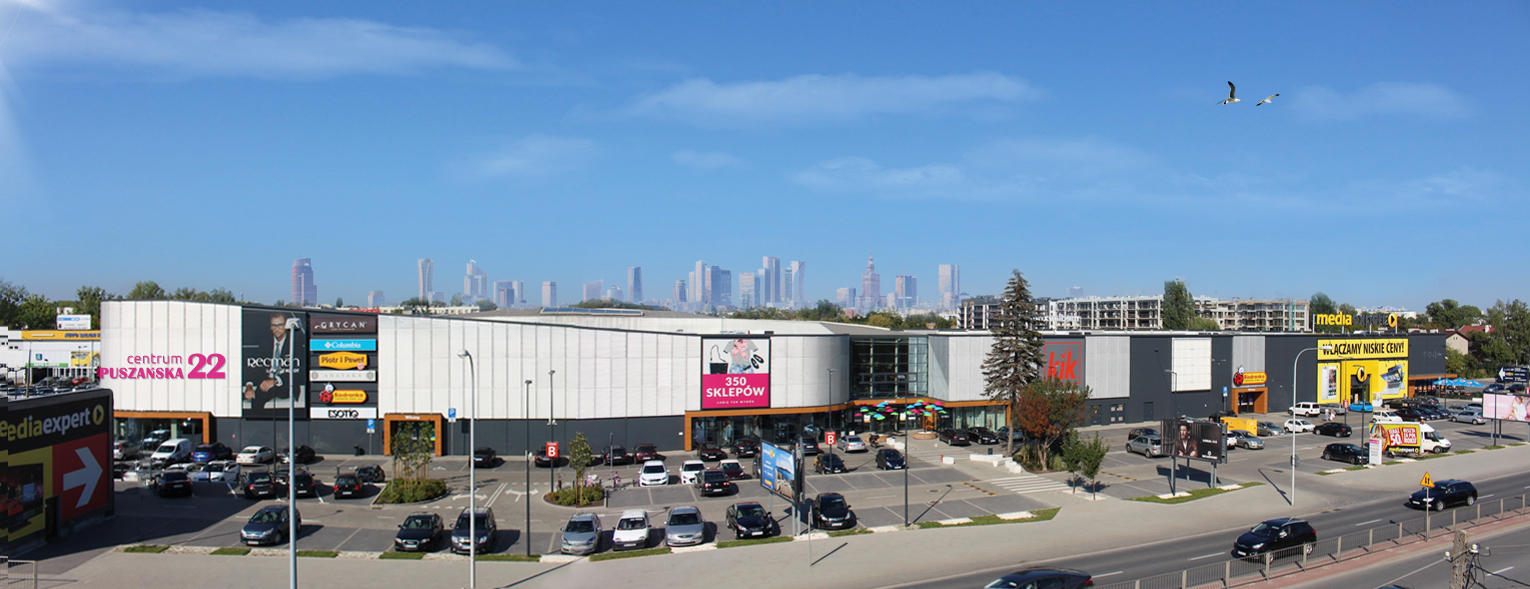
The Centrum Łopuszańska 22 shopping mall.

Raków is a residential area, featuring apartment buildings and, to a lesser extent, single-family detached houses. The neighbourhood of Okęcie II, consisting of three buildings at 7, 9, and 11 Flisa Street, is the oldest housing estate in the neighbourhood, dating to 1953. To a lesser extent, the area also includes warehouses and factories. Raków also features the Centrum Łopuszańska 22 shopping mall was opened at 22 Łopuszańska Street. Moreover, the neighbourhood houses the town hall of the Włochy district, located at 257 Krakowska Avenue. Additionally, three railway stations are located at the neighbourhood boundaries. They are: Warszawa Aleje Jerozolimskie next to Jerusalem Avenue, Warszawa Raków on Łopuszańska Street, and Warszawa Rakowiec next to Grójecka Street. Raków also includes the Faience Clay Pits, a collection of three small ponds, located near the intersection of Fajansowa and Rakowska Streets.

== Location and boundaries ==
Raków is a City Information System area in Warsaw, located in the central north portion of the Włochy district. Its boundaries are approximately determined to the north by the tracks of the railway line no. 8; to the east, by Krakowska Avenue, Łopuszańska Street, and Filsa Street; to the south, by Krakowiaków Street; and to the west, by Kąciego Wąsa Street Łopuszańska Street, tracks of the railway line no. 47, Pryzmaty Street, Popularna Street and around the building at 71 Popularna Street, Wiktoryn Street, and Jerusalem Avenue. The neighbourhood is subdivided into two parts, Raków in the north, and Szczęśliwice in the south, separated by Bakalarska Street, and in a straight line leading to Zagadki Street. The neighbourhood borders Szczęśliwice to the north, Rakowiec to the northeast, Okęcie to the southeast, and Salomea, and Stare Włochy to the west. Its nother boundary forms a border between Włochy and Ochota districts.

Raków is also a name for a small area, forming a subdivision within the nearby City Information System area of Okęcie. Its boundaries are determined by Krakowska Avenue, Komitetu Obrony Robotników Street, Szybka Street, Warsaw Chopin Airport, and the Institute of Aviation. It features warehouses and commercial service buildings.
