= Solipse =

Neighbourhood of Warsaw, Poland

- Neighbourhood
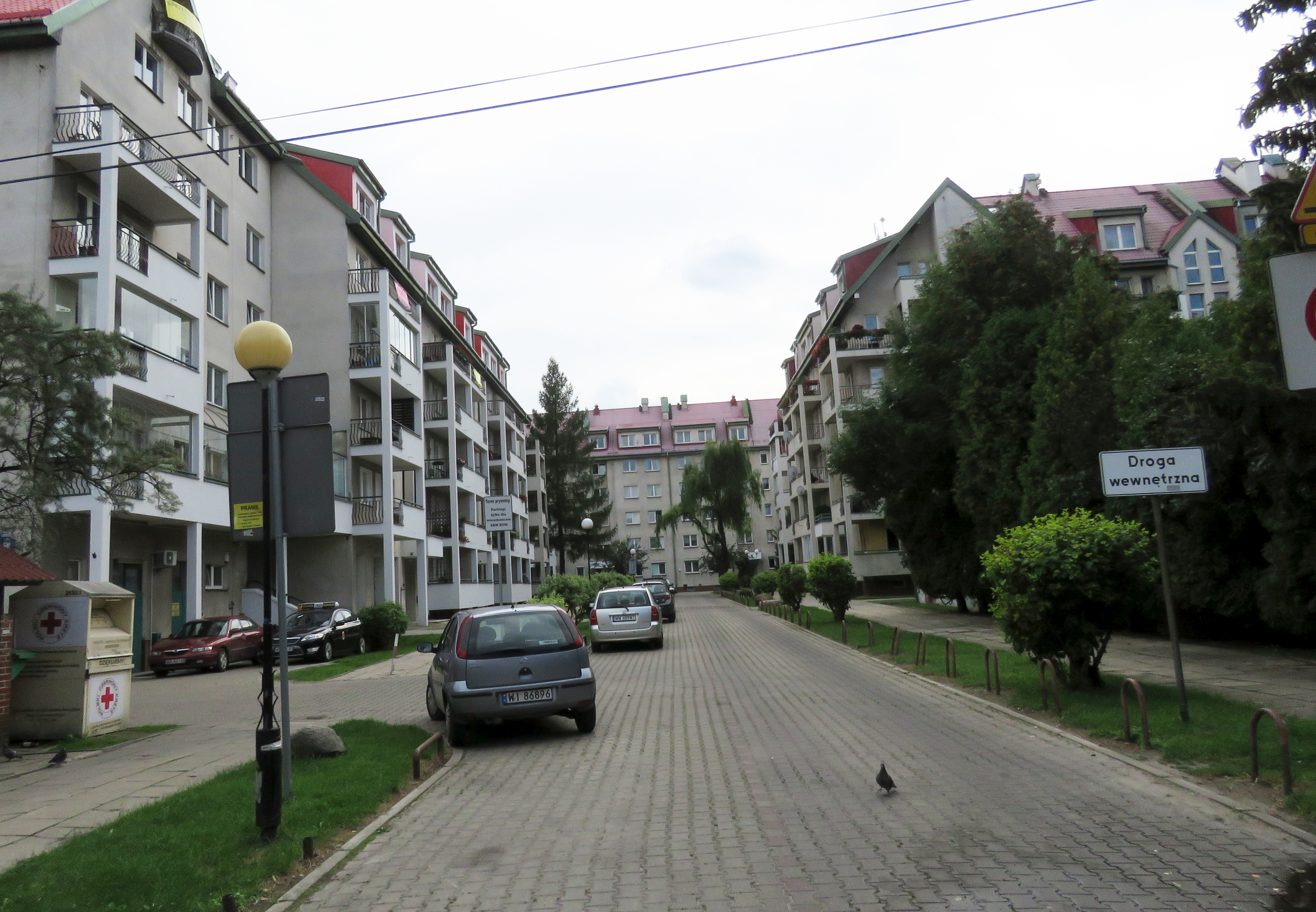
- Apartment buildings on Solipska Street.
- Interactive map of Solipse
- Coordinates: 52.201290°N 20.909266°E
- Country: Poland
- Voivodeship: Masovian
- City county: Warsaw
- District: Włochy
- City Information System area: Old Włochy
- Time zone: UTC+1 (CET)
  - Summer (DST): UTC+2 (CEST)
- Area code: +48 22

Solipse (Polish: [sɔˈlip.sɛ]) is a neighbourhood of Warsaw, Poland, in the Włochy district. It is located in the area of Solipska Street, within the southwestern portion of the City Informatation System area of Old Włochy. It is a residential area, consisting of single-family low-rise houses and mid-rise apartment buildings. The area also includes the Fort V "Włochy", retired fortifications from 1888, currently used as a public park, and two Roman Catholic parish cemeteries.

In 1395, the village of Sopęchy was first recorded in the area. It was founded by the Rakowski family of the clan of Radwan, descending from count Gotard of Służew. In the 15th century, the villages of Solipse, was separated from it, being recorded for the first time in 1435. In 1888, the Fort V "Włochy" was built to its southeast, as part of the city fortifications, known as the Warsaw Fortress. Following its retirement in 1913, the fort and its surroundings begun being used as a sauatter settlement by the impoverished and homeless population of Włochy and Solipse. In 1939, villages of Solipse, Włochy, and Wiktoryn were merged together, forming the town of Włochy. The area was captured by German Wehrmacht on 8 September 1939, during the first days of the Second World War, and was later sight of battle during the siege of Warsaw on 12 September, when a few companies from the 360th Infantry Regiment of the Polish Armed Forces, together with two tank companies, attacked German positions in Okęcie, briefly recapturing the airport, before being pushed back in the area of Załuski, after experiencing heavy casualties. While the area remained under the German occupation, the airport was used for cargo transportation, and as a base for the German Air Force. From November 1940 to February 1941, while the area was under the German occupation during the Second World War, a ghetto operated near Solipse, with around 300 Jewish residents, before being closed with its population relocated to the Warsaw Ghetto. In 1951, it was incorporated into the city of Warsaw.

== History ==
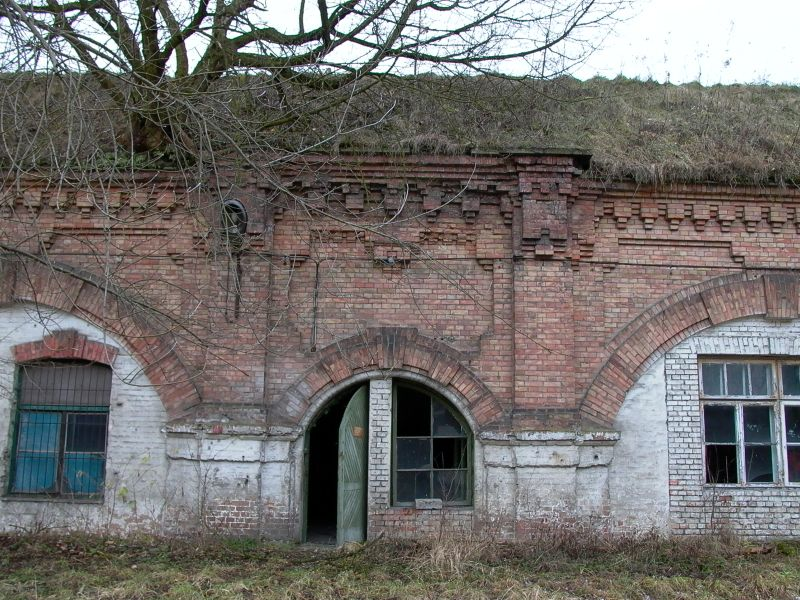
The retired barracks of Fort V "Włochy", built in 1888.

In 1395, the village of Sopęchy was first recorded in the area of the modern Budki Szczęśliwickie Street. It was founded by the Rakowski family of the clan of Radwan, descending from count Gotard of Służew. In the 15th century, the villages of Solipse (originally known as Solipsy) and Porzucewo (later renamed to Włochy in the 16th century), were separated from Sopęchy. In 1422, the area was owned by the knight Strachota. Solipse were first recorded in 1435, eventually becoming property of the Solipski family. In the first half of the 17th century, the landed estate of Włochy, including Solipse, was acquired by Andrzej Leszczyński, the Grand Chancellor of the Crown and the primate of Poland.

In 1795, the estate of Włochy was acquired by count Tadeusz Antoni Mostowski, a politician and statesman, who later would become the minister of interior of the Duchy of Warsaw, and the president of the Government Committee of the Interior of the Kingdom of Poland. In 1827, Solipse had 262 inhabitants. In 1845, railway tracks were built passing to the north of Solipse. In 1859, the Warszawa Włochy station was established nearby for cargo trains, and after 1863, it also opened to passenger service. Following the abolition of serfdom in 1864, the area was incorporated into the municipality of Skorosze. Between 1883 and 1888, the Fort V "Włochy" was constructed by the Imperial Russian Army, near Solipse, as part of the city fortifications, known as the Warsaw Fortress. The government heavily restricted construction in its vicinity, hindering the development of the nearby villages, such as Solipse. The fortifications were retired and partially demolished in 1913. Afterwards, their abandoned buildings were taken over by the impoverished and homeless population of Włochy and Solipse, with several small shacks developing in the area. In 1930, the squatter settlement was inhabited by several families, and by 1939, it had a population of around 300 people. Around the year 1800, Solipse had 214 inhabitants. In 1930, the Włochy Cemetery was also founded at the intersection of Ryżowa and Zapusta Streets, to the north of Fort V, being operated by the Roman Catholic Parish of Saints Teresa of the Child Jesus and the Roman Martyrs, based in a wooden chapel was built in Włochy.

On 15 April 1930, Solipse became part of the municipality of Włochy. On 20 October 1933, the settlement became part of the village assembly of Old Włochy, which was a subdivision of the municipality. On 1 April 1939, the municipality was transformed into a town, keeping the name Włochy, inc.

On 8 September 1939, Solipse was captured by the Wehrmacht during the German invasion of Poland in the Second World War. Throughout the conflict, German soldiers were stationed in the town. On 15 November 1940, a ghetto was created in Fort V "Włochy", repurposing abandoned barracks and small shacks in the area. It housed around 300 Jewish residents, forcibly relocated there from Łomianki, Piastów, Ożarów Mazowiecki, and Włochy. For comparison, before the war, the town had around 100 Jewish inhabitants in 1939. The ghetto had poor living conditions and was closed down in February 1941, with its remaining residents being moved to the Warsaw Ghetto. During its existence, the local government and civilians, led by the mayor Franciszek Kostecki, and the Roman Catholic parish, smuggled around 100 people from the ghetto, giving them new identities with documents made in the town hall. Almost all of those responsible for the operation were arrested on 18 November 1942, and later executed in the Auschwitz concentration camp. Following the arrest, the local Catholic parish, as well as several household owners, continued to help in hiding Jewish people in the town. In 1944, the Solipse Cemetery was founded at 1 Na Krańcu Street, to the southeast of Fort V "Włochy", by the Roman Catholic Parish of St. Joseph the Spouse of Our Lady in Ursus. It was originally predominantly used as a burial ground for the Polish civilian and military casualties during the Warsaw Uprising.

On 25 August 1944, the German authorities announced in Włochy that men between the ages of 17 and 35 had to report to them, under the pretence of being taken for an "extraordinary work assignment". Around 300 men who came the next day were rounded up and taken first to the Dulag 121 camp in Pruszków, and from there, to the Mauthausen concentration camp in Austria. On 16 September 1944, the authorities rounded up around 4,500 men, mainly from Włochy, with their ages ranging between 16 and 50, or, according to some sources, 55. This constituted almost the entire working-age male population of the town. They were rounded up in the Combatants Park, from where they were taken to the camp in Pruszków. The majority were then sent to other concentration camps to perform forced labour. Around 3,500 were taken by train, while the rest were forced to walk. It is estimated that up to half of the people forcibly taken from the town in August and September died as a result. On 17 January 1945, Włochy and Okęcie were liberated from the occupation by the Polish People's Army.

The town of Włochy was incorporated into the city of Warsaw on 15 May 1951, becoming part of the Ochota district. On 29 December 1989, following an administrative reform in the city, it became part of the municipality of Warsaw-Ochota. On 25 March 1994, the area was separated, forming a new municipality, named Warsaw-Włochy, after the titular neighbourhood. On 27 October 2002, it was restructured into the city district of Włochy. On 19 May 2004, it was subdivided into the City Information System areas, with Solipse becoming part of the area of Old Włochy.

== Characteristics ==
Solipse is a residential area, consisting of single-family low-rise houses and mid-rise apartment buildings. It's located in the area of Solipska Street, in the southwestern portion of the City Information System area of Old Włochy. The neighbourhood is crossed by the railway line, between stations Warsaw West and Kunowice, with Warszawa Włochy station in its centre. The Fort V "Włochy", a retired historical fortification from 1888, is located to the southeast of Solipse, at the intersection of Ryżowa Street, and Czwartego Czerwca 1989 roku Street, and used as an urban park. Around it are placed two Roman Catholic cemeteries, including Solipse Cemetery to its south, and Włochy Cemetery to its north.
