= Wiktoryn, Warsaw =

Neghbourhood of Warsaw, Poland

Wiktoryn
- Neighbourhood
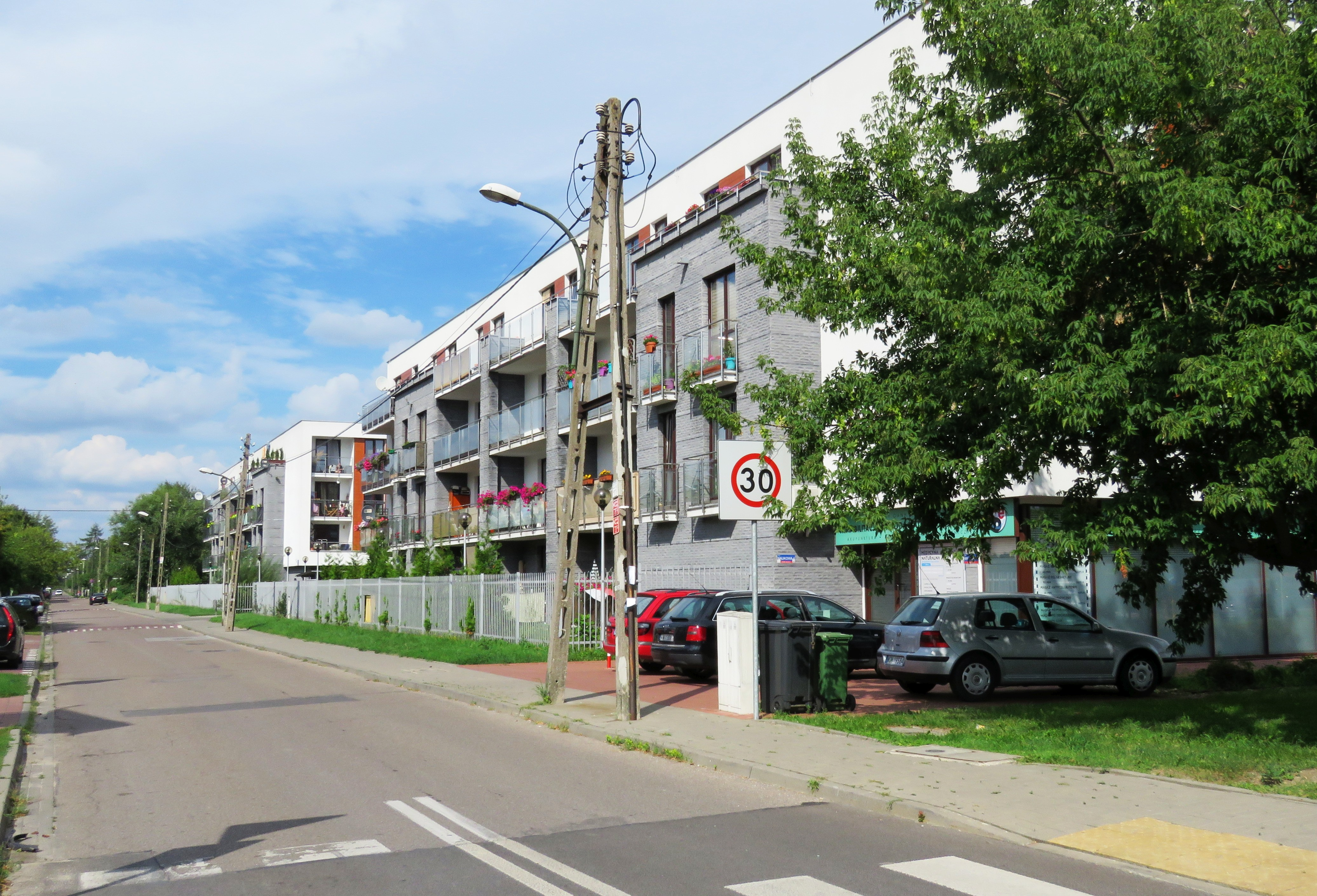
- The apartment buildings on Naukowa Street in Wiktoryn.
- Interactive map of Wiktoryn
- Coordinates: 52.203449°N 20.931730°E
- Country: Poland
- Voivodeship: Masovian
- City county: Warsaw
- District: Włochy
- City Information System area: Old Włochy
- Time zone: UTC+1 (CET)
  - Summer (DST): UTC+2 (CEST)
- Area code: +48 22

Wiktoryn (Polish: [vikˈtɔ.rɘ̟n]) is a neighbourhood of Warsaw, Poland, in the Włochy district. It is located in the area to the northwest from Popularna and Wiktoryn Street, within the southwestern portion of the City Informatation System area of Old Włochy. It is a residential area, dominated by low-rise single family housing, with small presence of apartment buildings. Wiktoryn was founded in the second half of the 19th century, and by 1920s, formed a single suburban aglomeration together with Solipse and Włochy. It was incorporated into the city of Warsaw on 15 May 1951.

== History ==
In 1493, the village of Stojarty was recorded in the area of modern Wiktoryn Street, within the current neighbourhood. It was founded by the Rakowski family of the clan of Radwan, descending from count Gotard of Służew. In the first half of the 17th century, the landed estate of Włochy, which included Stojarty was acquired by Andrzej Leszczyński, the Grand Chancellor of the Crown and the primate of Poland, who built there his manor house around 1650. Stojarty was also recorded for the last time in the 17th century. In 1795, the estate of Włochy was acquired by count Tadeusz Antoni Mostowski, a politician and statesman, who later would become the minister of interior of the Duchy of Warsaw, and the president of the Government Committee of the Interior of the Kingdom of Poland. The hamlet of Wiktoryn was founded to the east of Włochy in the second half of the 19th century. Following the abolition of serfdom in 1864, the area was incorporated into the municipality of Skorosze.

At the turn of the 20th century, a small impoverished neighbourhood, known as Budki Szczęśliwickie, was developed to the southeast from Wiktorynm, as an extension of the village of Szczęśliwice. It consisted of small shacks made from wood, metal, and plywood, placed alongside a street extending to the west from the Kraków Road (now Krakowska Avenue), now forming Włodarzewska and Budki Szczęśliwickie Streets.

By the 1920s, Wiktoryn formed a single suburban agglomeration with nearby Solipse and Włochy. In 1928, a police station was opened in Wiktoryn on Popularna Street (then known as Kościuszki Street), which served the entire aglomeration.

In 1927, the tracks of the Electric Commuter Railway were constructed passing to the south of Wiktoryn, with the station opened near the village near Chylońska Street. The line formed a connection between Warsaw and Grodzisk Mazowiecki. In 1932, a branch line was constructed alongside Popularna Street, extending the railway line to Warszawa Włochy station. The Wiktoryn station was moved to the new line, at the intersection of Popularna and Krańcowa Streets, and was later renamed to Warszawa Włochy Graniczna. The Electric Commuter Railway line was closed down in 1971, together with all of its stations in the area, except Warszawa Raków.

On 15 April 1930, Włochy became the seat of a new municipality, named after it, which also included the village of Solipse, and hamlets of Marianówki and Wiktoryn-Rappówek, as well, as small farming settlements extending from Wiktoryn. On 20 October 1933, the municipality was divided into two village assemblies divided by the railway tracks, with Old Włochy in the south, which included Wiktoryn. On 1 April 1939, the municipality was transformed into a town, keeping the name Włochy.

On 8 September 1939, Wiktoryn and Włochy were captured by the Wehrmacht during the German invasion of Poland in the Second World War. Throughout the conflict, German soldiers were stationed in the town. On 25 August 1944, the German authorities announced in Włochy that men between the ages of 17 and 35 had to report to them, under the pretence of being taken for an "extraordinary work assignment". Around 300 men who came the next day were rounded up and taken first to the Dulag 121 camp in Pruszków, and from there, to the Mauthausen concentration camp in Austria. On 16 September 1944, the authorities rounded up around 4,500 men, mainly from Włochy, with their ages ranging between 16 and 50, or, according to some sources, 55. This constituted almost the entire working-age male population of the town. They were rounded up in the Combatants Park, from where they were taken to the camp in Pruszków. The majority were then sent to other concentration camps to perform forced labour. Around 3,500 were taken by train, while the rest were forced to walk. It is estimated that up to half of the people forcibly taken from the town in August and September died as a result. On 17 January 1945, Włochy and Wiktoryn were liberated from the occupation by the Polish People's Army.

In 1946, Wiktoryn had 461 residents. Wiktoryn and Włochy were incorporated into the city of Warsaw on 15 May 1951, becoming part of the Ochota district. On 29 December 1989, following an administrative reform in the city, the area became part of the municipality of Warsaw-Ochota. On 25 March 1994, the area, including Okęcie, Opacz Wielka, Raków, Salomea, Włochy, and Załuski, was separated, forming a new municipality, named Warsaw-Włochy, after the titular neighbourhood. On 27 October 2002, it was restructured into the city district of Włochy. On 19 May 2004, it was subdivided into the City Information System areas, with Wiktoryn becoming part of the area of Old Włochy, to the south.
