= Centrum Łopuszańska 22 =

Shopping mall in Warsaw, Poland

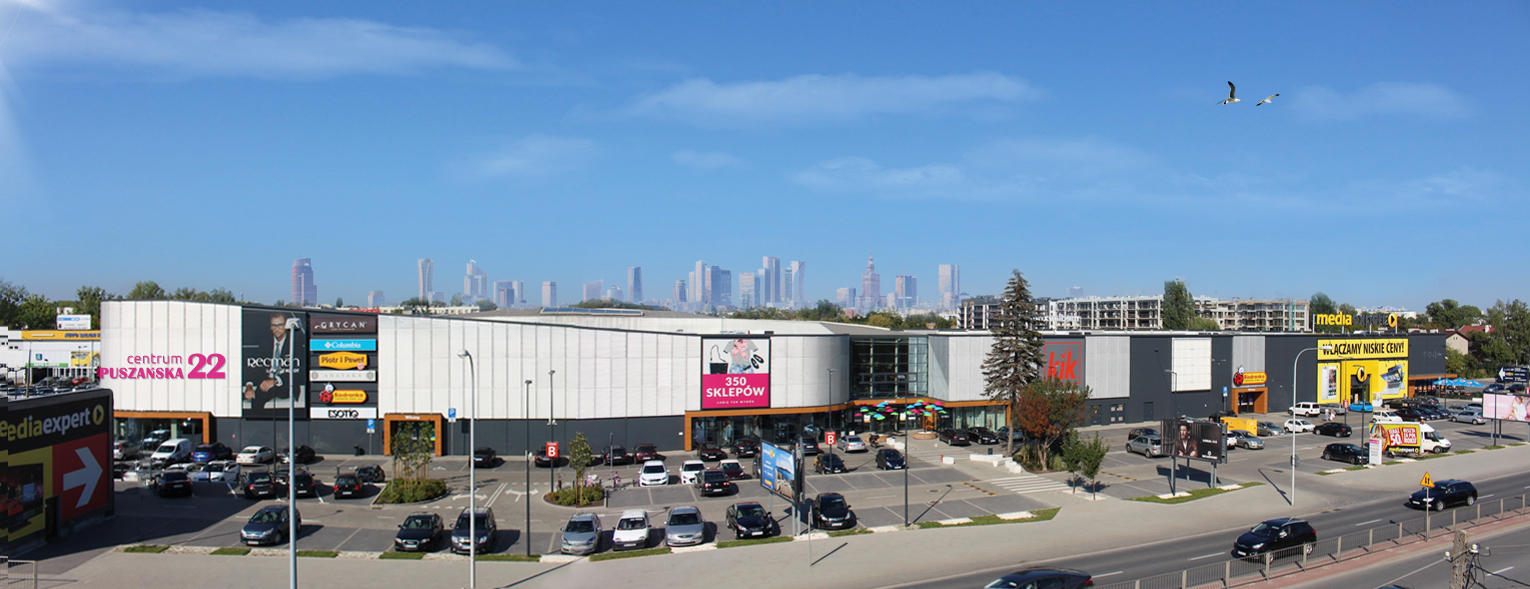
- Centrum Łopuszańska 22 in 2017.

General information
- Type: Shopping centre
- Location: 22 Łopuszańska Street, Włochy, Warsaw, Masovian Voivodeship, Poland
- Coordinates: 52°11′31″N 20°57′05″E
- Completed: 17 October 2015

Technical details
- Floor count: 1
- Floor area: 28,000 m^{2} (301,389.49 sq ft)

Design and construction
- Architecture firm: APA Wojciechowski Architekci
- Developer: Devin Investments
- Main contractor: Fundamental Group

Website
- centrumlopuszanska22.pl

Centrum Łopuszańska 22 (Polish pronunciation: [ˈt͡sɛn.trum wɔ.puˈʂaɲ.ska dvaˈd͡ʑɛɕ.t͡ɕa ˈdva]; lit. '22 Łopuszno Street Centre') is a shopping mall in the city of Warsaw in Masovian Voivodeship, Poland. It is located at 22 Łopuszańska Street, within the neighbourhood of Raków in the Włochy district. It was opened in 2015.

== History ==
The construction of the shopping mall began in October 2014. It was developed by Devin Investments, designed by the architecture firm APA Wojciechowski Architekci, and constructed by the company Fundamental Group. The building was opened on 17 October 2015 under the name Modo Domy Mody (lit. 'Modo Fashion Stores'). On 8 June 2017, it was rebranded to Centrum Łopuszańska 22.

== Characteristics ==
22 Łopuszańska Street is a shopping mall with 1 storyes and a total floor area of 28,000 m^{2} (301,389.49 sq ft), of which 16,000 m^{2} is dedicated to the stores. The shopping mall is located at 22 Łopuszańska Street. It is 1-storey-tall and has the total usable area of 28,000 m^{2}, of which 16,000 m^{2} (172,222.57 aq ft) is dedicated to the stores and services. In 2020, the building contained 130 stores and 11 restaurants and bars.
