= Anna Olimpia Mostowska =

Anna Olimpia Mostowska, née Radziwiłł (c. 1762, Nieśwież - 1810, Zasław), was a writer from the Polish–Lithuanian Commonwealth and later the Russian Empire. She published her first historical novel in 1807. Her name derives from her second husband, the Polish writer and statesman, Tadeusz Mostowski.

== Works ==
- 1806 Moje rozrywki

Volume I Strach w Zameczku; Posąg i Salamandra (translated from Christoph Martin Wieland);
Volume II Matylda i Daniło; Cudowny szafir (translated from Stéphanie Félicité, comtesse de Genlis);
Volume III Zamek Koniecpolskich; Nie zawsze tak się czyni, jak się mówi;

- 1807 Astolda
- 1809 Zabawki w spoczynku po trudach
1. Pokuta (translated from Genlis);
2. Historya filozoficzna Adyla;
3. Sen wróżebny;
4. Miłość i Psyche (translated from Apuleius);
5. Lewita z Efraim (after Napoleon Lemercière)
