= Space Gardens =

Urban park in Warsaw, Poland

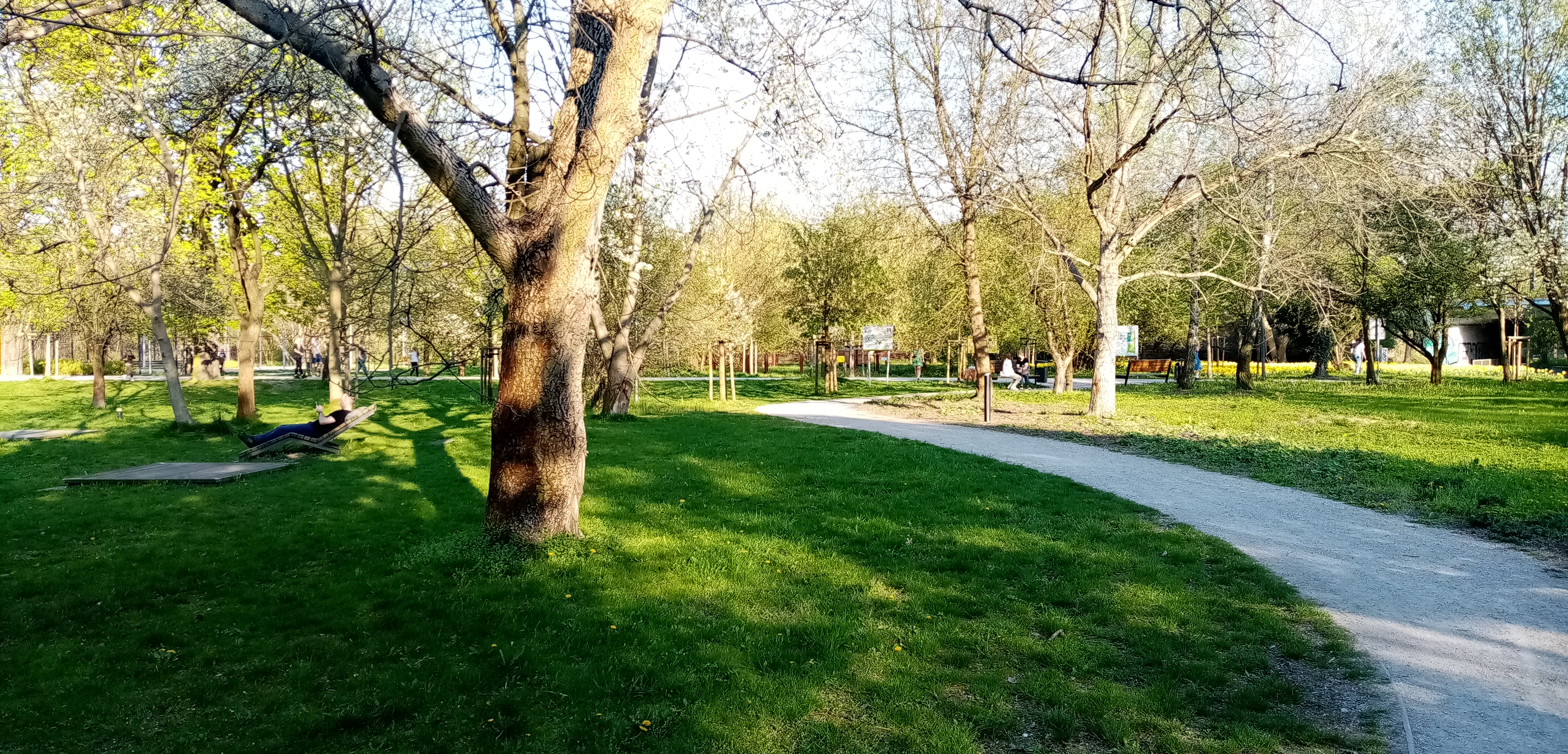
- The park in 2023.
- Interactive map of Space Gardens
- Type: Urban park
- Location: Włochy, Warsaw, Poland
- Coordinates: 52.209600°N 20.922524°E
- Area: c. 3 ha
- Created: 17 May 2019

The Space Gardens (Polish: Ogrody Kosmosu) is an urban park in Warsaw, Poland, located in the district of Włochy. It is placed between Sympatyczna Street, Plastyczna Street, and railway tracks, within the neighbourhood of New Włochy, and has an area of around 3 ha. It was opened in 2019.

== History ==
The area of the park used to be allotment gardens, and after they were closed, remained undeveloped. In 2013, it was proposed to construct there an urban park, and the works lasted from 2017 to 2019. The investment costed over 2 million Polish złoties. It was opened on 17 May 2019, and covers an area of around 3 ha.
