= Warsaw Fortress =

Defensive system in 19th-century Poland

Coordinates: 52°15′53″N 20°59′58″E

- Warsaw, Poland

Site information
- Type: Bastions, citadel, forts
- Controlled by: Imperial Russia (until 1915); Germany (1915–1918, 1939–1945); Poland (1918–1939, since 1945)

Site history
- Built: 1832 (citadel) – 1913
- Battles/wars: 1920, 1939

Warsaw Fortress (Polish: Twierdza Warszawa, Russian: Варшавская крепость) was a system of fortifications built in Warsaw, Poland during the 19th century when the city was part of the Russian Empire. The fortress belonged to a chain of fortresses built in Congress Poland and the region adjacent to it during this period. It was built in stages, with the first part, known as Warsaw Citadel, built in the years 1832–1834, in the immediate aftermath of the November Uprising of 1830. This initial fortification was then continually improved by the addition of further forts in its vicinity, with the work finally completed in 1874. In 1879 the Russian imperial government decided to carry out a major expansion of the fortress, which would incorporate a system of large forts surrounding the whole city. Twenty forts forming this new system were constructed between 1883 and 1890. There were plans to combine the Warsaw Fortress with the nearby Modlin Fortress by building a chain of connecting forts, but this work was only partially carried out. Rapid progress in the power of siege artillery required the forts to be continually strengthened. In the final period of its existence, the system consisted of 29 forts and major works, including the older forts of the original citadel, which were reinforced by numerous smaller fieldworks.

As a result of the defeat in the war with Japan in 1904–1905, the Russian Empire carried out a major rethinking of its military strategy. As part of this reevaluation and the resulting changes in strategic deployments, it was decided that maintaining the Warsaw Fortress was no longer cost-effective. In 1909 the decision was made to abolish the fortress, and demolition work began but proceeded slowly. In 1913, with the worsening international situation immediately before the outbreak of the First World War, the decision was reversed, and hasty work was started to return the fortress to combat readiness. These defenses were never put to the test, as Warsaw was evacuated by the Russian army without a fight in August 1915, during its general retreat that summer.

After Poland regained its independence in 1918 the dismantling of some fortifications resumed, others were taken over by the Polish Army and used as storage sites or barracks, though over the years these were gradually abandoned. Some forts were briefly prepared for defense during the Battle of Warsaw in 1920, others saw heavy fighting during the siege of the city in September 1939 though their defensive strength was vastly reduced due to advances in military technology. In the 21st century many of the forts are still in existence, but some were built over and no trace of them remains. The city lacks a unified concept for their use, though their historical value is recognized. They are mostly unmaintained and hence not open to the public for sightseeing. Only the citadel and some of its adjacent forts are well maintained and open to tourists.

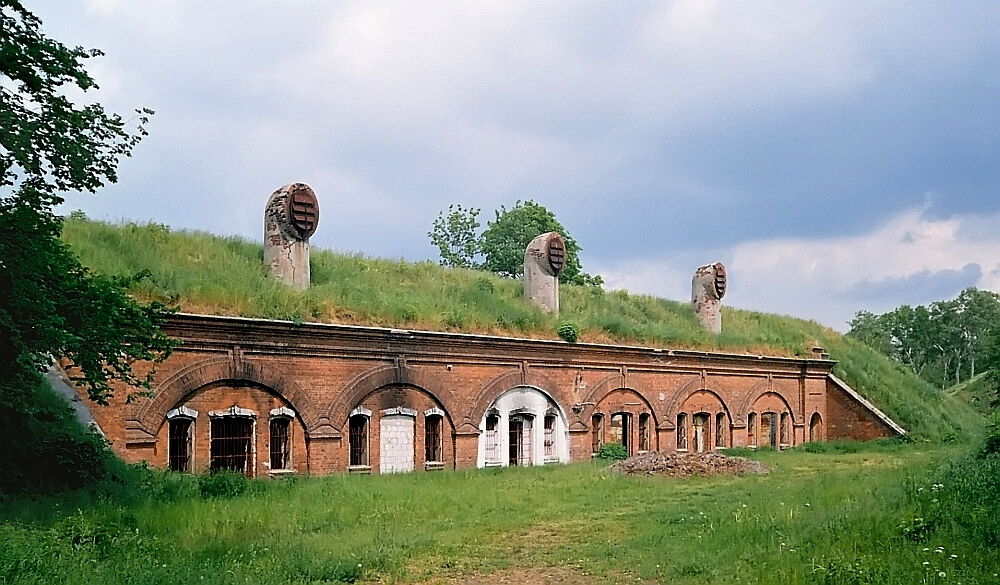
Barracks in Fort P Bema

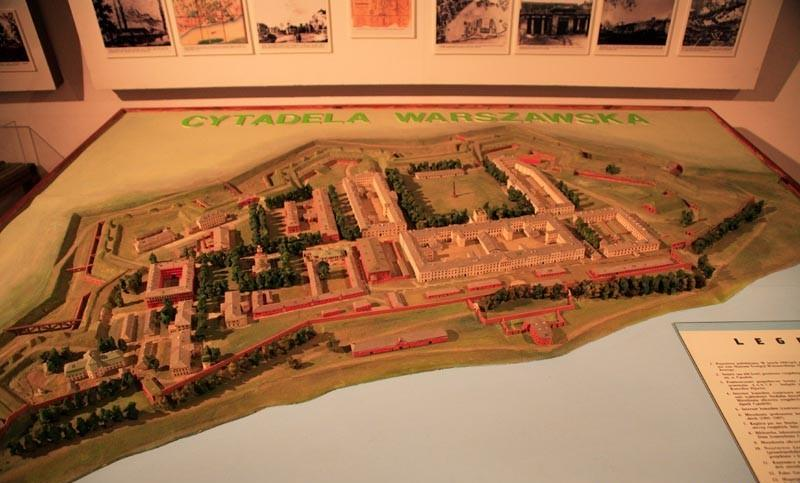
Model of Warsaw Citadel

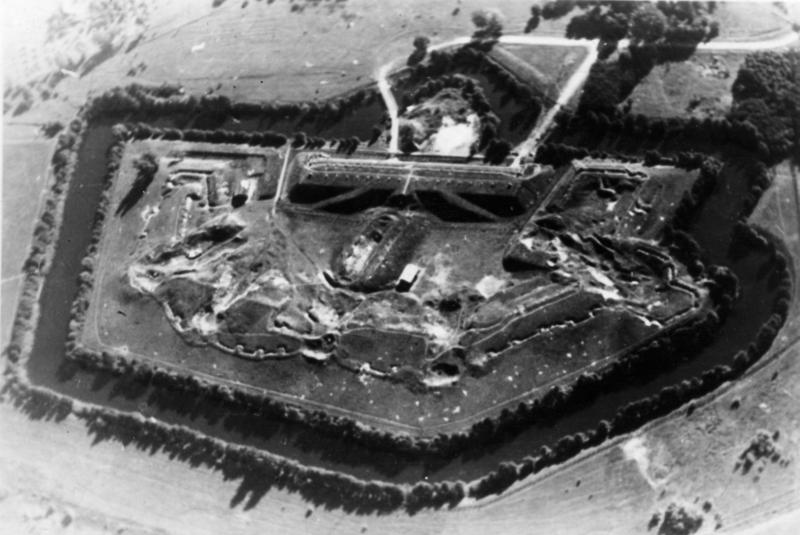
Fort II Wawrzyszew in 1939

Forts of Warsaw and Modlin Fortress, with connecting works (some never built)
