= Andrzej Leszczyński (1608–1658) =

Roman Catholic archbishop (1608–1658)

His Excellency Andrzej Leszczynski
- Archbishop of Gniezno; Primate of Poland
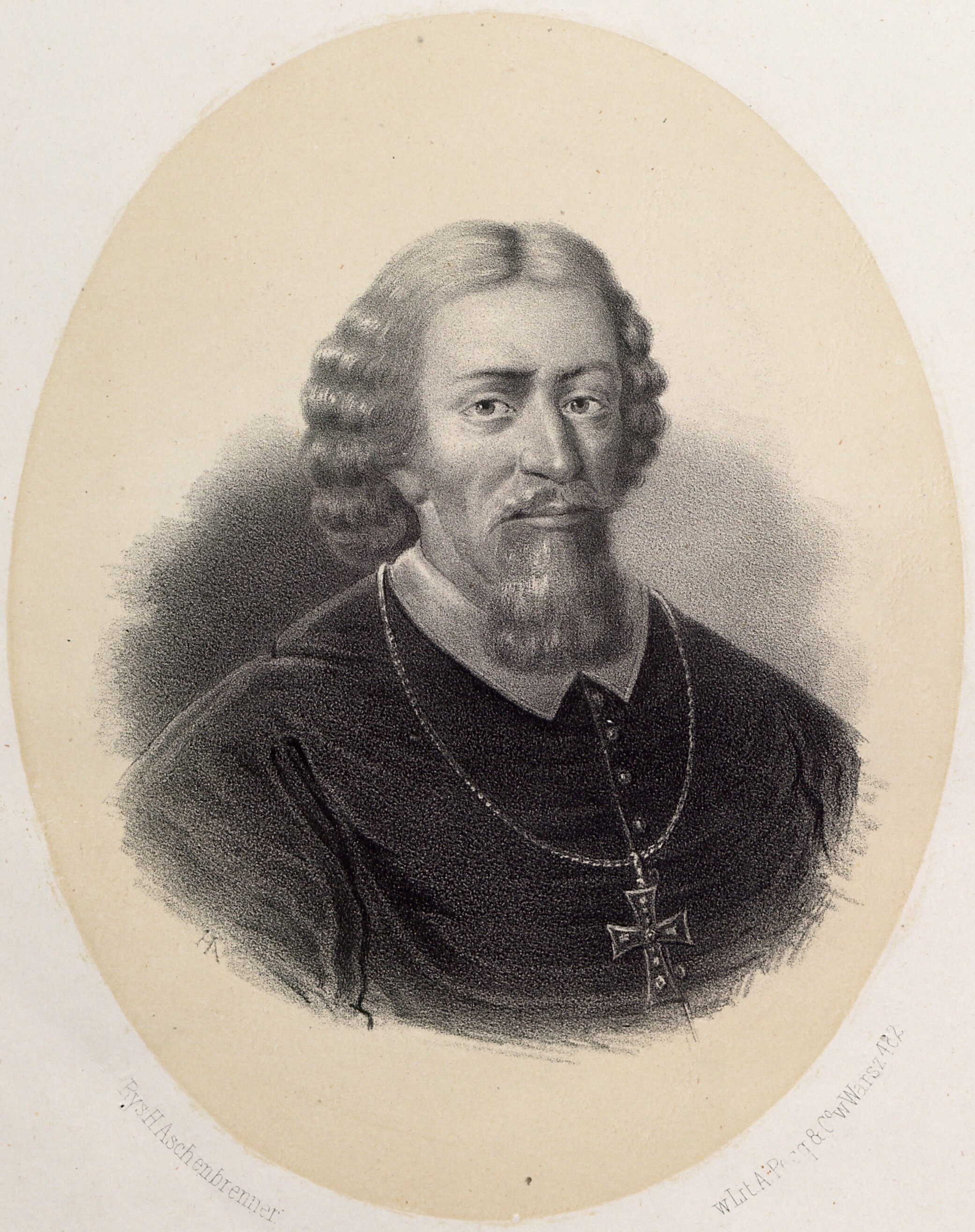
- Church: Roman Catholic
- Archdiocese: Gniezno
- Installed: 1653
- Term ended: 1658

Orders
- Ordination: 18 December 1633
- Consecration: 1642

Personal details
- Born: 1608 Gołuchów
- Died: 15 April 1658 (aged 49–50) Skierniewice
- Buried: Łowicz
- Coat of arms

Andrzej Leszczyński (1608–1658), of Wieniawa coat of arms, was a Polish–Lithuanian Commonwealth noble and priest.

== Biography ==
He was the son of Wacław Leszczyński. He became a priest in 1633. Chancellor of queen Cecylia Renata from 1636. Bishop of Kamieniec from 1640. Deputy Chancellor of the Crown from 1645. Bishop of Chełmno from 1646. Grand Chancellor of the Crown from 1650. Archbishop of Gniezno and primate of Poland from 1653 to 1658.

He was Abbot of Czerwińsk from 1642 to 1644 and Abbot of the Benedictine abbey in Tyniec from 1644 to 1646.

Catholic Church titles
Preceded by Maciej II Łubieński	Primate of Poland; Archbishop of Gniezno; 1653–1658	Succeeded by Waclaw Leszczynski
