= Tadeusz Antoni Mostowski =

Polish writer, journalist, literary critic and politician

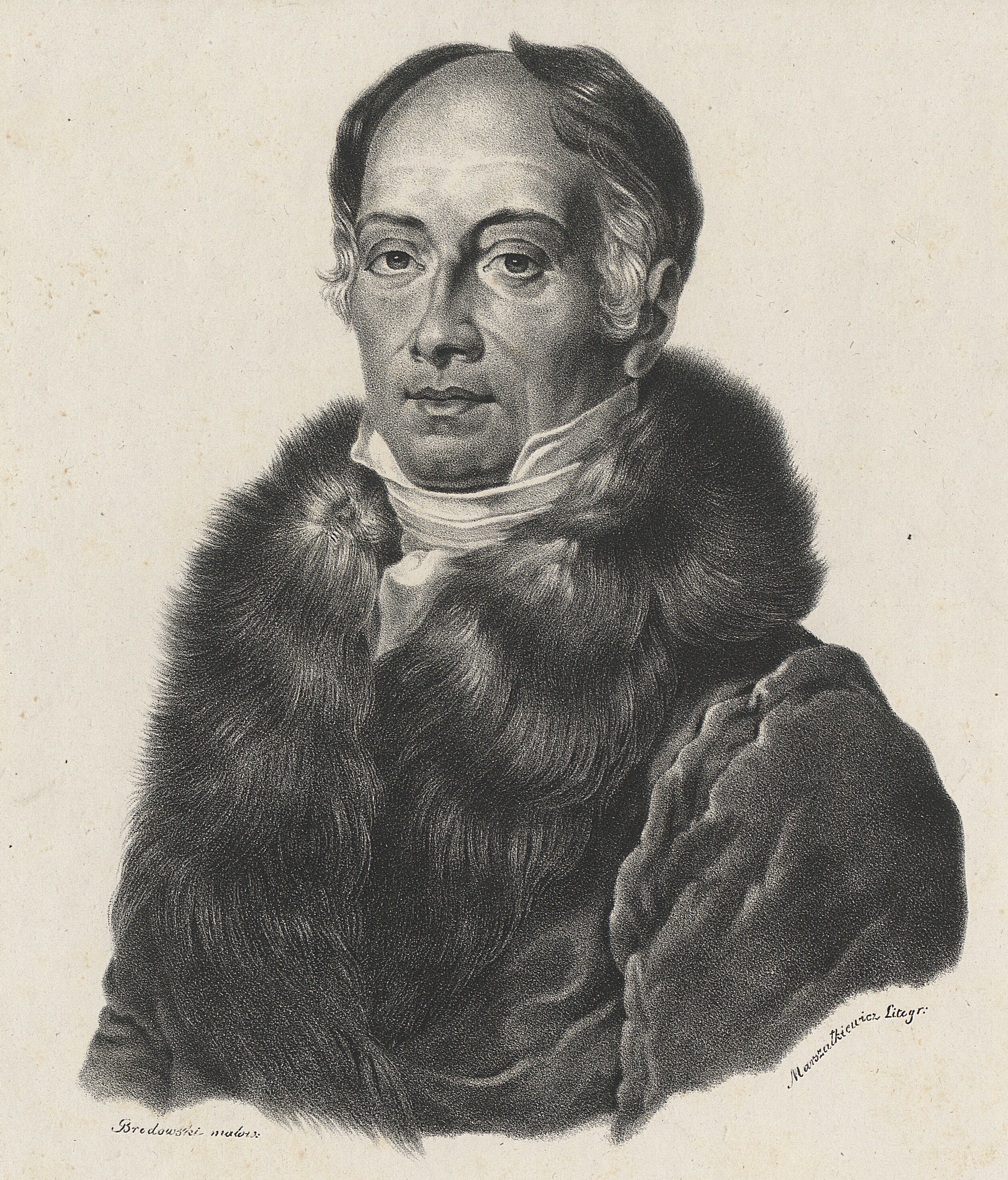
Tadeusz Mostowski; portrait by Stanisław Marszałkiewicz

Tadeusz Antoni Mostowski (19 October 1766 in Warsaw – 6 December 1842 in Paris) was a Polish writer, journalist, literary critic and politician.

== Biography ==
He was the son of Paweł Michał Mostowski, a noted military commander. He was raised in an intellectual atmosphere and studied at the Collegium Nobilium. In 1780, he became an Assessor and was later elected a member of the Great Sejm. In 1790, he was a Podstoli for the Masovian Voivodeship and also became a Castellan in Raciąż, thereby gaining a place in the Senat.

He was a supporter of the Patriotic Party and helped create the Friends of the Constitution. In 1792, together with Julian Ursyn Niemcewicz and Józef Weyssenhoff, he published the Gazeta Narodowa i Obca. During the period of the Targowica Confederation he left Poland; eventually arriving in Paris, where he became a mediator in talks between Polish emigrants and French revolutionary authorities. After the defeat of the Girondists, he was imprisoned but soon released and allowed to return home. There, he found himself persecuted and detained by Jacob von Sievers, a deputy of Empress Catherine the Great.

In 1794, he joined the Kościuszko Uprising; becoming a member of the Provisional Council of the Duchy of Masovia and the Supreme National Council. When the uprising collapsed, he was taken into house arrest in Saint Petersburg. He was released following an amnesty in 1795 and, in 1797, he once again went to Paris. He remained there until 1802, then established himself at what is now known as the Mostowski Palace, which he had inherited in 1795. He also resumed his publishing enterprise, with the latest equipment brought in from Paris. He was in France again for much of 1812.

Later that year, he became the Minister of the Interior for the Duchy of Warsaw. From 1815 to 1830, he served as the presiding minister for the Government Commission for Internal Affairs of Congress Poland. While in that position, he helped promote construction of the Augustów Canal and established the Instytut Agronomiczny (Agronomic Institute) in Marymont. During those years, he remained active as a writer; publishing literary criticism and theatre reviews in numerous Warsaw journals. He was also an honorary member of the Warsaw Society of Friends of Learning.

In 1825, he was appointed to the Senate. During the November Uprising, he absented himself from that body's meetings. When the uprising had been quashed, the Russian authorities allowed him to emigrate to France, where he owned lands inherited from his father. He died there ten years later, and was interred at Montmartre Cemetery.

His first wife was the writer, Anna Olimpia Przeździecka, whom he married in 1787 and divorced in 1804. He was her second husband and they had no children. His second marriage, to Marianna Potocka (1780-1837), a member of the noble Potocki family, produced five children.
