= Gotard of Służew =

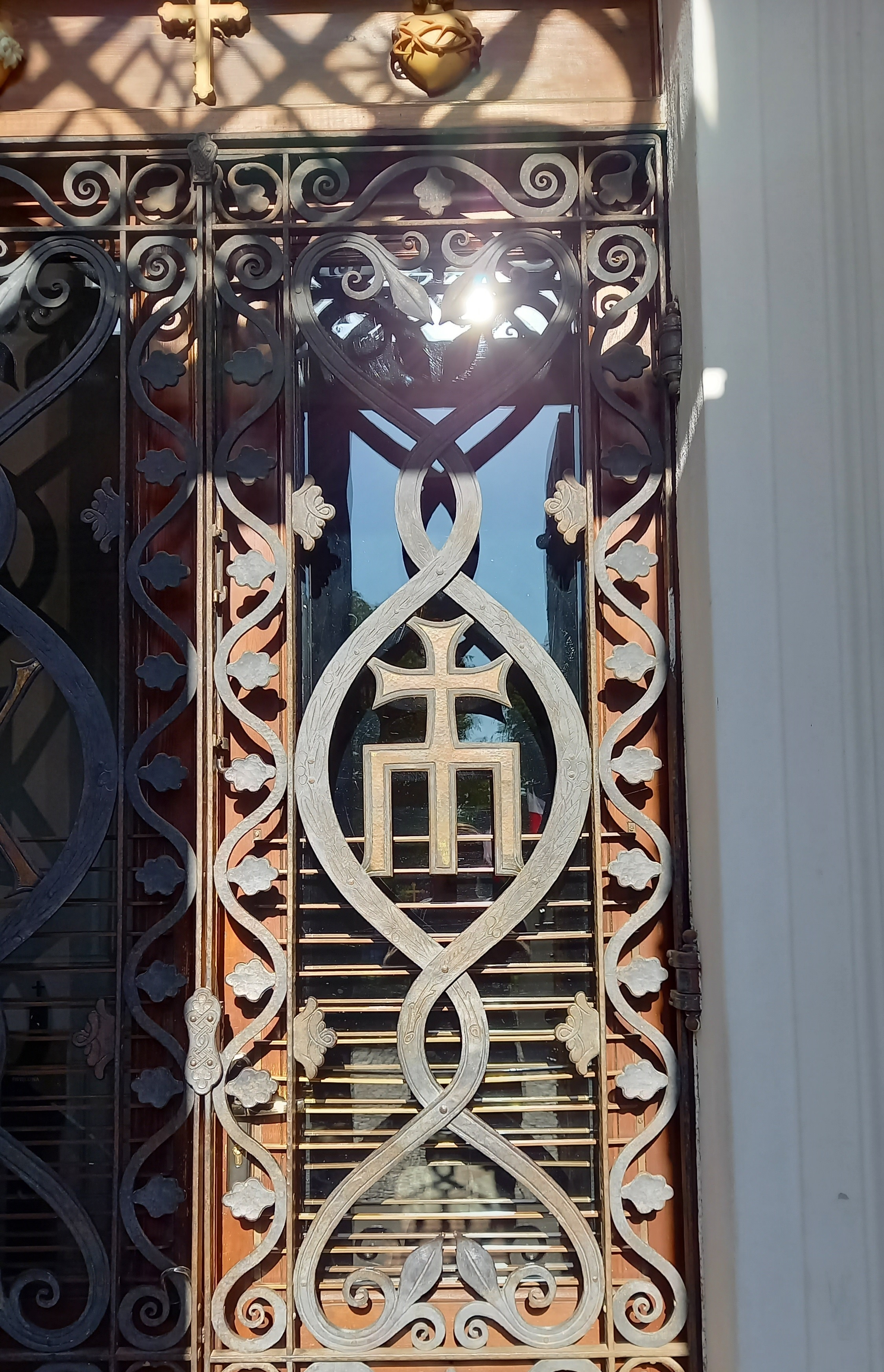
The emblem of the Radwan-Wierzbowa clan, at the gate of St. Catherine's Church in Warsaw.

Gotard of Służew (Polish pronunciation: [ˈɡɔ.tart ... ˈswu.ʐɛf]; Polish: Gotard ze Służewa) was a 13th-century knight and count from the Duchy of Masovia. He served under duke Konrad I of Masovia, and later duke Bolesław I of Masovia. He was also castellan of Wizna. Gotard begun the Radwan-Wierzbowa clan, related to the Radwan heraldic clan. His descendants formed noble families of Służewski, Rakowiecki, Rusiecki, and Okęcki.

== Biography ==
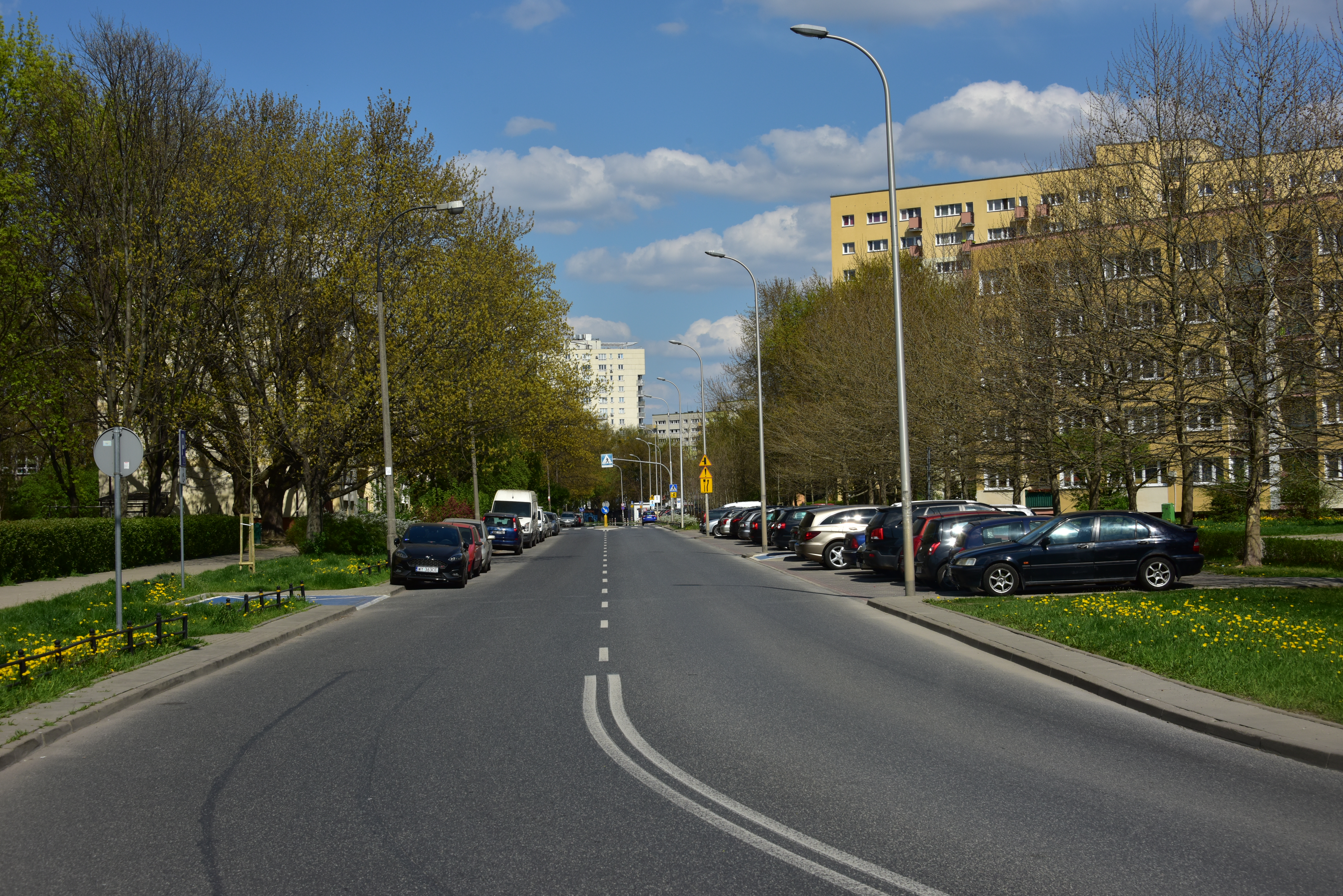
Gotarda Street in Warsaw, Poland, in 2022.

Gotard was the son of Łuka (or Łukasz). He was a magnate, knight and military leader in the Duchy of Masovia, serving under duke Konrad I of Masovia, and later duke Bolesław I of Masovia. Gotard was also a castellan of Wizna. He fought in defensive wars against tribes of Old Prussians and Yotvingians, during which, he took captive seven Yotvingian leaders. They were then exchanged for a massive ransome paid in silver. In 1231, Duke Konrad I awarded him with the land estate of Raków, which was later expanded on 27 April 1245, with the addition of Służew.

He began the Radwan-Wierzbowa clan, related to the Radwan heraldic clan. His descendants formed noble families of Służewski, Rakowiecki, Rusiecki, and Okęcki. The Rakowiecki and Służewski families owned Raków and Służew estates respectively until the 17th century.

== Legacy ==
On 24 November 1961, a street in Warsaw, Poland was named after Gotard. It is located in the Mokotów district, within the neighbourhood of Służewiec.
