= Zebrzydowski =

Polish noble family

Radwan coat of arms of the Zebrzydowski family

The Zebrzydowski (feminine form: Zebrzydowska, plural: Zebrzydowscy) was a Polish noble family.

== History ==
The family became important in the second half of the 16th and early 17th century in the First Republic of Poland. Grand Marshal of the Crown Mikołaj Zebrzydowski was one of the key people of the rokosz of 1606 against King Sigismund III Vasa, the so-called Zebrzydowski Rebellion.

Their family seat was Zebrzydowice, Lesser Poland Voivodeship.

== Coat of arms ==
The coat of arms of the House of Zebrzydowski was Radwan.

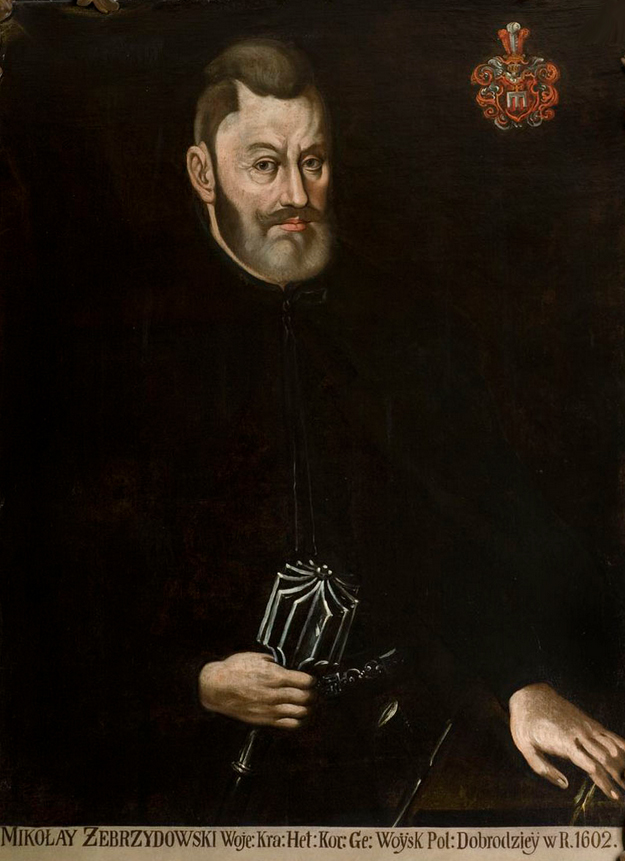
Mikołaj Zebrzydowski

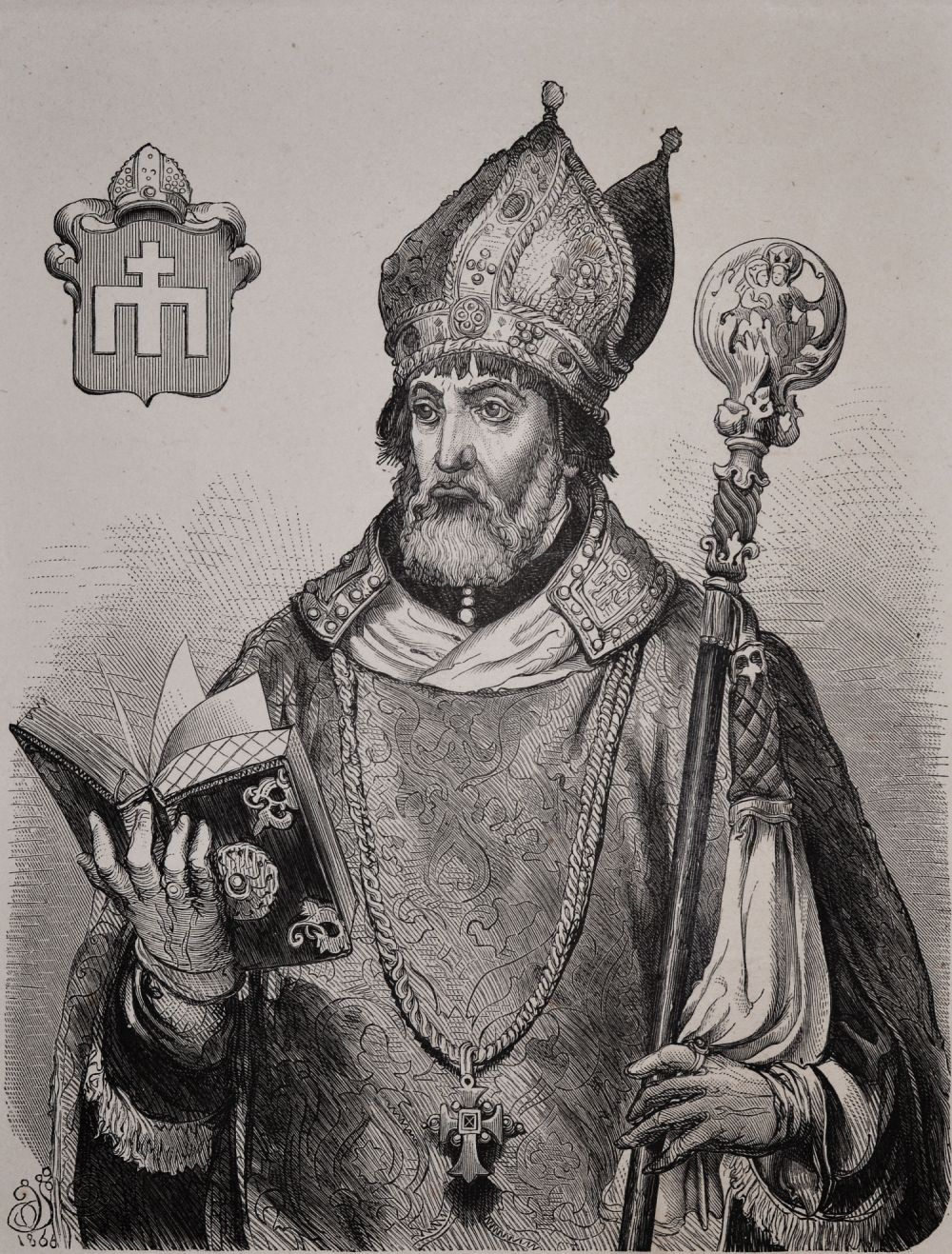
Andrzej Zebrzydowski, Bishop of Kraków

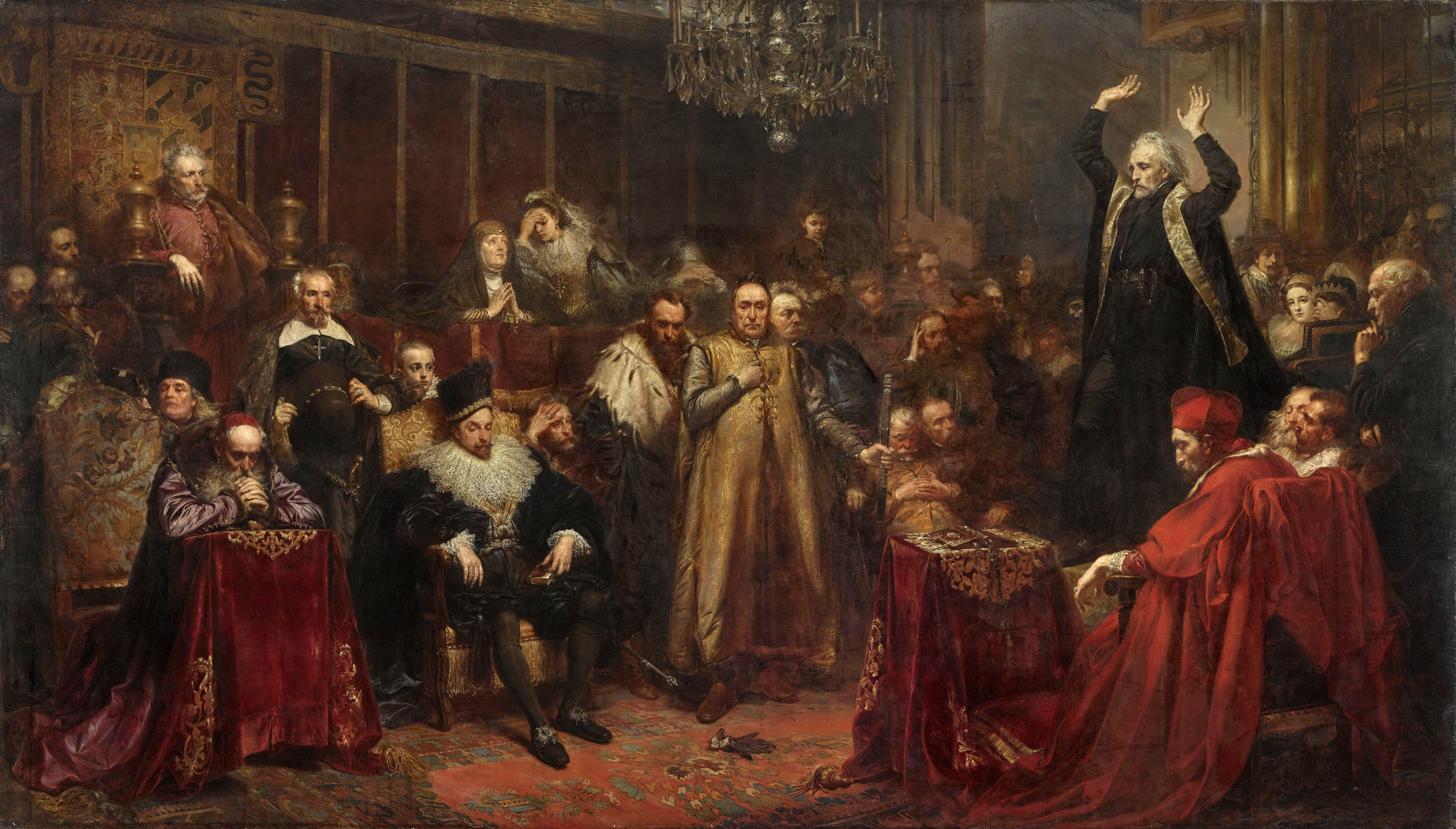
"Skarga's Sermon" by Jan Matejko. Mikołaj Zebrzydowski is standing in center, dressed in the golden kontusz.

== Notable members ==
- Mikołaj Zebrzydowski z Sitna (died c. 1503), married Elżbieta Więcborska
  - Wojciech Zebrzydowski z Więcborka (died c. 1525), starost of Żnin, married Elżbieta Krzycka z Krzycka h. Kotwicz
    - Andrzej Zebrzydowski (1496–1560), Bishop of Kraków
    - Bartłomiej Zebrzydowski (died before 1561), voivode of Inowrocław and Brześć Kujawski, married Countess Jadwiga Tęczyńska h. Topór
    - Kasper Zebrzydowski (died 1584), voivode of Kalisz and Royal rotmistrz, married Anna Jordan h. Trąby
      - Andrzej Zebrzydowski z Więcborka (died c. 1595), castellan of Śremy, married Agnieszka Białośliwska h. Topór
        - Kasper Zebrzydowski z Więcborka (died 1649), castellan of Kalisz, married Anna Daniłowicz h. Sas and Anna Dembińska z Dembian h. Rawicz
    - Mikołaj Zebrzydowski (1494–1568), starost of Raciąż, married Anna Sampobolska h. Nałęcz
      - Mikołaj Zebrzydowski (died before 1605), married Urszula Korzbok Zawadzka h. Korzbok
        - Anna Zebrzydowska (died 1640), married Court Standard-Bearer of the Crown Sebastian Sobieski h. Janina
      - Andrzej Zebrzydowski (died before 1615)
        - Melchior Zebrzydowski (died after 1648), married Katarzyna Łaźniewska and Zofia Karniewska z Dłużniew
          - Adam Zebrzydowski (died after 1646), married Anna Marchocka h. Ostoja
            - Józef Bernard Zebrzydowski (1642–1710), canon of Kraków, Chancellor of Prince Jakub Ludwik Sobieski h. Janina
- Fabian Zebrzydowski, married NN Pisarzowska
  - Jan Zebrzydowski (died before 1538), Royal rotmistrz, castellan of Oświęcim, married Felicja Przypkowska
    - Florian Zebrzydowski (died 1562), Field Hetman of the Crown, married Zofia Dzik z Pieśni h. Doliwa
      - Mikołaj Zebrzydowski (1553–1620), Grand Marshal of the Crown and Hetman, married Dorota Herburt h. Herburt
        - Jan Zebrzydowski (1583–1641), Miecznik of the Crown, starost of Lanckorona, married Barbara Lubomirska h. Szreniawa
          - Michał Zebrzydowski (1613–1667), voivode of Kraków, the last male representative of the Zebrzydowski family, married Marianna Stadnicka ze Żmigrodu h. Szreniawa
          - Franciszek Florian Zebrzydowski (1615–1650), castellan of Lublin, married Anna Zofia Zenowicz h. Deszpot

== See also ==
- City of Kalwaria Zebrzydowska, established in 1600 by Mikołaj Zebrzydowski

== Bibliography ==
- Dworzaczek Włodzimierz, Genealogia, Warszawa 1959
