= Kalwaria Zebrzydowska Park =

Religious heritage site in Poland

UNESCO World Heritage Site
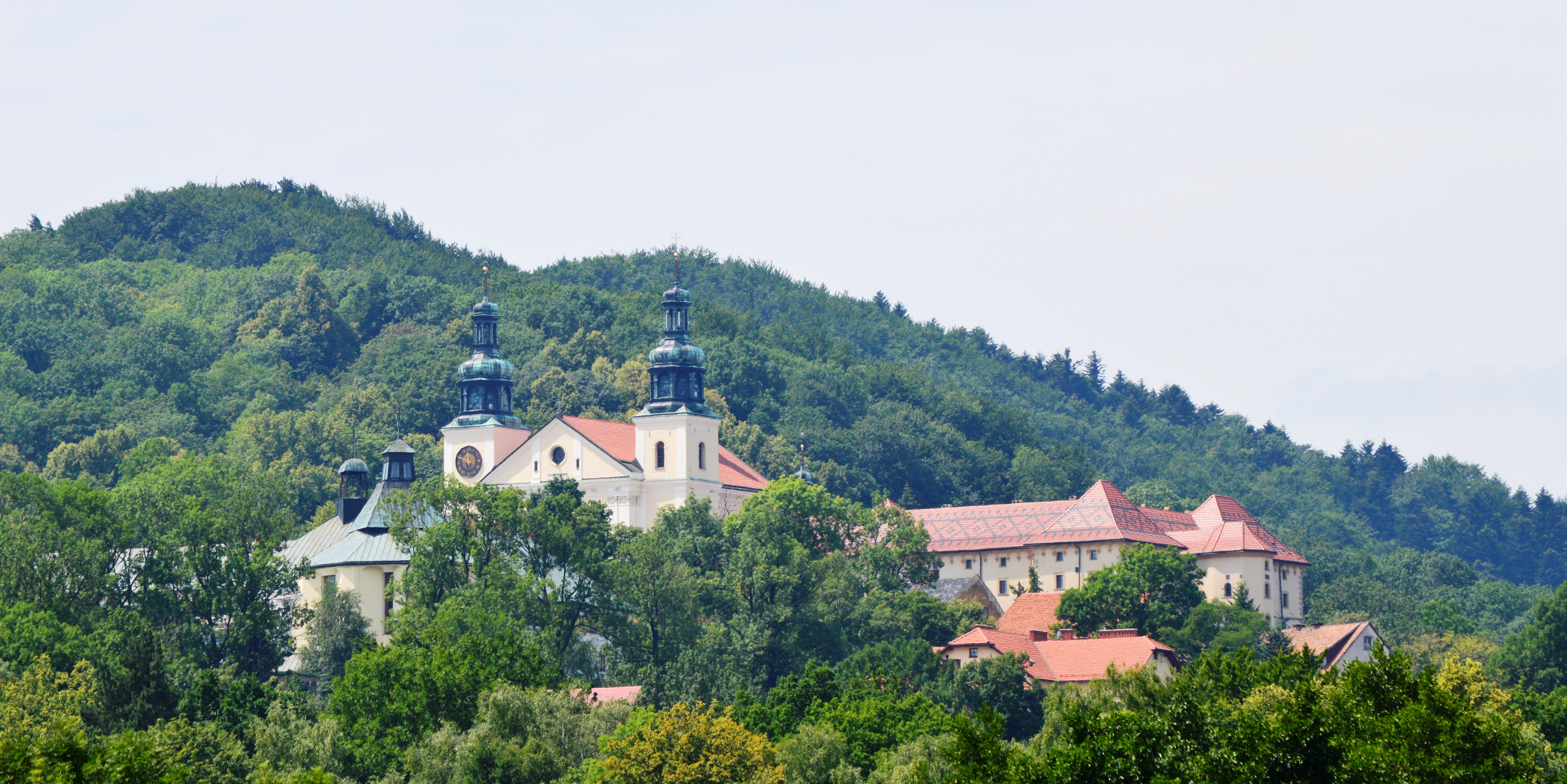
- General view of the monastery

- Location within Lesser Poland Voivodeship Location within Poland
- Official name: Kalwaria Zebrzydowska: the Mannerist Architectural and Park Landscape Complex and Pilgrimage Park
- Location: Kalwaria Zebrzydowska, Gmina Kalwaria Zebrzydowska, Wadowice County, Lesser Poland Voivodeship, Poland
- Criteria: Cultural: (ii), (iv)
- Reference: 905
- Inscription: 1999 (23rd Session)
- Area: 380 ha (940 acres)
- Buffer zone: 2,600 ha (6,400 acres)
- Website: www.kalwaria.eu
- Coordinates: 49°52′N 19°40′E

Kalwaria Zebrzydowska Park is a Mannerist architectural and park landscape complex and pilgrimage park, built in the 17th century as the Counter Reformation in the late 16th century led to prosperity in the creation of calvaries in Catholic Europe.

The park, located near the town of Kalwaria Zebrzydowska, which took its name from the park, was added in 1999 to the UNESCO list of World Heritage Sites. The site is also one of Poland's official national Historic Monuments (Pomnik historii), as designated November 17, 2000, and tracked by the National Heritage Board of Poland.

== History ==
Kalwaria Zebrzydowska was established in 1600 by Mikołaj Zebrzydowski, voivode of Kraków for Franciscan friars (custodians of the Holy Sepulchre in Jerusalem). It was modelled on the 1584 map of Jerusalem by Christian Kruik van Adrichem.

== Basilica of St. Mary ==
Basilica of St. Mary was established by Mikołaj Zebrzydowski for Bernardines. The church was designed by Giovanni Maria Bernardoni and the construction process was conducted by Paul Baudarth, an architect and goldsmith from Antwerp, between 1603 and 1609.

== Chapels ==
Calvary park consists of 42 chapels modelled and named after the places in Jerusalem and Holy Land. There are two main paths - one devoted to Jesus Christ and the other one devoted to Holy Mary. The first has 24 chapels, the second 11 chapels, the rest are common to both of them. The most interesting are:

- Ecce Homo Chapel was built on the plan of the Greek cross between 1605 and 1609 by Paul Baudarth. The vault adorned with profuse stucco decorations in the style of Dutch mannerism.
- Chapel of the Crucifixion is the first structure built by Mikołaj Zebrzydowski in Kalwaria and give a beginning to the whole complex. It was constructed between 1600 and 1601.
- Heart of Mary Chapel was built on the plan of a heart in 1615 by Paul Baudarth. The chapel commemorate Jesus' encounter with Mary on the road to Calvary.
- Church of the Dormition of St. Mary was built between 1615 and 1642 in mannerist style. It is one of the biggest objects in the park.

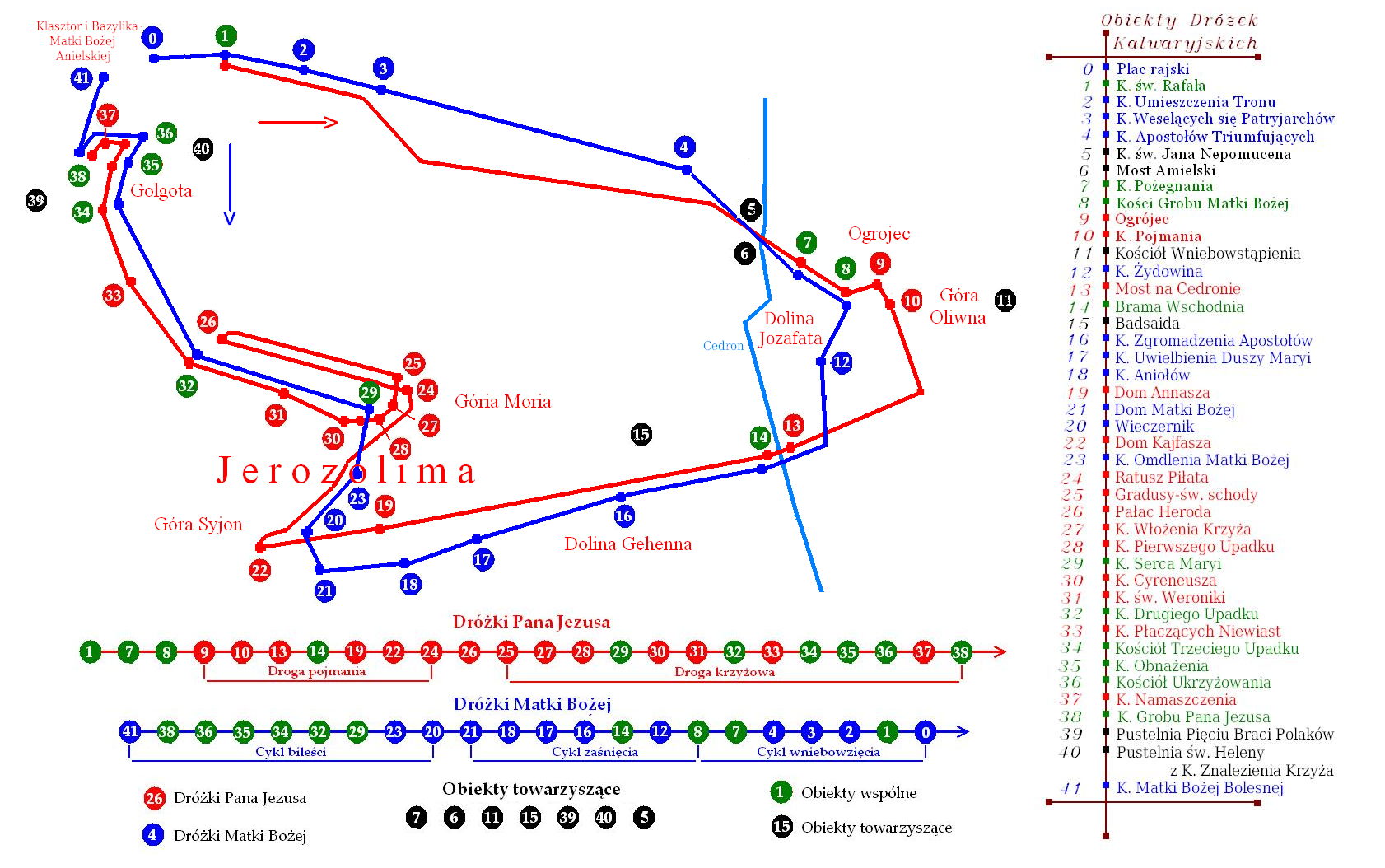

== Images ==
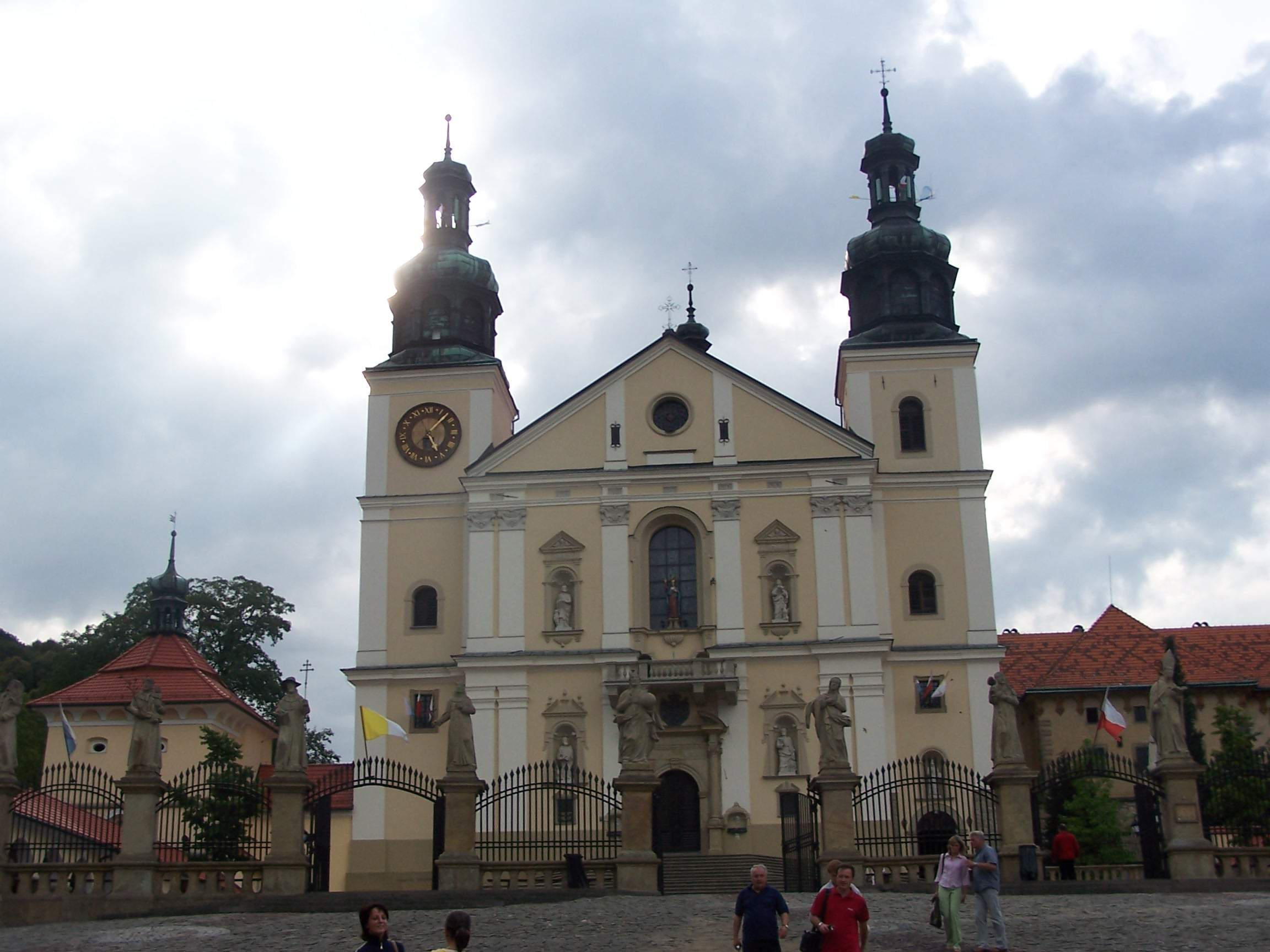
Basilica of St. Mary, facade

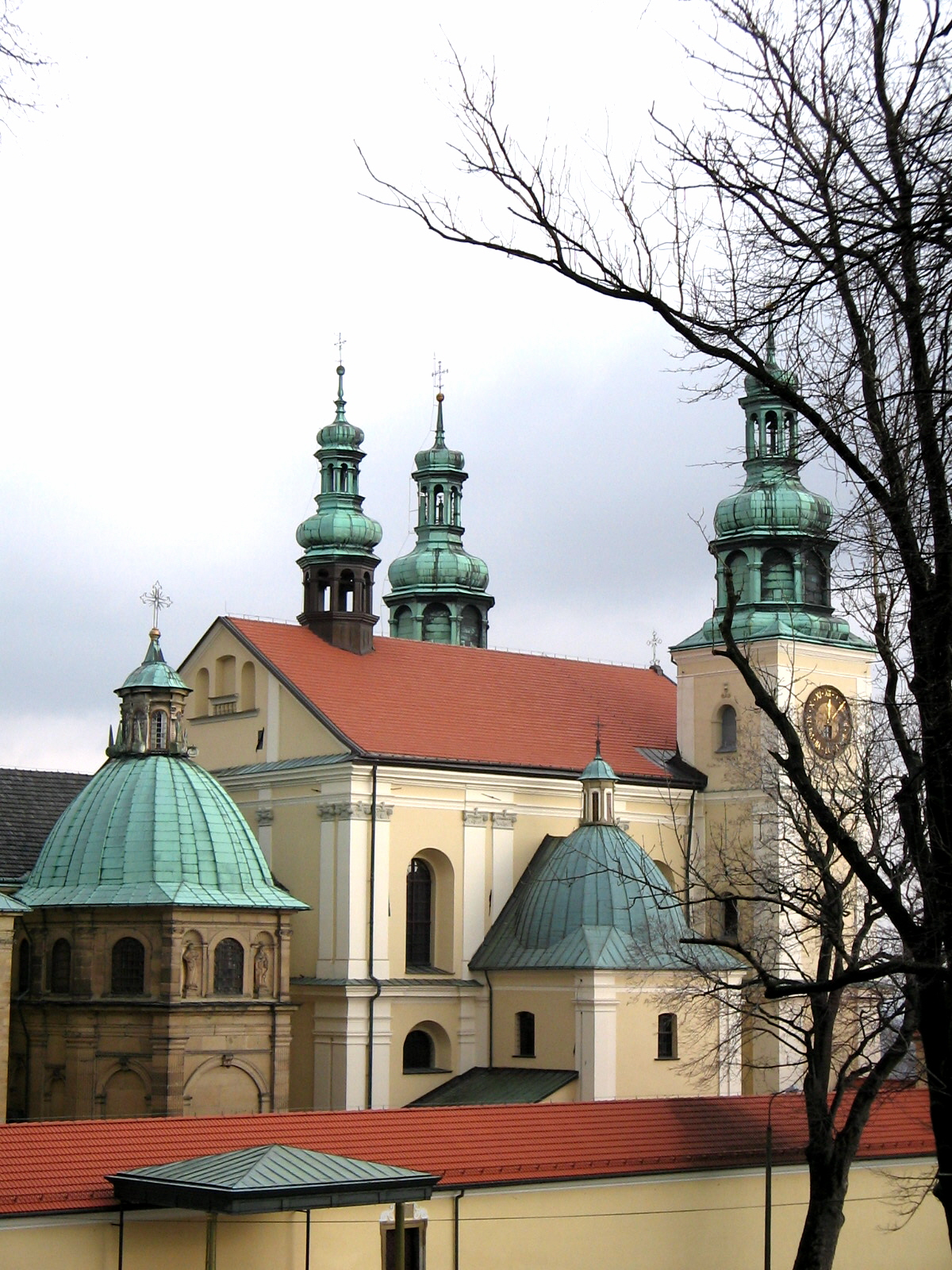
Basilica of St. Mary, rear view

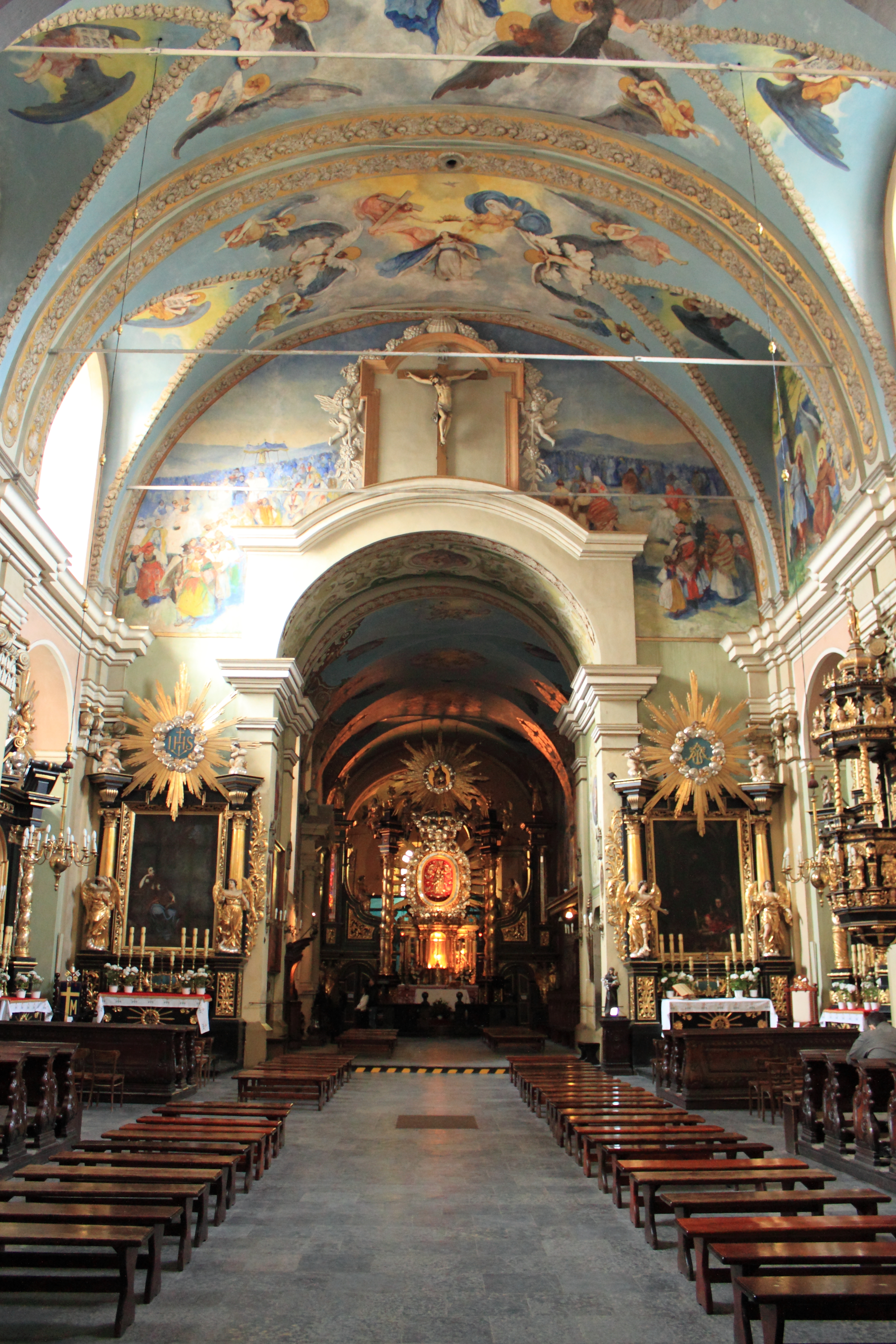
Interior of the basilica

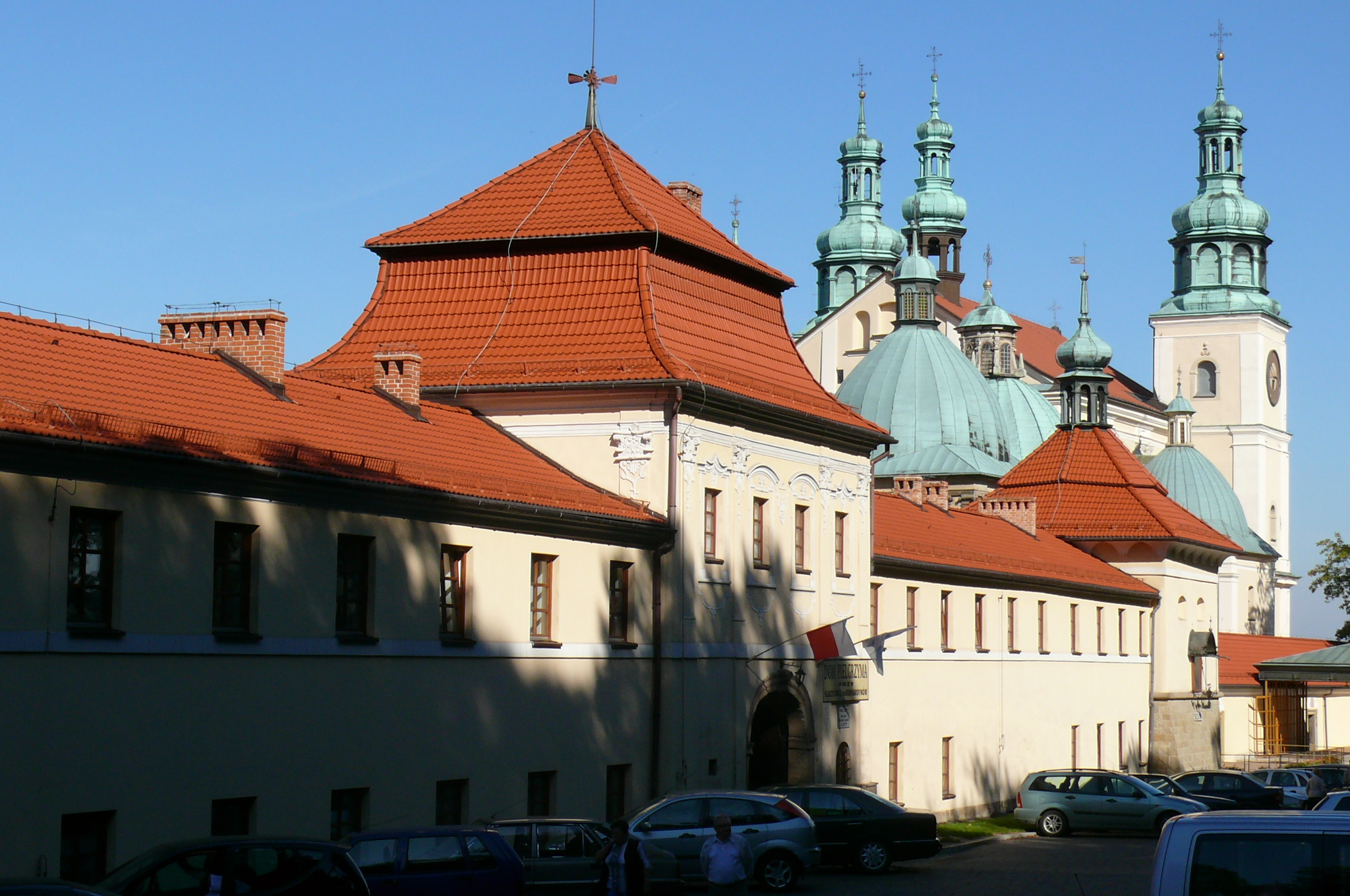
Monastery

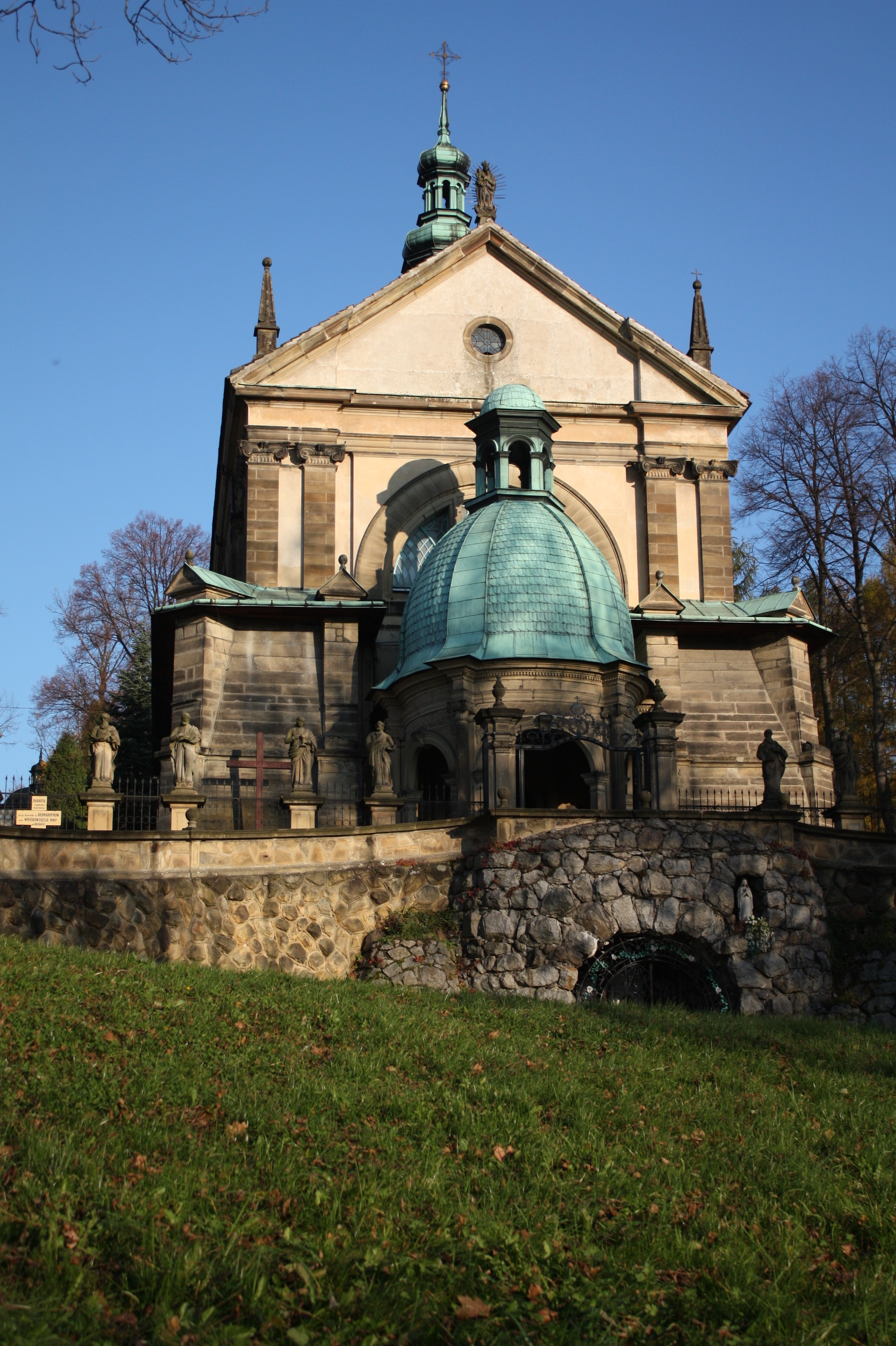
Church of the Dormition of St. Mary

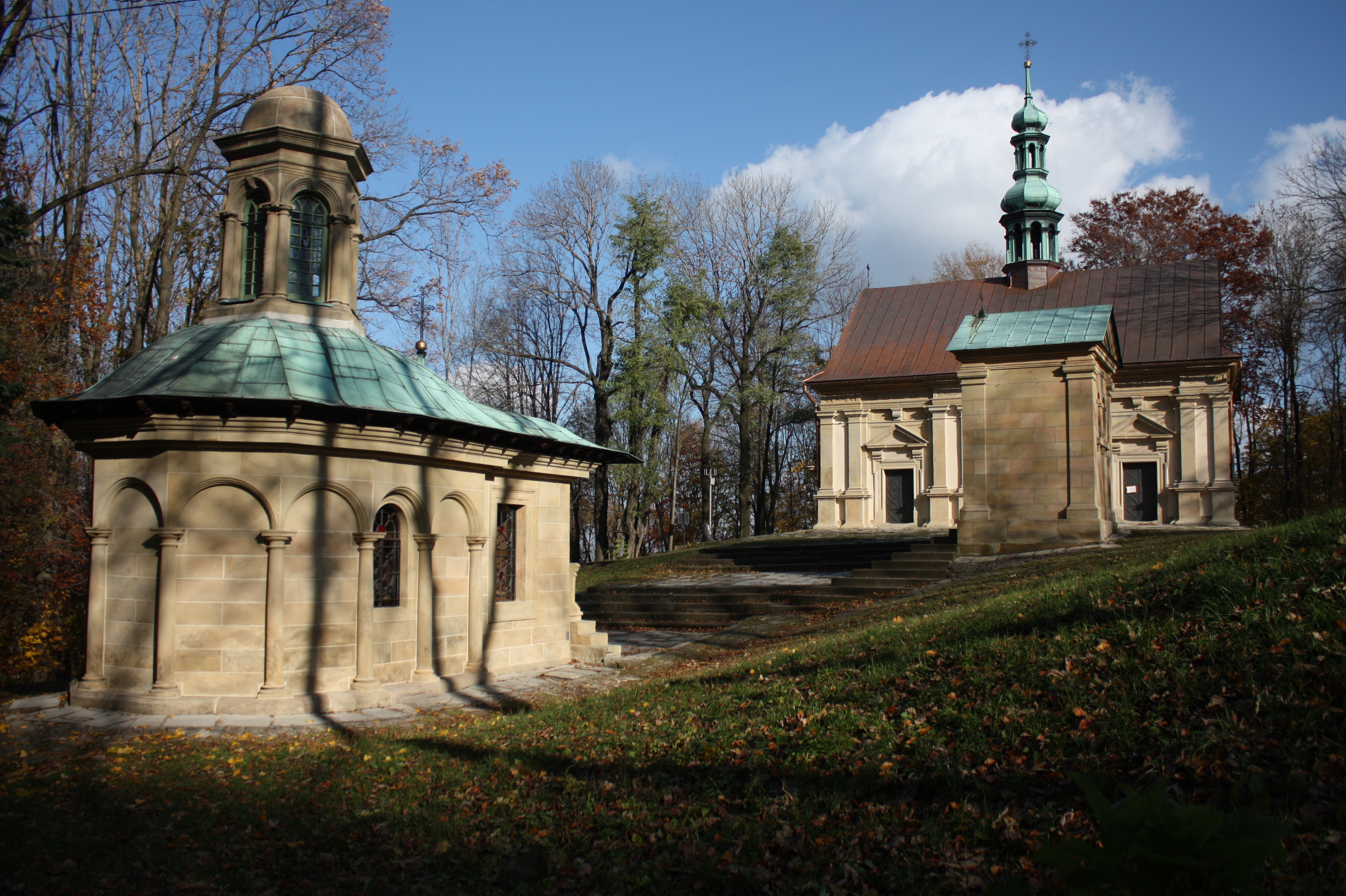
Chapels of Crucifixion, Deposition, and Entombment of Christ

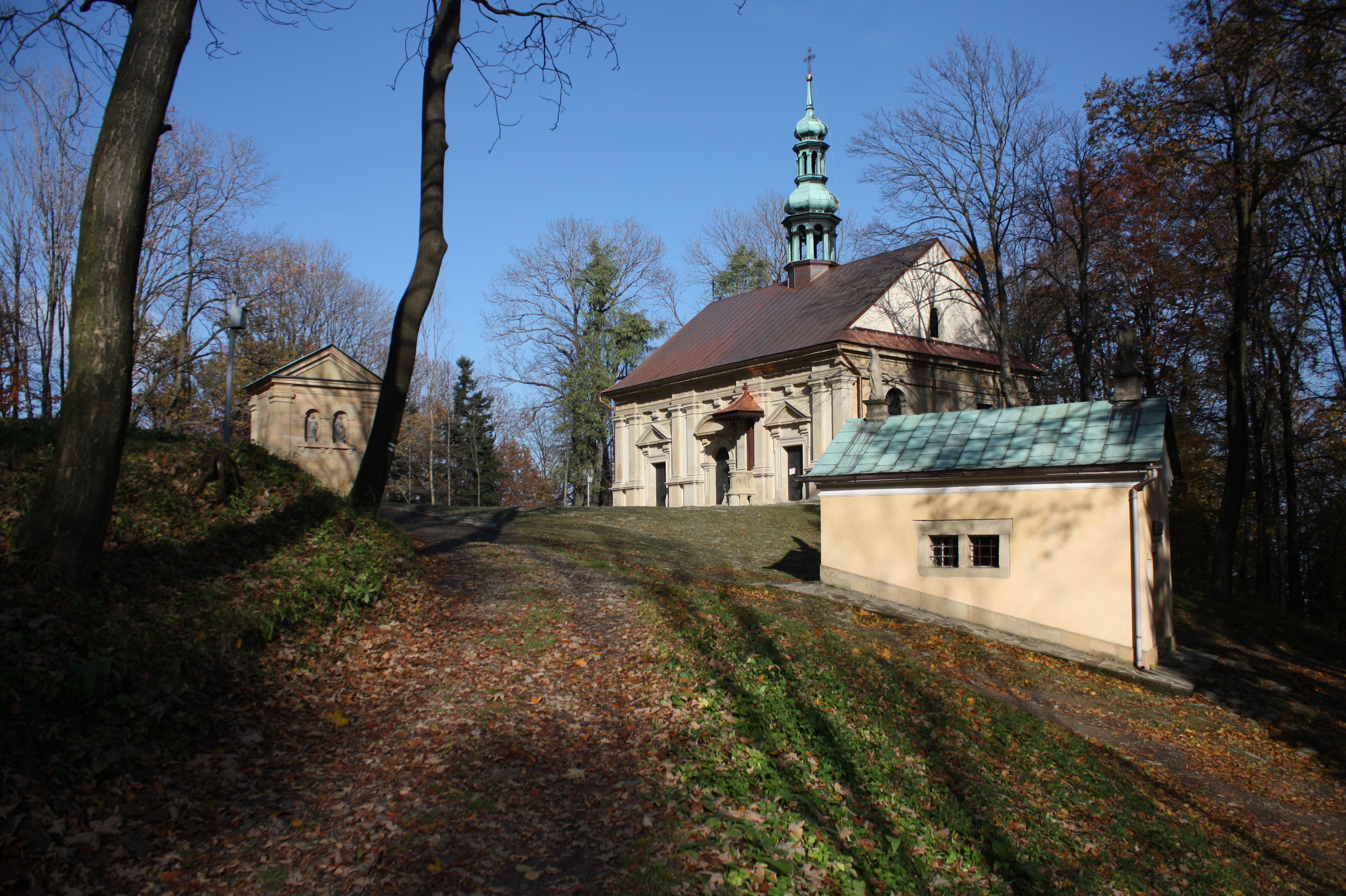
Chapels of Crucifixion and Disrobement of Christ

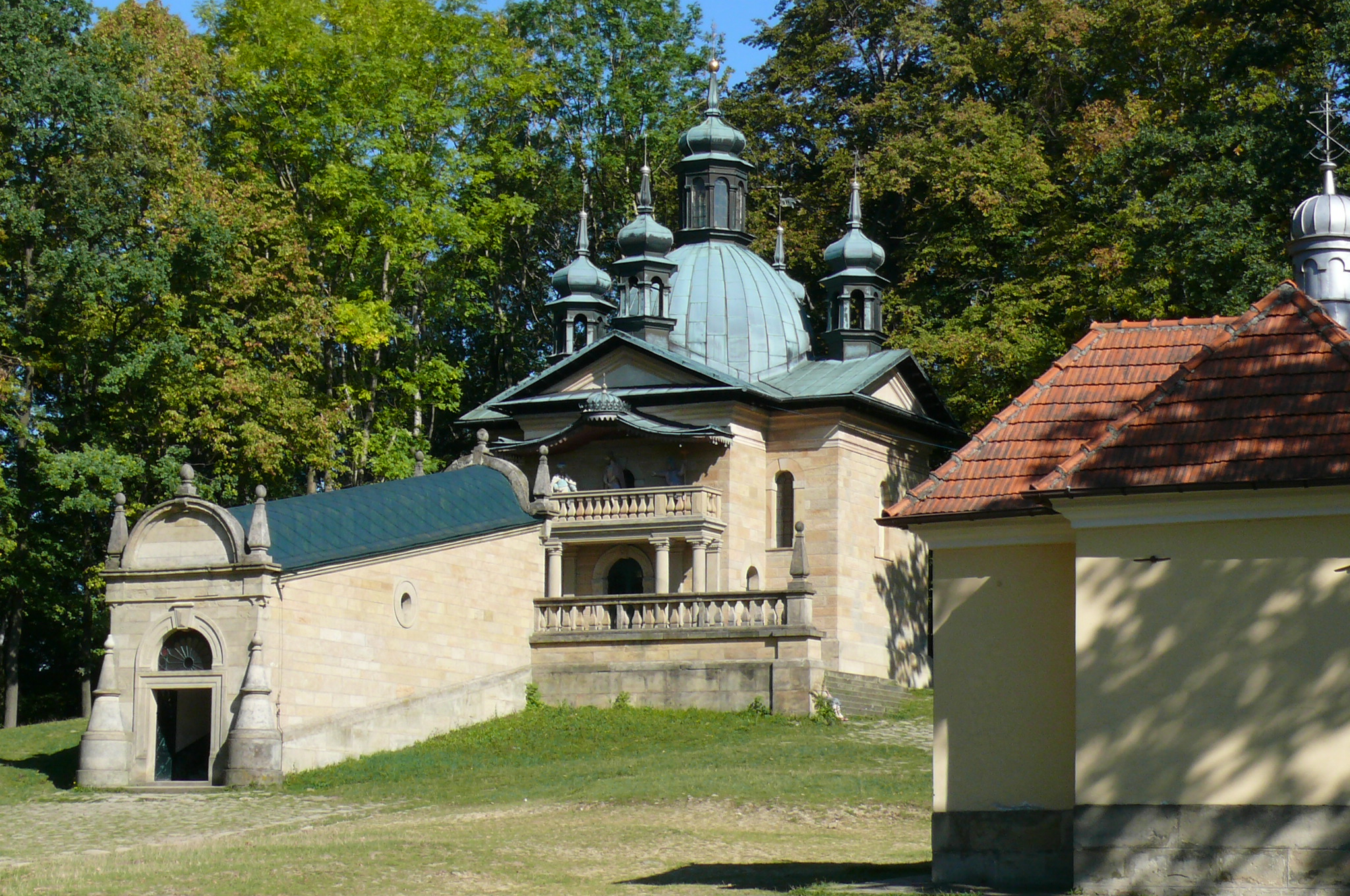
Ecce Homo Chapel

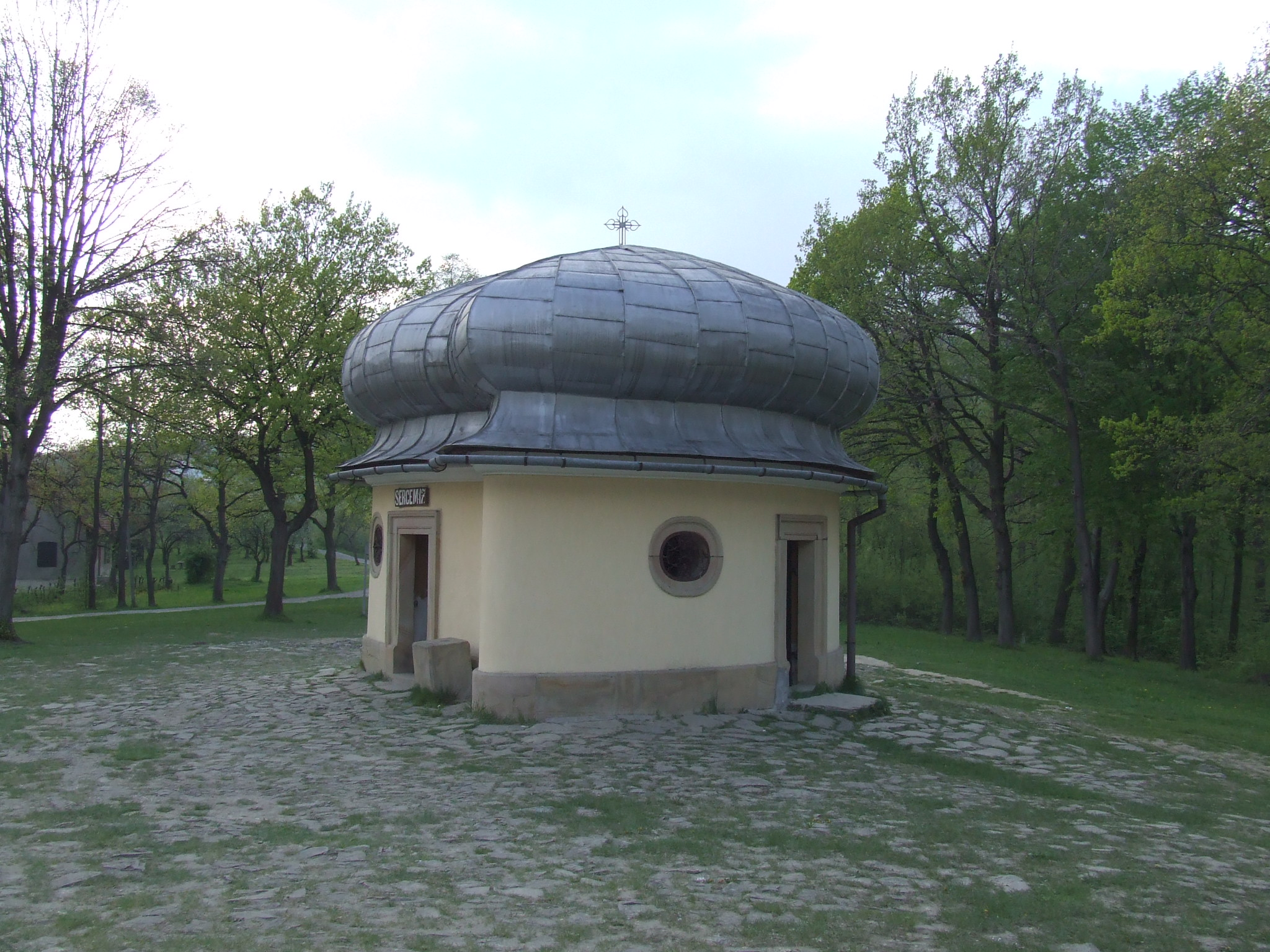
Mother's heart Chapel

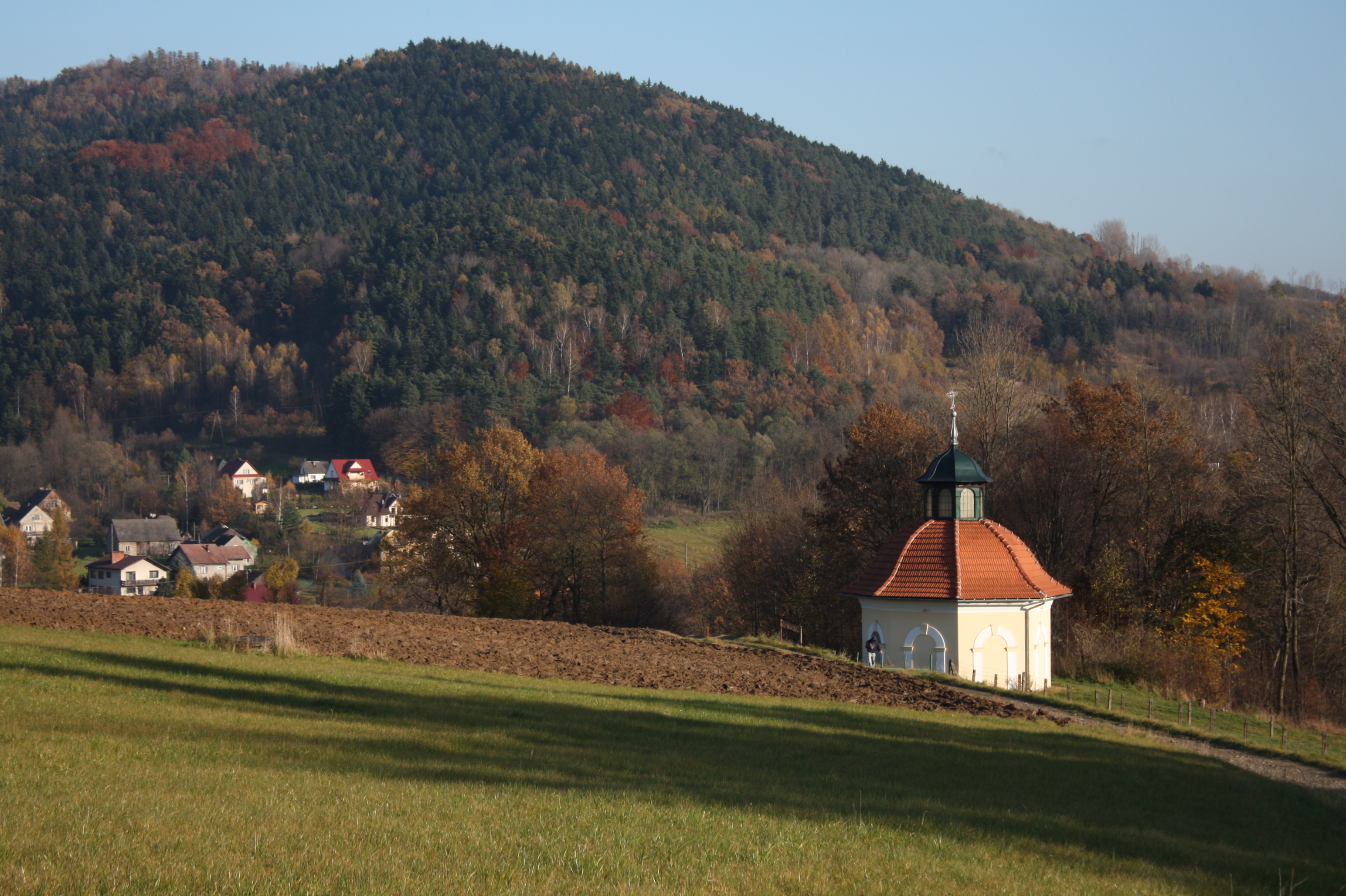
Surroundings and one of the chapels

== See also ==
- Our Lady of Calvary
- List of mannerist structures in Southern Poland
