= Staszkiewicz family =

Polish-Lithuanian noble family

Staszkiewicz family Staszkiewicze, Staškevičiai, Сташкевичі, Сташкевичи
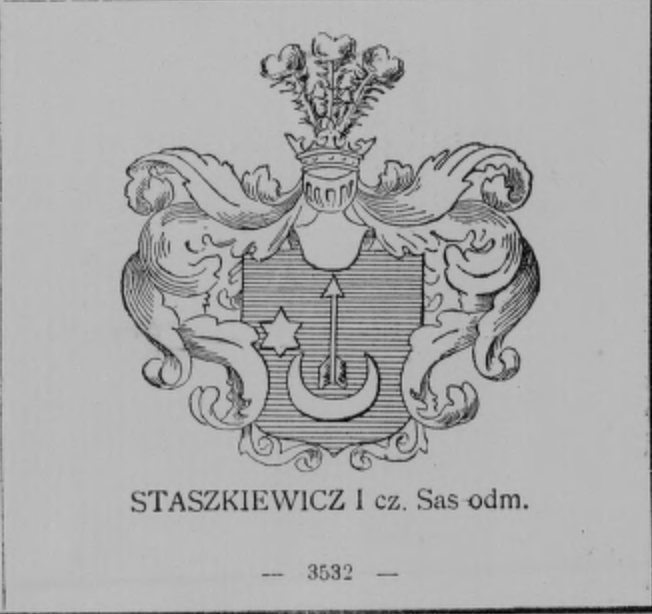
- Staszkiewicz family Coat of Arms
- Current region: Poland, Lithuania, Belarus, Ukraine
- Origin: Duchy of Samogitia

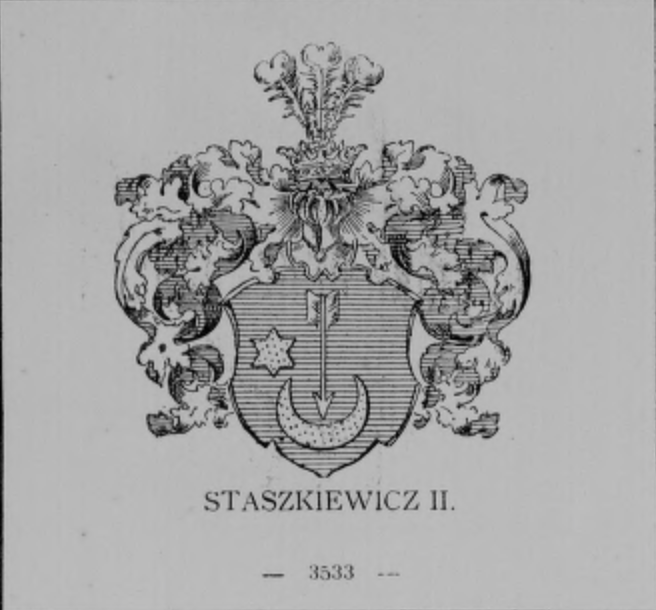
Staszkiewicz Coat of Arms, Version II, as documented in Armorial of Juliusz Ostrowski

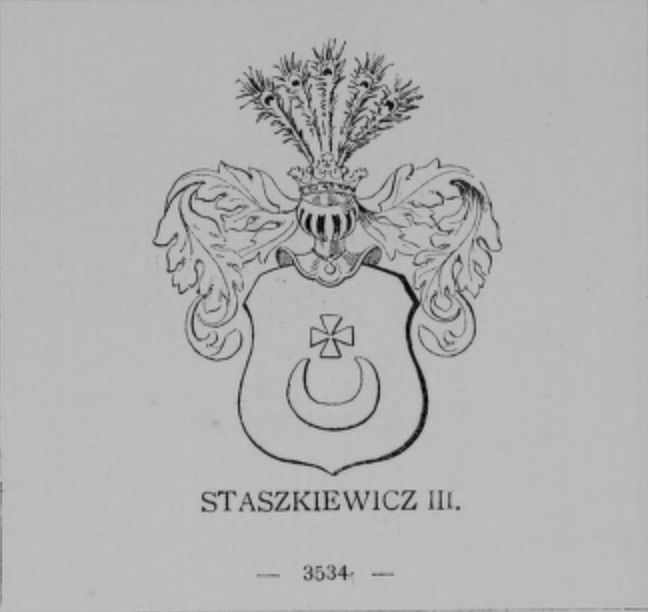
Staszkiewicz Coat of Arms, Version III, as documented in Armorial of Juliusz Ostrowski

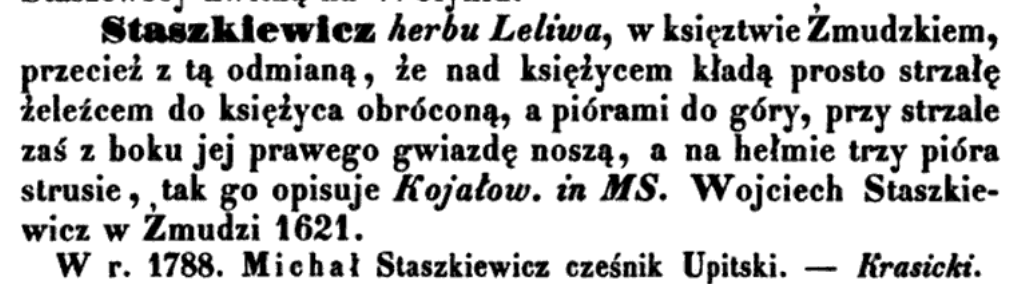
Entry for Staszkiewicz in Armorial of Kasper Niesiecki

The Staszkiewicz family (Polish pronunciation: [staʂˈkʲɛ.vʲit͡ʂ] Polish: Staszkiewicze, Lietuvių: Staškevičiai, Українська: Сташкевичі, Stashkevychs; Русский: Сташкевичи, Stashkevichs) is a Polish-Lithuanian noble family of ancient lineage originating from the Duchy of Samogitia.

The first known reference to the family is in the 1528 census of the Grand Duchy of Lithuania where they are recorded living in the voivodeships of Samogitia, Trakai, and Vilnius.

Nineteenth century documents record the family in additional territories: Vitebsk, Podolia, Kovno, Mogilev, Kiev, and Volhyn.

== Heraldry ==
Kasper Niesiecki records the Staszkiewicz family coming from the Duchy of Samogitia and states their coat of arms is a variation of Leliwa coat of arms.

Juliusz Ostrowski records the Staszkiewicz coat of arms (I & III) as variations of Sas coat of arms and also records, referencing Niesiecki, version II as a variation of Leliwa.

An 1819 confirmation of nobility records a branch of the Staszkiewicz family using the coat of arms Kroje.

== Notable Members ==
- Andrzej Staszkiewicz Podsędek of Upytė in 1615.

- Rafał Staszkiewicz Stolnik of Smolensk in 1625.

- Michał Staszkiewicz Cześnik of Upytė in 1788.

- Franciszek Staszkiewicz proboszcz of Lanckorońa and benefactor of funds for the renovation of Kalwaria Zebrzydowska.

- Stanisław Staszkiewicz Starosta Pobersztelski
