= Barbara Lubomirska =

Barbara Lubomirska is the name of:

- Barbara Lubomirska (17th century) (born 16th-century), Polish noble, fl 1611
- Barbara Lubomirska (18th century), daughter of Prince Jerzy Ignacy Lubomirski
