= Sebastian Sobieski =

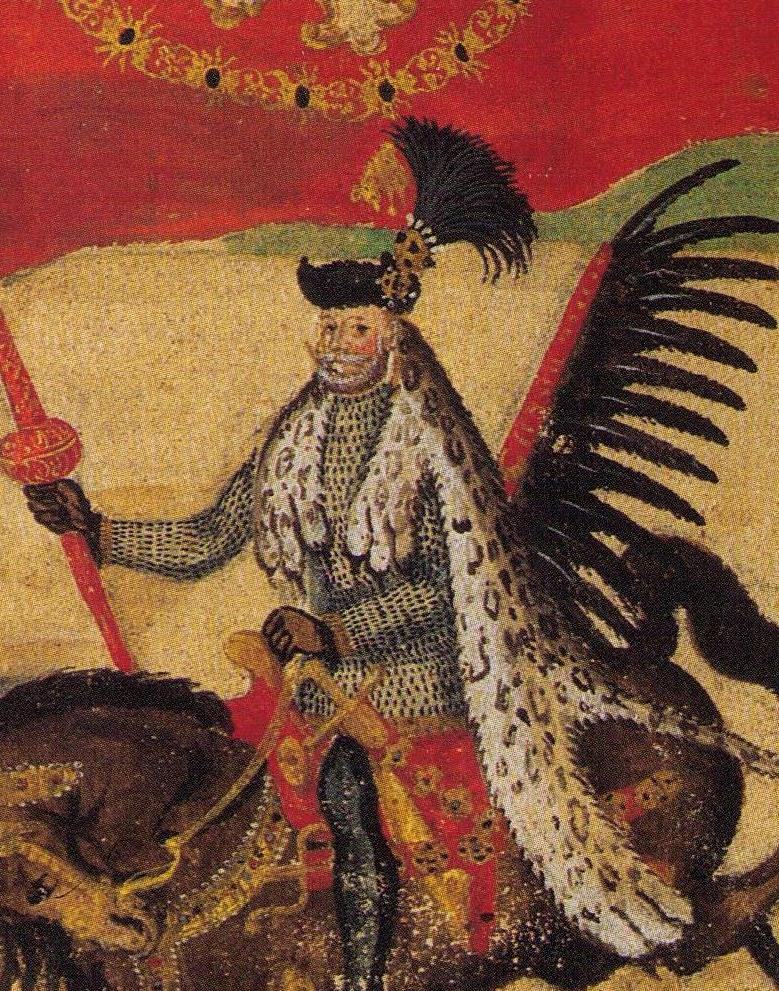
- Coat of arms: Janina
- Full name: Sebastian Sobieski z Sobieszyna h. Janina
- Born: ca. 1552
- Died: 9 October 1614
- Family: House of Sobieski
- Consort: Anna Zebrzydowska h. Radwan
- Father: Jan Sobieski h. Janina
- Mother: Katarzyna Gdeszyńska h. Gozdawa

Sebastian Sobieski (ca. 1552–1614) was a Polish szlachcic (nobleman), Court Standard-Bearer of the Crown since 1596, courtier and starost of Rosice and Bohuslav. Member of the Sejm.

Son of Jan Sobieski h. Janina and Katarzyna Gdeszyńska h. Gozdawa, brother of Voivode of Lublin Marek Sobieski.

== Marriage and issue ==
Sebastian married Anna Zebrzydowska z Więchocka h. Radwan, the daughter of Mikołaj Zebrzydowski h. Radwan and Urszula Korzbok Zawadzka h. Korzbok and had three children:

- Tomasz – died young and childless,
- Stefan – (died 1660) – jesuit,
- Zofia Konstancja – consort of starost of Mirachowo Zygmunt Szczepański h. Dołęga

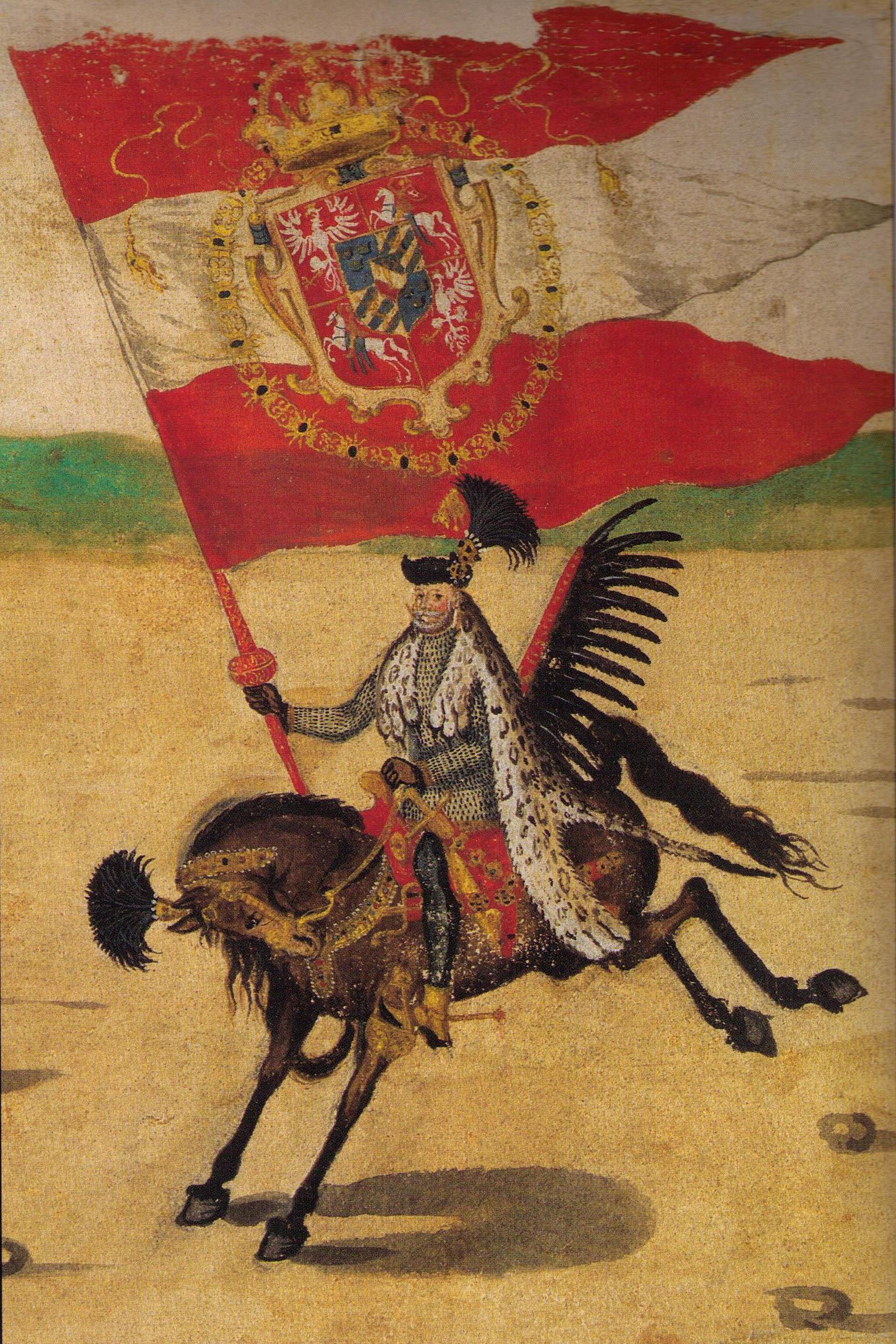
Sebastian Sobieski as the Court Standard-Bearer of the Crown

== Bibliography ==
- Korzon T., Dola i niedola Jana Sobieskiego 1629–1674, t. I, Wydawnictwo Akademii Umiejętności, Kraków 1898, tabl. VIII (Wielkopolska Biblioteka Cyfrowa 307/307).
- Nagórski W., Maroszek J., Tykocin. Miasto królewskie, AZ Media, Tykocin 2004, ISBN 83-913647-9-8, s. 77–81.
- Podhorodecki L., Sobiescy herbu Janina, Ludowa Spółdzielnia Wydawnicza, Warszawa 1981, ISBN 83-205-3234-5, s. 13.
