= Our Lady of Calvary =

17th-century painting in Poland

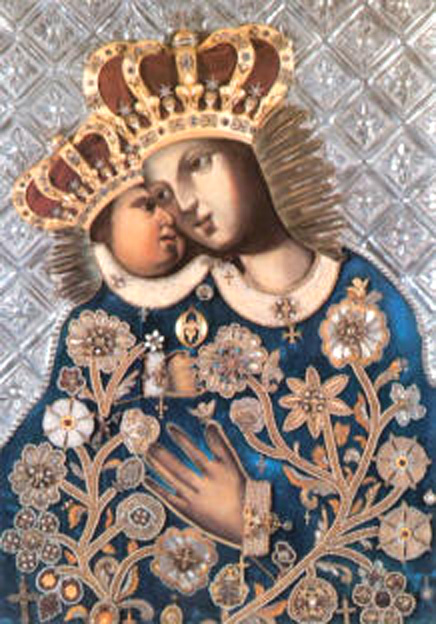
- Artist: Anonymous
- Year: before 1641
- Medium: oil on canvas
- Dimensions: 90 cm × 74 cm (35 in × 29 in)
- Location: Sanctuary of Calvary, Kalwaria Zebrzydowska

Our Lady of Calvary is a 17th-century painting situated in the shrine of Kalwaria Zebrzydowska, one of the most visited pilgrimage sites in Poland. According to legend, the painting wept in 1641. The owner presented the painting to the Bernardine monastery at Kalwaria Zebrzydowska. Veneration of the painting was authorized fifteen years later, and a chapel was commissioned to house it. The painting was canonically crowned by Pope Leo XIII on 15 August 1887.
