= Stefan Tytus Dąbrowski =

Polish scientist and politician (1877–1947)

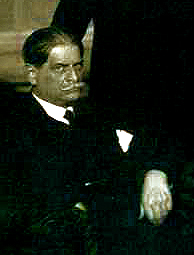
Stefan Tytus Zygmunt Dąbrowski (Żądło-Dąbrowski z Dąbrówki h. Radwan) -- from 1935 photo of Professors at Poznań University

Stefan Tytus Zygmunt Dąbrowski (31 January 1877 – 1947) was a Polish physician, physiologist and biochemist.

== Biography ==
Dąbrowski of Radwan coat of arms was born on 31 January 1877, in Warsaw, into an intelligentsia family (Żądło-Dąbrowski z Dąbrówki h. Radwan). Dąbrowski's szlachta (noble) family was a fundamental influence on his life, which included growing up in an atmosphere of patriotism in the environs of Warsaw at the end of the nineteenth century.

In January 1919, Poland's Prime Minister and Minister of Foreign Affairs, Ignacy Jan Paderewski, made Dąbrowski Vice-Minister of Foreign Affairs.

On 11 May 1939, the Senate of Adam Mickiewicz University in Poznań chose Dąbrowski, a professor, for the position of rector; however, the explosion of war beginning with Nazi Germany's invasion of Poland on 1 September 1939, made the accession of Dąbrowski's rectorial duties impossible. Dąbrowski had foreknowledge of events in 1939, and spent the duration of the war in many localities hiding from the Gestapo, Nazi Germany's secret police. Under the Nazi's Generalplan Ost, more than 61,000 Polish activists, intelligentsia, nobles (szlachta), actors, former officers, etc. (all those deemed capable of rousing the Polish people to defense and patriotic action), were to be interned or shot. (See: Operation Tannenberg, Operation Sonderaktion Krakau, and Massacre of Lwów professors). Nazi ideology dictated the Polish elite were largely Nordic, and thus capable of dynamic leadership, therefore their liquidation or internment would deprive the Slavonic masses of Poland of any effective resistance.

== Publications ==
- Dąbrowski, Stefan (1922). Walka o rekruta polskiego pod okupacją (in Polish). Warszawa: Perzyński, Niklewicz i S-ka. OCLC 22520763. "Battle for Polish Recruits Under Occupation"
- Dąbrowski, Stefan (1925). Zagadnienie obrony narodowej w wojnie nowoczesnej: organizacja rządu i naczelnego dowództwa (in Polish). Poznań: Wielkopolska Księgarnia Nakładowa Karola Rzepeckiego. OCLC 69304607. "The Issue of National Defense in Modern War: Organization of Government and the Supreme Command"
