= Mikołaj Zebrzydowski =

Military leader in Poland (1553–1620)

Crown Marshal Mikołaj Zebrzydowski
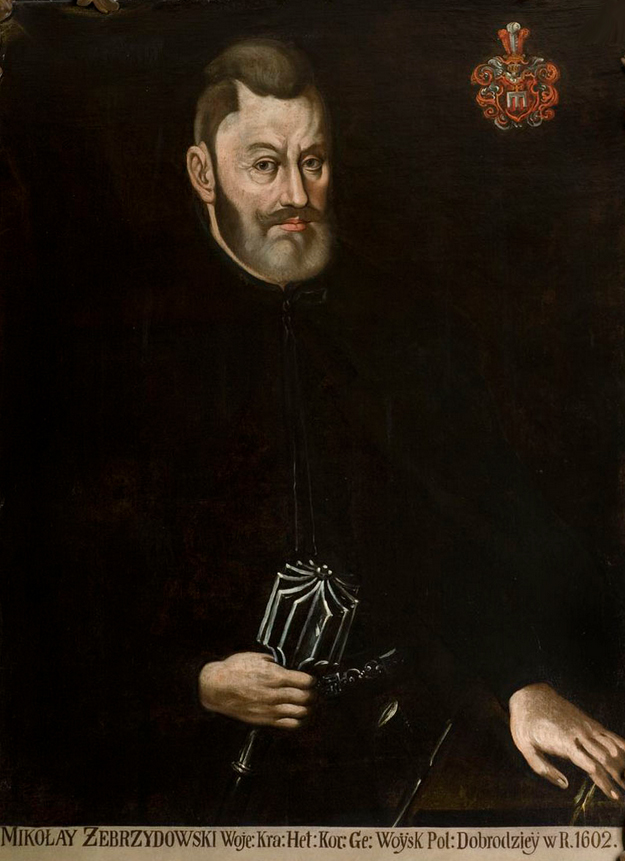
- Coat of arms: Radwan coat of arms
- Born: 1553; Kraków, Kingdom of Poland
- Died: 17 June 1620 (aged 66–67); Polish–Lithuanian Commonwealth
- Noble family: House of Zebrzydowski

Mikołaj Zebrzydowski (1553–1620) of Radwan coat of arms, voivode of Lublin from 1589, Crown Grand Marshal between 1596–1600, voivode of Kraków from 1601. He is famous for an armed rebellion against King Sigismund III Vasa, the Zebrzydowski Rebellion, a rokosz named after himself. It took place in 1606, and was defeated by 1607. After the failed rebellion, he sponsored the creation of the Roman Catholic monastery of Kalwaria Zebrzydowska, which is regarded as one of the most important pilgrimage sites of Poland.

Mikołaj Zebrzydowski is one of the personas on the famous painting by Jan Matejko: Skarga's Sermon.

== Biography ==
=== Early life ===
Zebrzydowski was born in 1553 in Kraków, into a family which became powerful and influential in the second half of the 16th century. His grandfather Jan Zebrzydowski (died probably 1538) was a royal rotmistrz. His father Florian, who died in 1566, was a castellan of Oświęcim and Lublin, and a court hetman. Florian Zebrzydowski authored a book on military discipline, titled Poruczenie wojenne. Mikołaj's mother, Zofia (née Dzik), came from a petty szlachta family. Mikołaj was their only known child. From 1565 to 1569 he attended a jesuit collegium at Braniewo. He took part in wars of Stefan Batory against Gdańsk (1577), and against the Tsardom of Russia. In the Livonian campaign of Stephen Báthory, Mikołaj Zebrzydowski was the rittmeister of a 150-strong hussar regiment. He fought in several battles in that conflict, after which in 1582 returned to Poland. Probably due to protection of Jan Zamoyski, he was nominated the starosta of Stężyca, and in 1585, was named the starosta of Kraków. In 1583 he married Zofia (née Herburt), with whom he had two children, son Jan Zebrzydowski (husband of Barbara Lubomirska), and daughter Zofia. His wife died in 1610.

=== Politics ===
During the 1587 free royal election, he supported Sigismund Vasa, and financially supported Vasa's faction in the War of the Polish Succession (1587–88). After the conflict, he was named Voivode of Lublin and court hetman. In 1595, Zebrzydowski participated in Jan Zamoyski's raid to Moldova, and in 1601, was promoted to the title of Voivode of Kraków. In ca. 1605, he became dissatisfied with King Zygmunt's attempts to strengthen royal power and weaken the nobility. The King tried to reform the administration and the treasury, also to create a permanent army. Zebrzydowski opposed it, as in his opinion, royal plans were a threat to the so-called Golden Liberty.

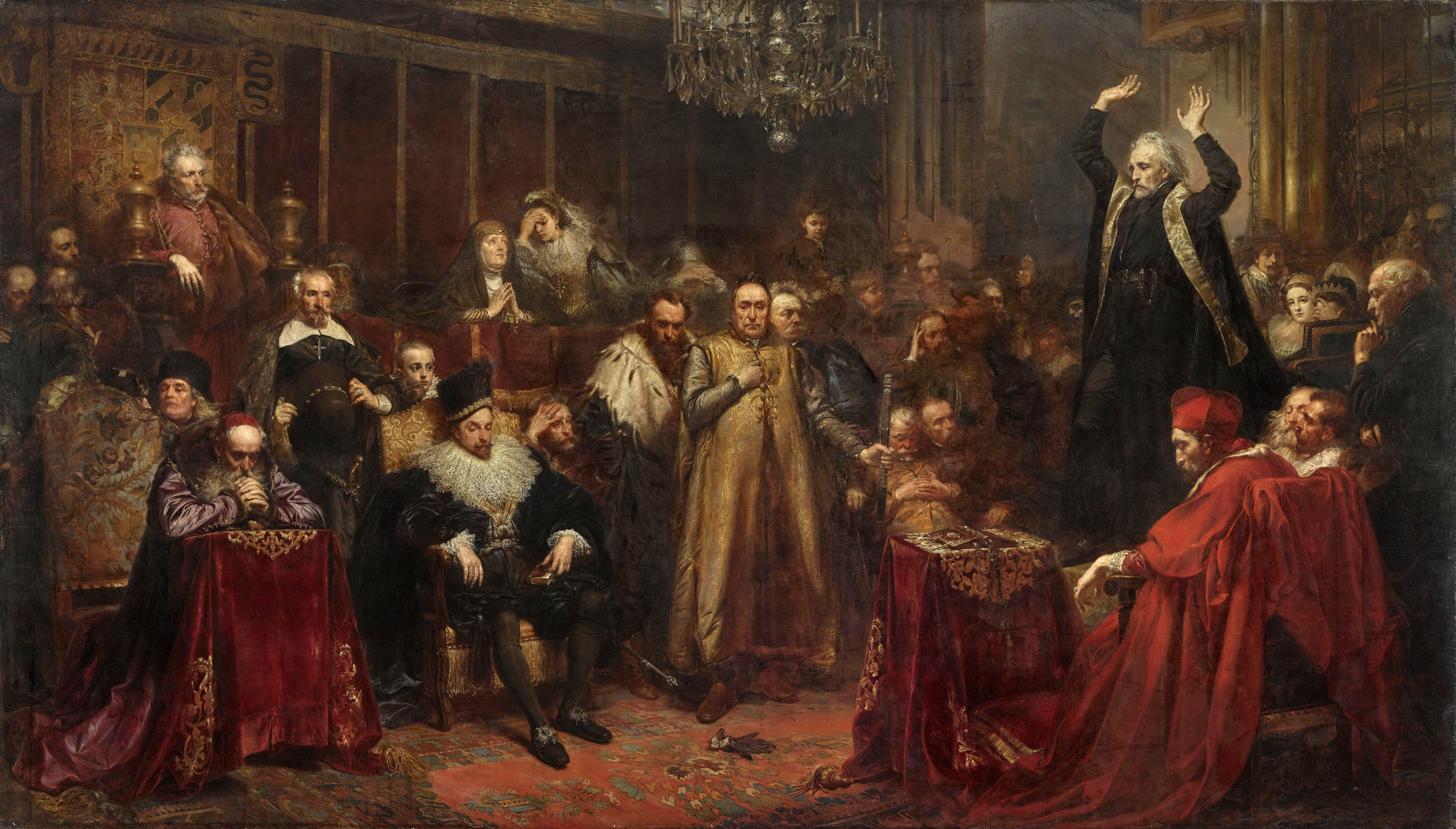
"Skarga's Sermon" by Jan Matejko. Zebrzydowski is standing in the center, left to the man in the golden robe.

=== Rebellion ===
An opposition to the king have led to a rokosz during 1606-1608, with Zebrzydowski among its leaders.

Zebrzydowski first voiced his opposition during a Kraków Voivodeship sejmik in Proszowice (16 February 1606). He stated that in order to restrain the King and control the Sejm, the nobility had to gather near Warsaw, adding that the homeland was in danger. His speech was warmly welcomed, and on 23 February, the sejmik of Lesser Poland, which took place in Nowy Korczyn, rejected royal plans, urging the Polish–Lithuanian nobility to concentrate at Stężyca, on 9 April.

Since the rebellious nobility, gathered at Stężyca, had no idea how to fight the King, another meeting was called in Lublin, on 5 June. There, the nobility called a meeting at Sandomierz (6 August), while royal supporters gathered in nearby Wiślica. Both camps wrote lists of their demands, called the Wiślica Bills and the Sandomierz Bills. After King's rejection of the Sandomierz Bills, the rebels called for a pospolite ruszenie, and the two camps faced each other at Janowiec, where leaders of the rebellion, Mikołaj Zebrzydowski and Janusz Radziwiłł, apologized to the King (8 October 1606).

The rebellion, however, did not end, as news of it reached Greater Poland. On 14 February 1607, local nobility gathered at a sejmik in Koło urged their Lesser Polish brethren to complete the rebellion, and to meet on 28 March in Jędrzejów. By that time, however, the rokosz lost its momentum, and the rebel camp was first moved to Wąchock, then to Sieciechów, and finally to Czersk. On 24 June 1607, near Jeziorna (pl), the rebels renounced their allegiance to the King. On 5 July 1607 they were defeated in the Battle of Guzów, which ended the rokosz. Zebrzydowski himself made his peace with the King on 24 August 1608 in Kraków.

=== Final years ===
After the rebellion, Zebrzydowski continued to participate in political life of Poland. He did not fight in the Polish–Muscovite War (1605–18), instead sending a few hundred of soldiers to guard the Transilvanian border against the possible invasion of Gabriel Bathory. He also appeared at the Sejms in 1613 and 1615, publicly supporting the King. After his death in 1620, he was buried in a Benedictine habit.

== See also ==
- Lublin Voivode
