= Stankevičius =

- Lithuanian surname
- m.: Stankevičius
- f.: (unmarried): Stankevičiūtė
- f.: (married): Stankevičienė

Stankevičius is a Lithuanian-language surname, the Lithuanized version of Polish surname Stankiewicz. Notable people with this surname include:

- Marius Stankevičius (born 1981), professional footballer
- Rimantas Stankevičius (1944–1990), test pilot and cosmonaut
- Laurynas Stankevičius (1935–2017), Prime Minister of Lithuania
- Česlovas Stankevičius (born 1937), politician
- Simonas Stankevičius (born 1995), professional footballer

== See also ==
- Staškevičius
