= Staškevičius =

- Lithuanian surname
- m.: Staškevičius
- f.: (unmarried): Staškevičiūtė
- f.: (married): Staškevičienė

Staškevičius is a Lithuanian-language surname, the Lithuanized version of Polish noble surname Staszkiewicz. Notable people with this surname include:

- Ignas Staškevičius, Lithuanian businessman and author
- Gintaras Staškevičius, Lithuanian modern penthatlete
- Zofija Staškevičienė, a Lithuanian Righteous Among the Nations

== See also ==
- Stankevičius
