= Samuel Osiński =

Samuel Osiński (died 1649) of Radwan coat of arms was a high-ranking noble (szlachcic) in the Polish–Lithuanian Commonwealth.

== Biography ==
Osiński was born to the courtier Pawła, a devout Calvinist.

Around 1633, he became the high commander of King Władysław IV Waza. In 1641, he became the owner of royal lands in Brest. The next year, he accompanied the king on his journey to Lithuania, and in 1645 became oboźny of the Lithuanian Army.
