= Stankiewicz =

Stankiewicz, Stankevich, or Stankievič, Stakwitz (Brazil), is a Polish and Belarusian surname. It appears in various forms depending on the language.

Language	Masculine	Feminine
Polish	Stankiewicz ([stanˈkjɛvit͡ʂ])	Same
Lithuanian	Stankevičius	Stankevičienė (married); Stankevičiūtė (unmarried)
Belarusian (Romanization)	Станкевіч; Stankievič, Stankievich	Same
Russian (Romanization)	Станкевич; Stankevich, Stankevitch	Same
Ukrainian (Romanization)	Станкевич; Stankevych	Same

Notable people with this surname include:

== Religion ==
- Adam Stankievič (1882–1949), Belarusian Roman Catholic priest, politician and writer
- Antoni Stankiewicz (born 1935–2021), Polish Roman Catholic bishop
- Aristarchus (Stankevich) (1941–2012), Belarusian Orthodox bishop
- Zbigņevs Stankevičs (born 1955), Latvian Roman Catholic archbishop

== Sports ==
- Andy Stankiewicz (born 1964), American retired Major League Baseball player
- Aneta Stankiewicz (born 1995), Polish sports shooter
- Brian Stankiewicz (born 1956), Austrian Olympic ice hockey player
- Eddie Stanky born Stankiewicz (1915–1999), American baseball second baseman and manager
- Ed Stankiewicz (1929–2019), Canadian retired professional ice hockey player
- John Stankevitch (born 1979), English rugby league coach and former player
- Myron Stankiewicz (born 1935), Canadian retired professional ice hockey player
- Teddy Stankiewicz (born 1993), American baseball pitcher
- Tomasz Stankiewicz (1902–1940), Polish track cyclist

== Other ==
- Brian Levin-Stankevich, American college administrator
- Edward Stankiewicz (1920–2013), Poland born Slavic Languages and Literatures professor at Yale University
- Irena Stankiewicz (born 1925), Polish graphic artist
- Jan Stankievič (1891–1976), Belarusian-American linguist, historian and philosopher
- Kasia Stankiewicz (born 1977), Polish pop singer
- Mamert Stankiewicz (1889–1939), Polish naval officer
- Nikolai Stankevich (1813–1840), Russian philosopher and poet
- Richard Stankiewicz (1922–1983), American sculptor
- Rob Stankiewicz, American heavy metal band Haji's Kitchen drums player
- Sylwester Stankiewicz (1866–1919), Polish Imperial Russian corps commander
- Yury Stankevich (born 1976), Russian politician
