= Kalwaria Zebrzydowska =

Town in southern Poland

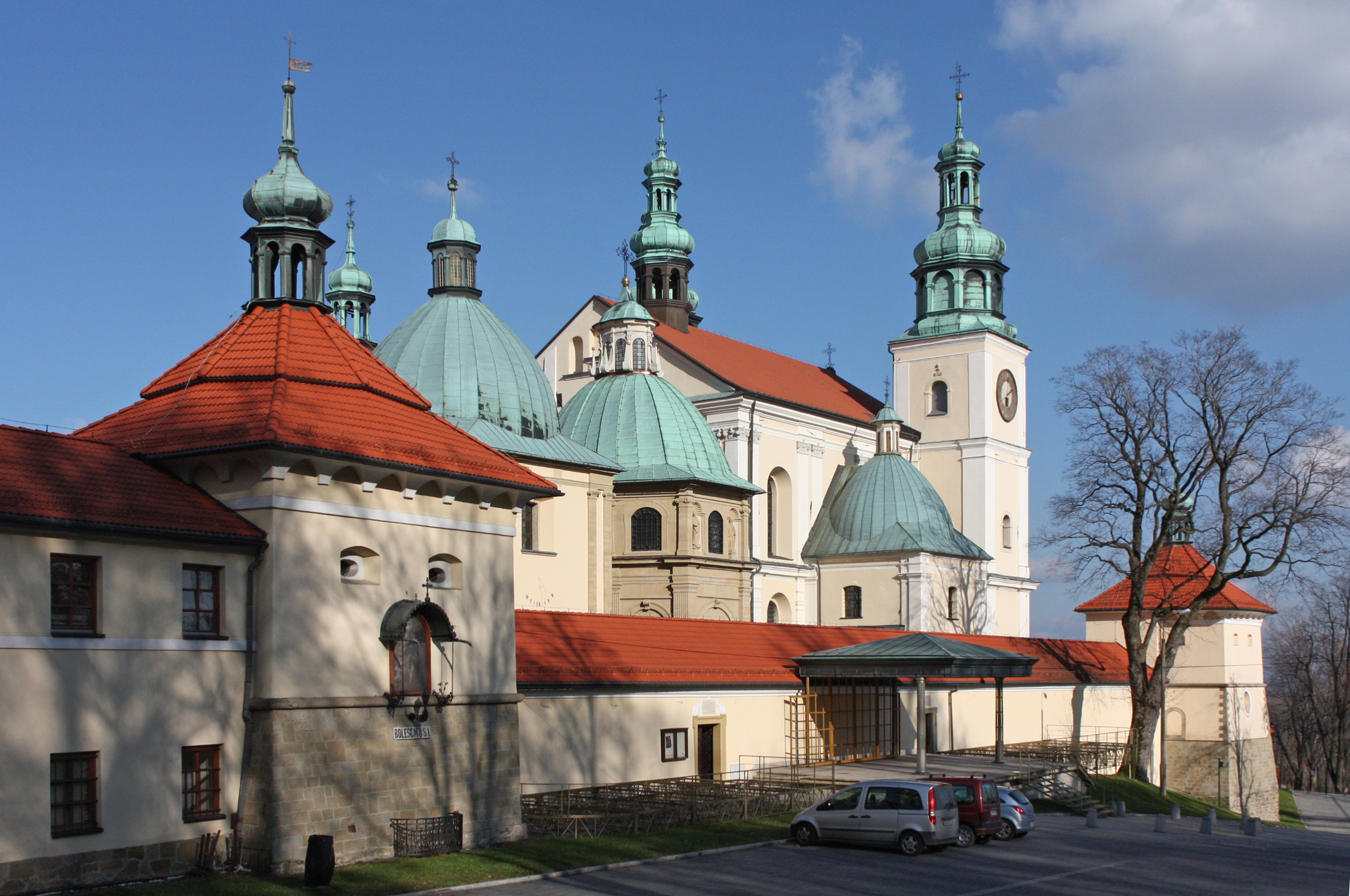
- Monastery in Kalwaria Zebrzydowska, a UNESCO World Heritage Site

- Coat of arms

- Location within Poland
- Coordinates: 49°52′N 19°41′E
- Country: Poland
- Voivodeship: Lesser Poland
- County: Wadowice
- Gmina: Kalwaria Zebrzydowska
- Established: 17th century
- Town rights: 1617

Government
  - Mayor: Tadeusz Stela (Ind.)

Area
  - Total: 5.5 km^{2} (2.1 sq mi)

Population (2006)
  - Total: 4,503
  - Density: 820/km^{2} (2,100/sq mi)
- Time zone: UTC+1 (CET)
  - Summer (DST): UTC+2 (CEST)
- Postal code: 34-130
- Area code: +48 33
- Car plates: KWA
- Website: www.kalwaria-zebrzydowska.pl

Kalwaria Zebrzydowska (Polish pronunciation: [kalˈvarja zɛbʐɨˈdɔfska]) is a town in southern Poland with 4,429 inhabitants (2007 estimate). As of 1999, it is situated in Lesser Poland or Małopolska (in Polish). Previously, the town was administered within the Voivodeship of Bielsko-Biała (1975–1998).

== Overview ==
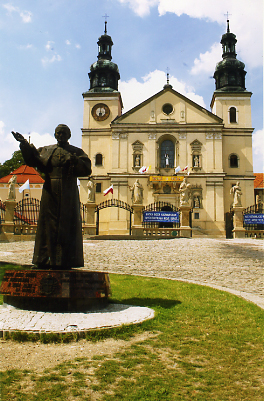
Monastery

With a vision while viewing the neighbouring hills and valleys from the Castle of Lanckorona, on 1 December 1602, Mikołaj Zebrzydowski, the Voivode of Kraków commissioned the construction of a calvary, i.e. Roman Catholic monastery and the trails of the Passion of Christ modeled on the Calvary outside the city walls of Jerusalem.

The town takes its name from the monastery that was constructed on the hills neighbouring Lanckorona and the last name of its founder Zebrzydowski. The town of Zebrzydów was established in 1617 in order to house the growing number of pilgrims visiting the Roman Catholic site of worship. The town rights were expanded and the town remapped by Jan Zebrzydowski in 1640, gaining the name Nowy Zebrzydów (New Zebrzydów). In 1715, the town suffered the effects of a large fire and was subsequently rebuilt by Józef Czartoryski, its owner. The Czartoryski family Palace was built in 1729–1731. In the 1980s, it was rebuilt and remastered into the current seminary. The Habsburg Austrian Empire annexed the town as part of its invasion of Poland during the First Partition of Poland in 1772. The Austrian administration changed the name to "Kalwaria". In 1887, Jan Kanty Brandys became the owner of the town and at around 1890 the name Kalwaria Zebrzydowska was adopted. In 1896, the town lost its town rights due to a decision by the governing Austrian authorities. The construction of St. Joseph's Church began in 1905. The town returned to Poland in 1919 with the end of World War I and the signing of the Treaty of Versailles by Roman Dmowski on behalf of the Polish Republic on 28 June 1919 in Paris. The town rights were restored in 1934 by a decision of the Polish government.

After World War II, the town's economic development largely relied on the expansion of its furniture manufacturing and woodcraft industry, shoemaking, as well as a growing number of pilgrims to its religious complex.

Pope John Paul II made several visits to Kalwaria Zebrzydowska on the pilgrimages he made to his homeland Poland. It was at the monastery of Kalwaria Zebrzydowska that Pope John Paul II repeated the words of his motto:

"Totus tuus ego sum, et omnia mea tua sunt. Accipio te in mea omnia. Praebe mihi cor tuum, Maria." ("I belong entirely to you, and all that I have is yours. I take you for my all. O Mary, give me your heart").

According to his Apostolic Letter Rosarium Virginis Mariae he borrowed the motto from the Marian consecrating prayer found in the book True Devotion to Mary by Saint Louis de Montfort.

Pope John Paul II once recalled how as a young seminarian he "read and reread many times and with great spiritual profit" some writings of Saint Louis de Montfort and that:

"Then I understood that I could not exclude the Lord's Mother from my life without neglecting the will of God-Trinity"

In 1987, Henryk Górecki composed a choral piece (Totus Tuus Op. 60) to celebrate Pope John Paul II's third pilgrimage to his native Poland that summer. While the motet opens with the same words as the apostolic motto, the piece actually uses a poem by Maria Boguslawska for its text.

== International relations ==
=== Twin towns — sister cities ===
Kalwaria Zebrzydowska is twinned with:

- Kalvarija in Lithuania
- Hamelin in Germany
- Bisceglie in Italy

== See also ==
- Our Lady of Calvary
- Radwan coat of arms
- Kalwaria Zebrzydowska Lanckorona (PKP station)
