= Andrzej Zebrzydowski =

Polish Roman Catholic bishop

- Kamieniec Podolski, Chełm, Włocławek, Kraków
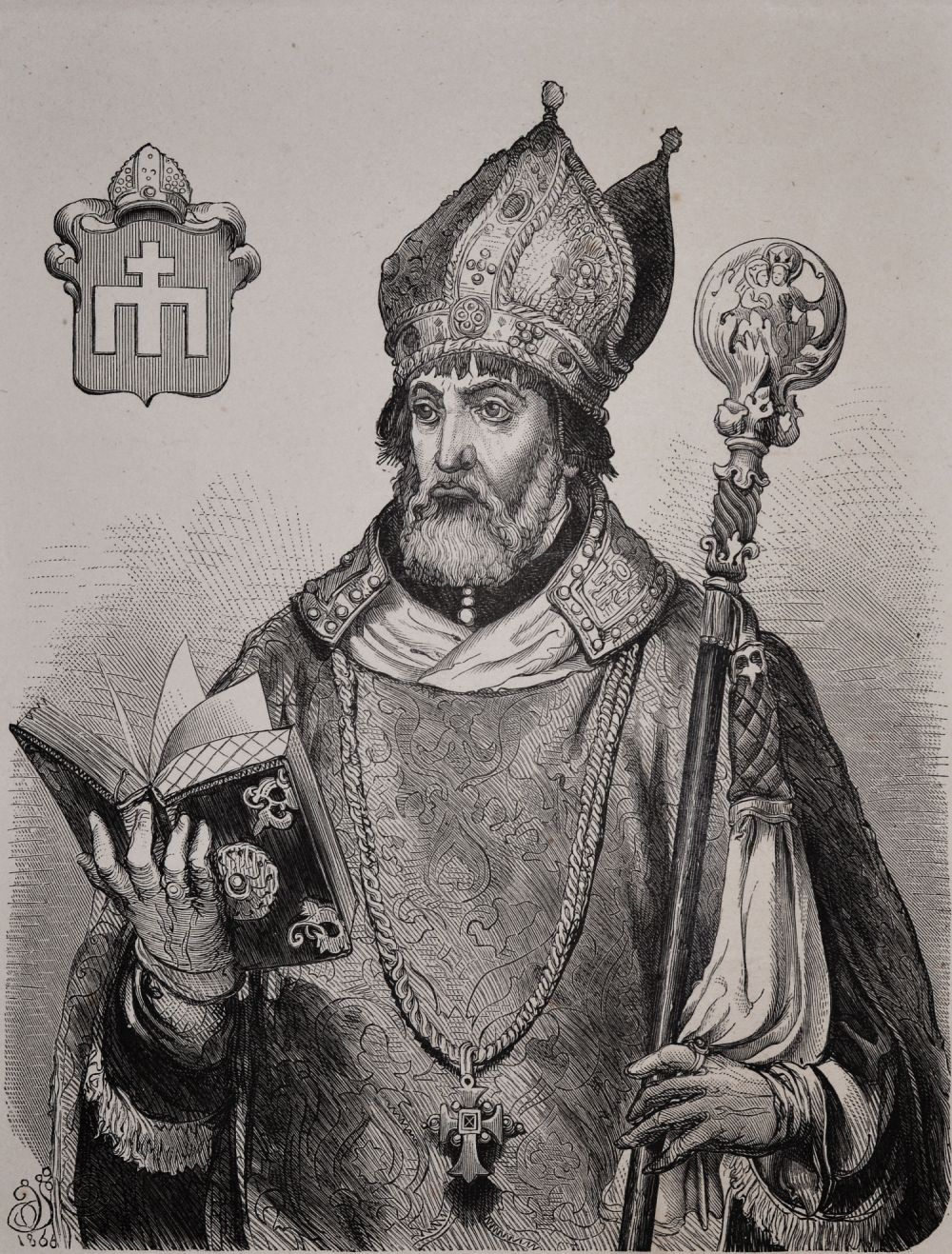
- Installed: 1543

Personal details
- Born: 1496 Więcbork, Poland
- Died: 23 May 1560 (aged 63–64) Września, Poland

Andrzej Zebrzydowski, (1496 in Więcbork – 23 May 1560 in Września), Radwan coat of arms, was a Polish Roman Catholic bishop of Kamieniec Podolski (from 1543), Chełm (from 1545), Włocławek (from 1546) and Kraków (from 25 February 1551); chaplain of Bona Sforza, then supporter of Sigismund II Augustus.

== See also ==
- List of Roman Catholic bishops of Kraków
