= Radwan coat of arms =

Polish coat of arms

Radwan
- Battle cry: Kaja, Radwan
- Alternative names: Wierzbowa, Wierzbowczyk, Wirzbowa, Wirzbowo, Kaja, Chorągwie
- Earliest mention: 1407
- Cities: Kalwaria Zebrzydowska
- Families: 294 names B Babski, Bagieński, Banowski, Baran, Barański, Batogowski, Bądzkiewicz, Beniewicz, Benkiewicz, Benkowicz, Bęcki, Białobrzeski, Bieniewski, Bienkiewicz, Bieńkiewicz, Biernacki, Bilewicz, Bocewicz, Bochowicz, Bochwic, Bochwicz, Bogucki, Boleski, Borewicz, Borodzic, Borodzicz, Bradysz, Brandys, Branecki, Braniecki, Broniewicz, Buchowicz, Buchwic, Buchwicz, Bukomowicz, Bułczyn, Byczko C Chałański, Charwiński, Chełstowski, Chlewiński, Chlugwański, Chluski, Chłusewicz, Chłuski, Chmielewski, Chwediuszko, Cikowski, Cimochowicz, Coluszański, Czapka, Czapla, Czaplejewski, Czaplica, Czcik, Czcikowski, Czyliński, Czymbajewicz D Dadzibog, Dadzibóg, Dąbrowski, Desznowski, Dębski, Długi, Dobrosielski, Dostojewski, Dudkiewicz, Draczewski, Dziewulski, Dzlistrowicz, Drozda F Fediuszko, Fiedziuszko, Filatkiewicz, Fokowicz, Folgierski, Folkierski, Folkiewicz, Frystacki, Frysztacki, Fulgierski G Gliński, Głuchowski, Gondyn, Goska, Górski, Grodziecki, Grodzki, Gubarewicz H Hanuszewicz, Hejnik, Hluszanin, Hłuski, Homiczewski, Hordyna, Hrynkiewicz, Hubarewicz, Huk, Hukiewicz J Jakacki, Janewicz, Janowicz, Januszowski, Jarzębiński, Jasklecki, Jasklewski, Jaskułowski, Jastkowski, Jastowski, Jeziorkowski, Johanson, Józefowicz, Judycki, Jurkowski K Kania, Karmański, Karski, Karwacki, Karwiński, Kawłok, Kieński, Kietorowski, Kieturowski, Kiskowski, Kissowski, Knabe, Kohałowski, Kokotek, Komar, Konaszewski, Kononowicz, Korabiewski, Kowalewski, Kowalowski, Krodzki, Krotki, Krotkiewicz, Krotkiewski, Krótki, Kryczyński, Krzymaski, Krzymuski, Krzystek, Krzyszczewski, Kubabski, Kulbacki, Kunaszewski, Kunaszowski, Kurcz, Kurzelewski, Kużelewski, Krukowski coat of arms L Laszenko, Lenkiewicz, Leszczyński, Lodziński, Lubaski, Lubański, Lubawski, Ładziński, Łodziński, Łukawski M Magnuszewski, Malchiewski, Maliński, Małchiewski, Małkiewicz, Małuszycki, Mamiński, Mazulewicz, Michałowski, Michnowicz, Miemczewski, Mioduski, Mioduszewski, Mironowicz N Nabut, Nadarzyński, Nicki, Niebrzydowski, Nieciunski, Niegoszowski, Niedziałkowski, Niemczewski, Nieszporek, Niszczyński O Obarzanowski, Obwarzanowski, Okęcki, Okęski, Okmiański, Okuszko, Oleszyński, Oleśnicki, Olszowski, Orzechowski, Oświecim, Oświecimski, Oświęcim, Owsieński, Owsiński, Oziembłowski, Oziębłowski P Pacek, Pakosławski, Pakoszewski, Parzanowski, Paskiewicz, Paszkiewicz, Paszkiewicz-Wojzbun, Paszkowski, Pawecki, Paweczki, Pawęcki, Pawędzki, Pelikant, Pełka, Pemperzyński, Pepeszyński, Petruszewski, Pęperski, Pieczątkowski, Pietraszewski, Pietruszewski, Piwkowicz, Plichciński, Plichczyński, Pławski, Płużański, Podniesiński, Pokoszczewski, Pokoszewski, Połajewski, Połukord, Porażyński, Porutowicz, Powicki, Pragłowski, Prakowski, Prokowski, Proniewicz, Przychocki, Przydkowski, Przygodzki, Przypkowski R Rachwałowski, Radecki, Radłowski, Radwan, Radniecki, Radwaniecki, Radwanowski, Radwański, Radyński, Radziszewski, Rakowski, Rodziński, Rpiński, Rupiński, Rusiecki, Rusiłowicz, Rybalski, Rybicki, Rybiński, Rypiński S Semenowicz, Serny, Serwański, Serwiński, Skarzewski, Sławkowski, Słąka, Słonka, Słuszewski, Służewski, Sucharzewski, Stanchlewski, Stanczlewicz, Stanczlewski, Stanisławski, Stech, Stecki, Stojart, Suchożebrski, Szarawski, Szemrawski, Świszczewski T Tabusiewicz, Toczyski, Tołokański, Tumalewski U Uchański, Urban, Uklański W Wiadrowski, Wierzbicki, Więcborski, Więckowicz, Wilam, Wilk, Wirski, Włodkiewicz, Wojdaliński, Wojdalski, Wojkunowski, Wojsławski, Wołągiewicz, Wołkunowski, Wołochowicz, Wołodkowicz, Woykunoski, Woysławski, Wytam Z Zabielski, Zajdlicz, Załamaj, Zebrzydowski, Zejdlicz, Zembocki, Zębocki, Zielewicz, Zięcina, Żarski, Żądło

Radwan (Polish pronunciation: [ˈradvan]) is a Polish knights' clan (ród) and a Polish coat of arms used by the noble families within the clan (szlachta).

== Blazon ==
Gules: a Gonfanon or surmounted by a Maltese Cross of the last. Crest – on a crowned helmet – three ostrich feathers proper.

Arms: gules, a gonfannon ensigned of a cross in chief, and fringed in base, all or. Issuant of a helmet ducally crowned; for a crest, three ostrich plumes proper.

== History ==
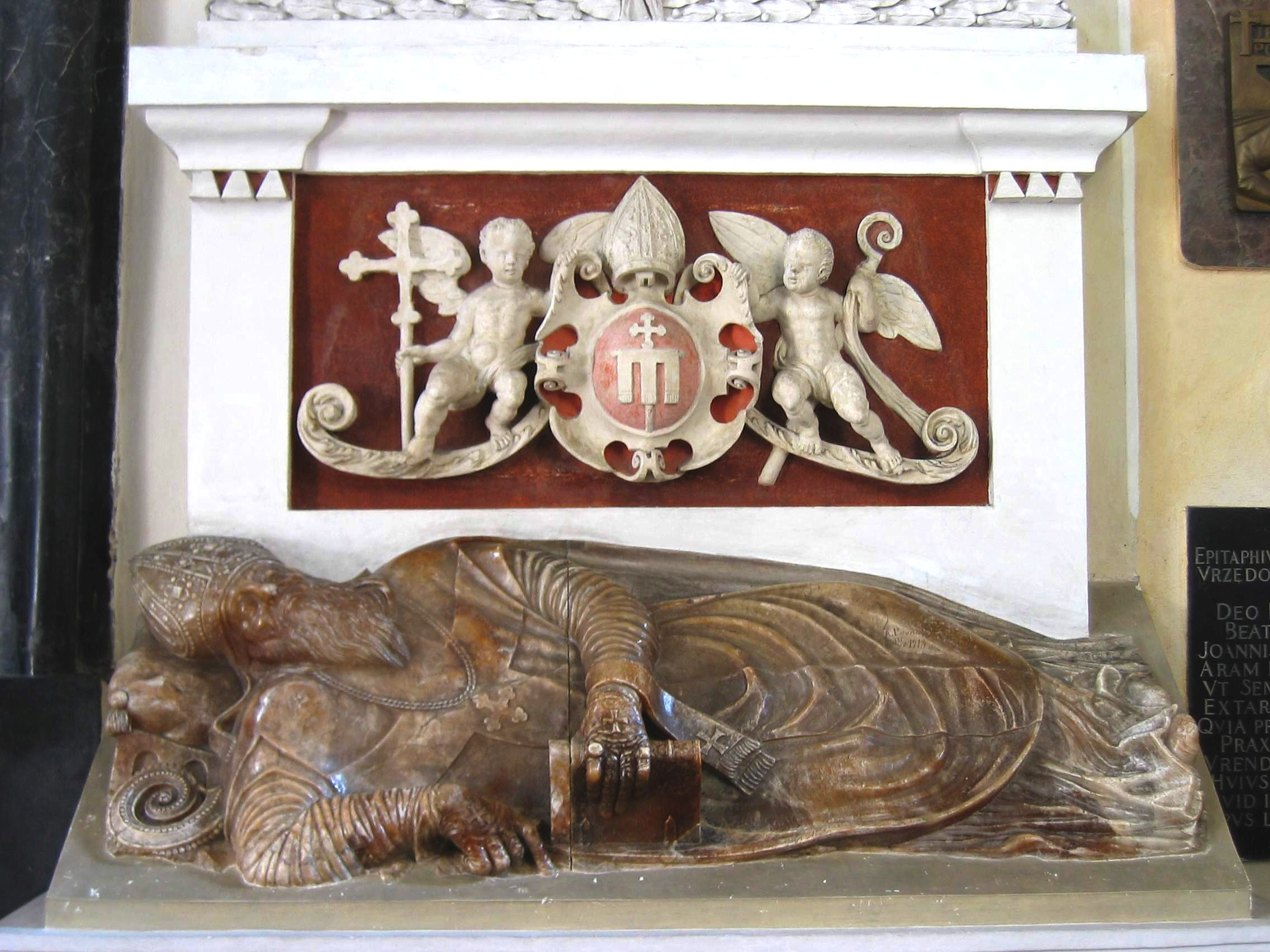
Tomb effigy of Polish primate Jakub Uchański in Łowicz cathedral 1580

Radwan is among the most ancient coats of arms. Its origin traces to Polish and German nobility.

The most ancient seal dates from 1443 and the first record from 1409. This coat of arms was widespread mainly in the regions of Kraków, Płock, Sandomierz, Sieradz, and also in Podlasie, Rawa, Ruthenia, and Lithuania. It exists in eight variants.

Families of magnate status (możni/high nobility) bearing Radwan arms were the Babski's, and the Magnuszewski's and Uchański's (See: Jakub Uchański), parts of the Mazovian feudal elite; however, many branches of the Radwans never transcended the status of middle and lesser nobility.

"In Poland, the Radwanice were noted relatively early (1274) as the descendants of Radwan, a knight [more properly a "rycerz" (German "ritter")] active a few decades earlier. ..."

Kasper Niesiecki S.J. (1682–1744) in his "Herbarz Polski" (with increased legal proofs and additions by Jan Nepomucen Bobrowicz [1805–1881] in the Leipzig editions, 1839–1846) writes:

"It [Radwan coat of arms] was awarded during the reign of King Bolesław Smialy (1058–1079) on the occasion of a battle with Ruthenia; a captain named Radwan had been sent out on a foray with part of the army. He happened upon the enemy camp in such close quarters that they could neither protect themselves from a skirmish with the Ruthenians, nor fight with them, inasmuch as their numbers were so much smaller. But they all agreed it was better to fall dead on the spot than to encourage the enemy by fleeing. So with all their heart they sprang toward the Ruthenians, whose knights were daunted by this attack; but when they saw the small numbers against them, the Ruthenians grew bold, and not only took away their banner, but dispersed them as well. Captain Radwan, wishing to encourage his men to fight once more, rushed to a nearby church, where he seized the church's banner; he then gathered his men and courageously attacked the enemy. The Ruthenians took this to mean a new army with fresh troops had joined the battle, and began to retreat and flee. So Radwan's banner carried the day, and for this he received that church's banner for his shield, as well as other gifts.

Paprocki, however, gives this as occurring during the rule of Bolesław Chrobry [992–1025] in 1021. He writes that Radwan was a royal chancellor, which information he is supposed to have taken from ancient royal grants. I conclude from this that either this clan sign is more ancient than the time of Bolesław Śmiały [1058–1079] and originated in the time of Bolesław Krzywousty [1102–1138], to whom some authors ascribe its conferment on that aforementioned Radwan; or else that before the time of Bolesław Śmiały [1058–1079] the Radwans used some other arms in their seal: for instance, that Radwan whom Paprocki gives as Bishop of Poznań in 1138. Długosz, in 'Vitae Episcop. Posnan. [Lives of the Bishops of Poznań]' does not include him under Radwan arms, but Sreniawa; there I, too, will speak of him."

From Little Poland, the Śreniawa family/gens was insignificant and financially modest; however, King Kazimierz the Great (1310–1370) supported them in Little Poland.

Radwan, Bishop of Poznań, assisted with the establishment of the first Commandery of the Knights of Saint John in Poznań circa 1187 or possibly May 6, 1170. The donation was made by Mieszko III Stary (1121? – 1202), High Duke of all Poland.

== Ancient Origins and Reason for Many Surnames ==
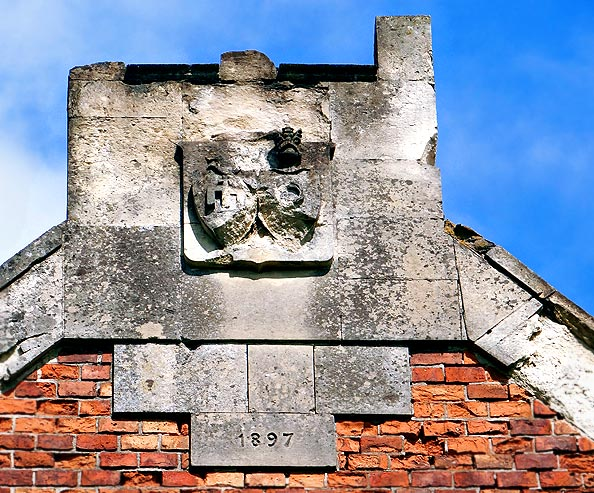
Stone cresting with herby (coats of arms) Radwan and Nałęcz from the Dąbrowski manor in Michałowice, Michałowice rural administrative district, Kraków county, Lesser Poland province, POLAND.

See: Szlachta: Origins of szlachta surnames.

The Polish state paralleled the Roman Empire in that full rights of citizenship were limited to the nobility/szlachta. The Polish nobility/szlachta in Poland, where Latin was written and spoken far and wide, used the Roman naming convention of the tria nomina (praenomen, nomen, and cognomen) to distinguish Polish citizens/nobles/szlachta from the peasantry and foreigners, hence why so many surnames are associated with the Radwan coat of arms.

Nomen (nomen gentile—name of the gens/ród or clan):

Radwan

Cognomen (name of the family sept within the gens):

For example—Braniecki, Dąbrowski, Czcikowski, Dostojewski, Górski, Nicki, Zebrzydowski, etc.

== Notable bearers ==
Dostoyevsky / Dostojewski coat of arms, a variant of Radwan

The Krukowski clan coat of arms, a variant of Radwan

Notable bearers of this coat of arms have included:

- Dąbrowski Manor in Michałowice
- Jarosław Dąbrowski
- Stefan Tytus Dąbrowski
- Fyodor Dostoyevsky (Polish spelling "Dostojewski")
- Samuel Osiński
- Jakub Uchański
- House of Wołodkowicz
- House of Zebrzydowski
  - Andrzej Zebrzydowski
  - Mikołaj Zebrzydowski
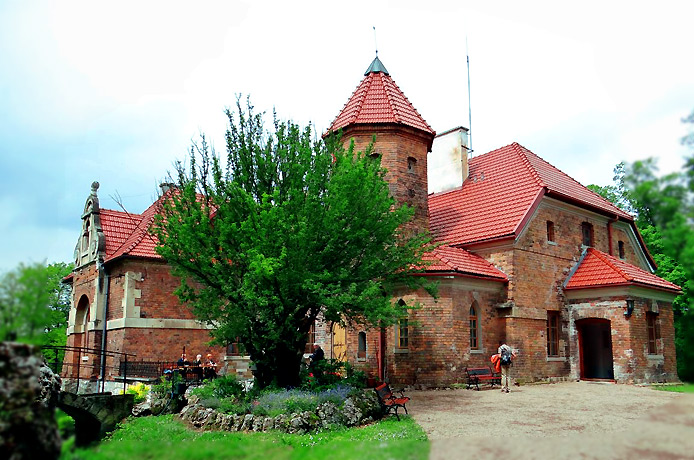
Dąbrowski Manor in Michałowice (1897–Present)

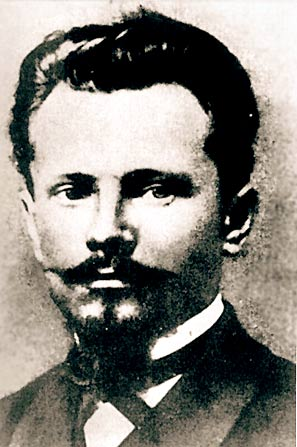
Jarosław Dąbrowski, herbu Radwan (1836–1871)

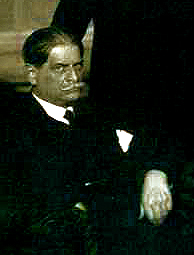
Stefan Tytus Dąbrowski, herbu Radwan (1877–1947)

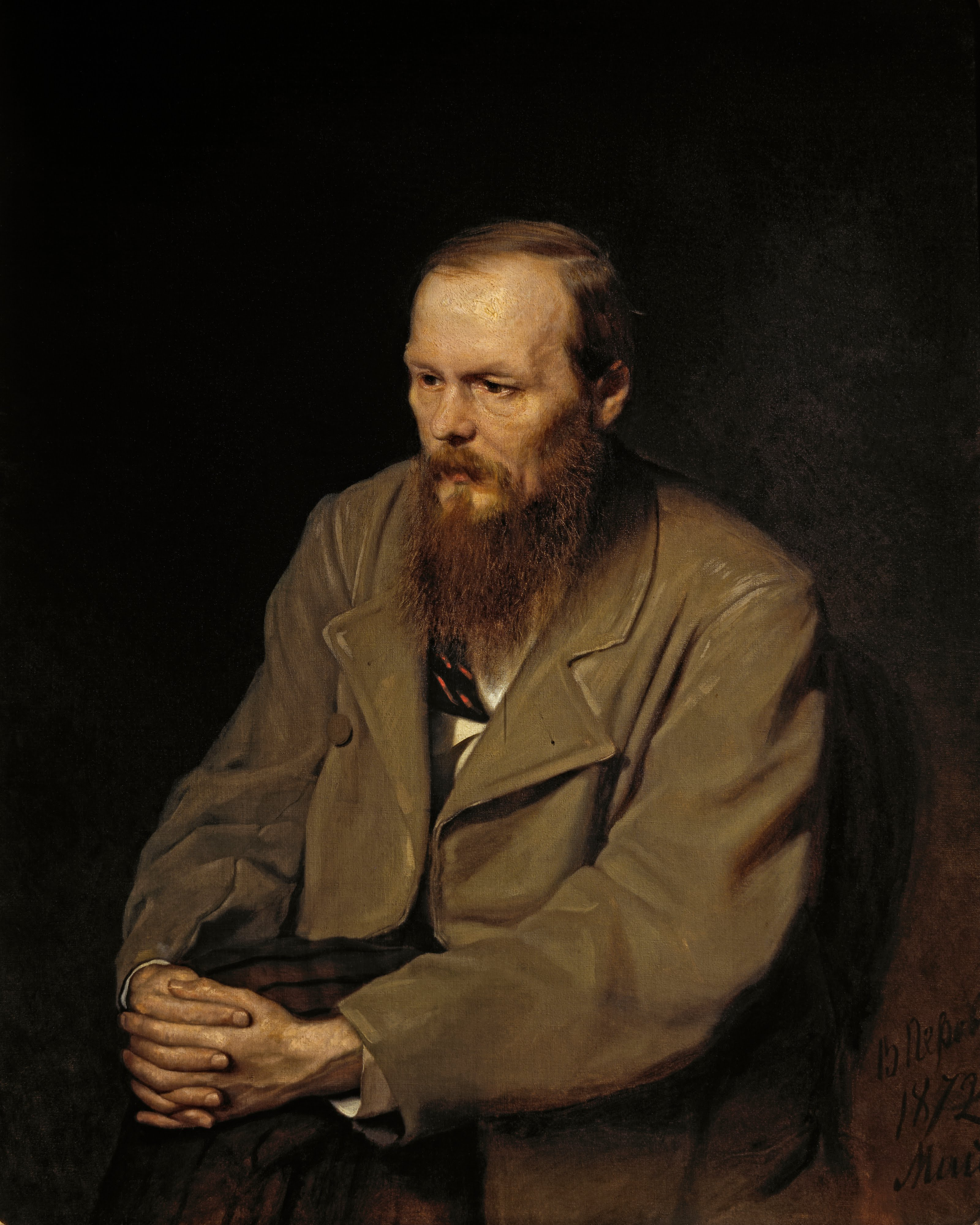
Fyodor Dostoyevsky herbu Radwan (1821–1881)

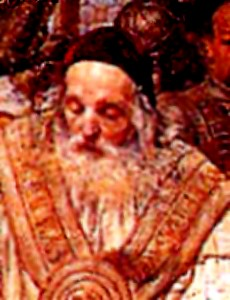
Jakub Uchański, herbu Radwan (1502–1581)

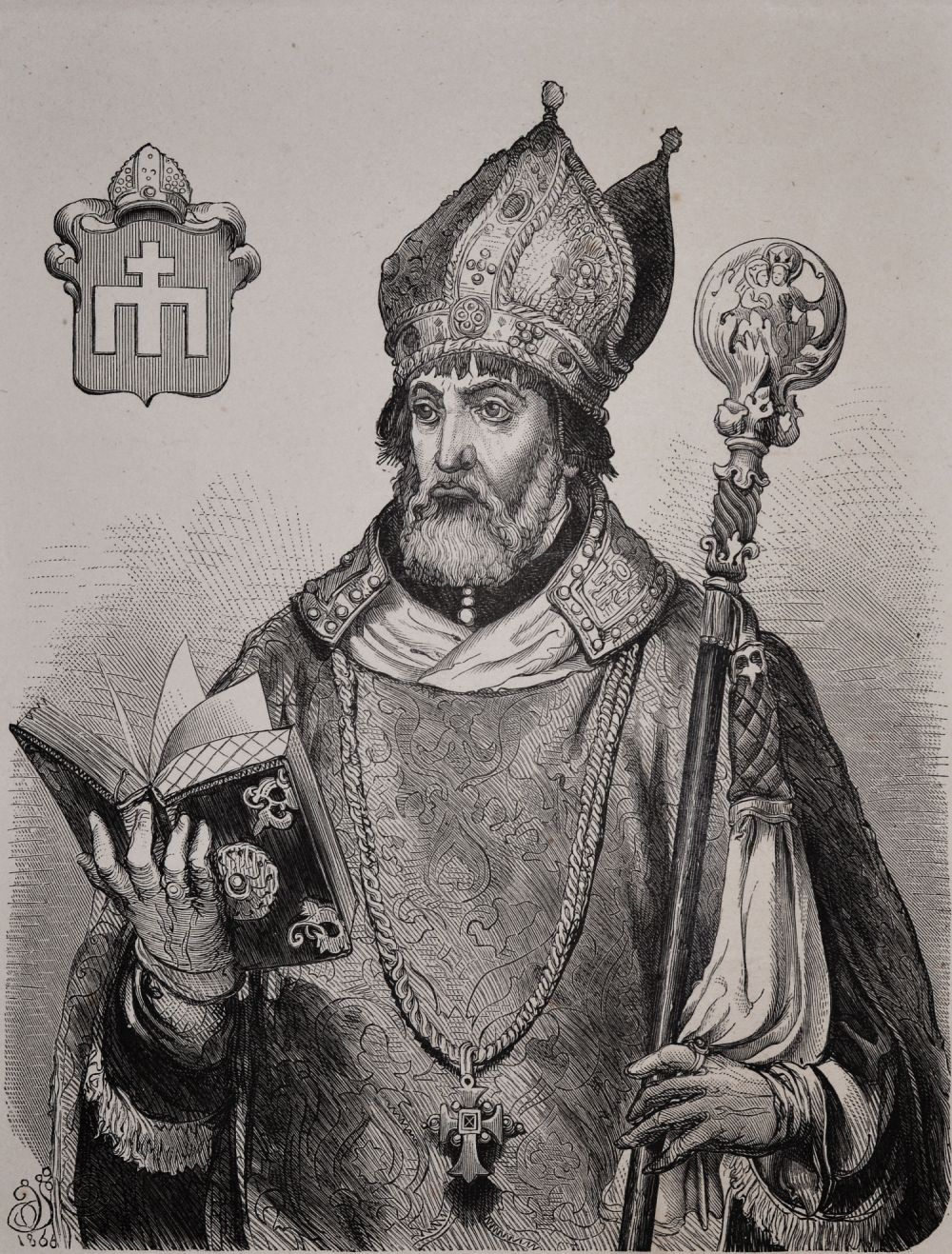
Andrzej Zebrzydowski, herbu Radwan (1496-1560)

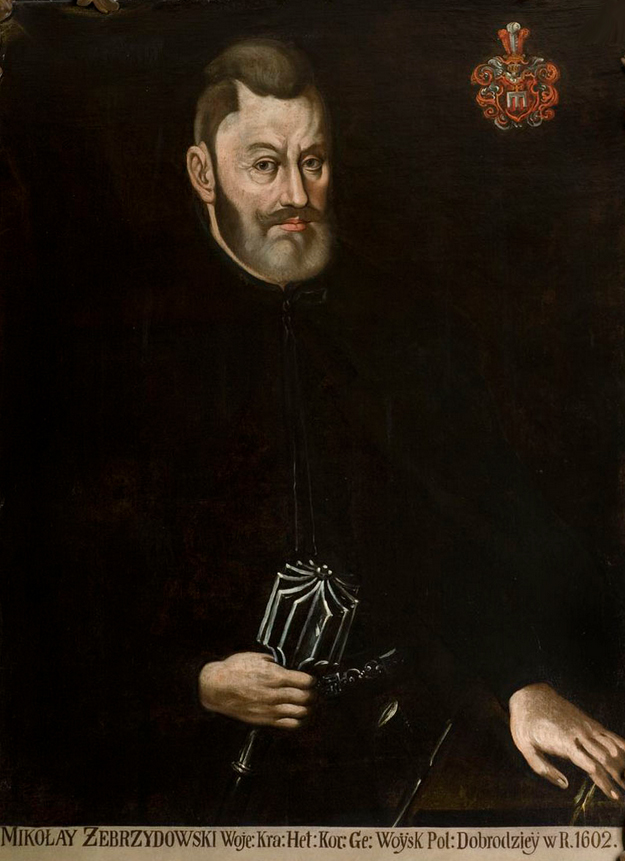
Mikołaj Zebrzydowski, herbu Radwan (1553–1620)

Friedrich Nietzsche wore a signet ring bearing the Radwan coat of arms. He often claimed his ancestors were Polish noblemen called either "Niëtzky" or "Niëzky," which was equated to the surname of the Polish family "Nicki" bearing the Radwan coat of arms. Most scholars dispute Nietzsche's account of his family's origins. Hans von Müller debunked the genealogy put forward by Nietzsche's sister in favour of Polish noble heritage. Max Oehler, Nietzsche's cousin and curator of the Nietzsche Archive at Weimar, argued that all of Nietzsche's ancestors bore German names, including the wives' families. Oehler claims that Nietzsche came from a long line of German Lutheran clergymen on both sides of his family, and modern scholars regard the claim of Nietzsche's Polish ancestry as "pure invention."

== See also ==
- Polish heraldry
- Heraldry
- Coat of Arms
