= Portrait of Barbara Lubomirska =

17th-century painting

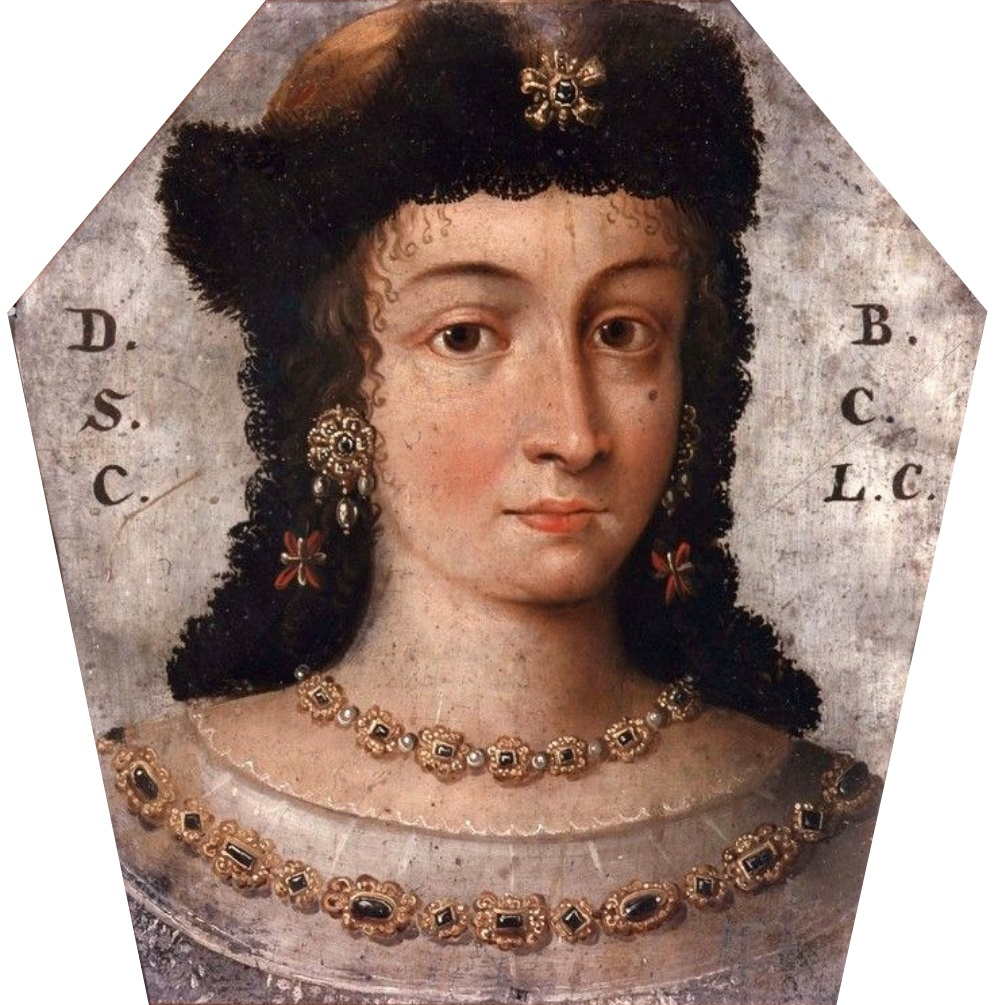
The portrait.

Portrait of Barbara Lubomirska is a 17th-century funerary portrait of the Polish noblewoman Barbara Lubomirska. She died between 1667 and 1676 and the portrait is shaped like a cross-section of her coffin. It was painted in oil on a sheet of metal by an anonymous master-painter active in Masovia in mid-second half of the 17th century. The painting is on display at the National Museum in Warsaw on loan from the Portrait Gallery of the Palace Museum in Wilanów. It is a prominent example of the funerary art tradition popular among the nobles (szlachta) of the Polish–Lithuanian Commonwealth.
