= Opacz Wielka =

Neighbourhood of Warsaw, Poland

- City Information System area (neighbourhood)
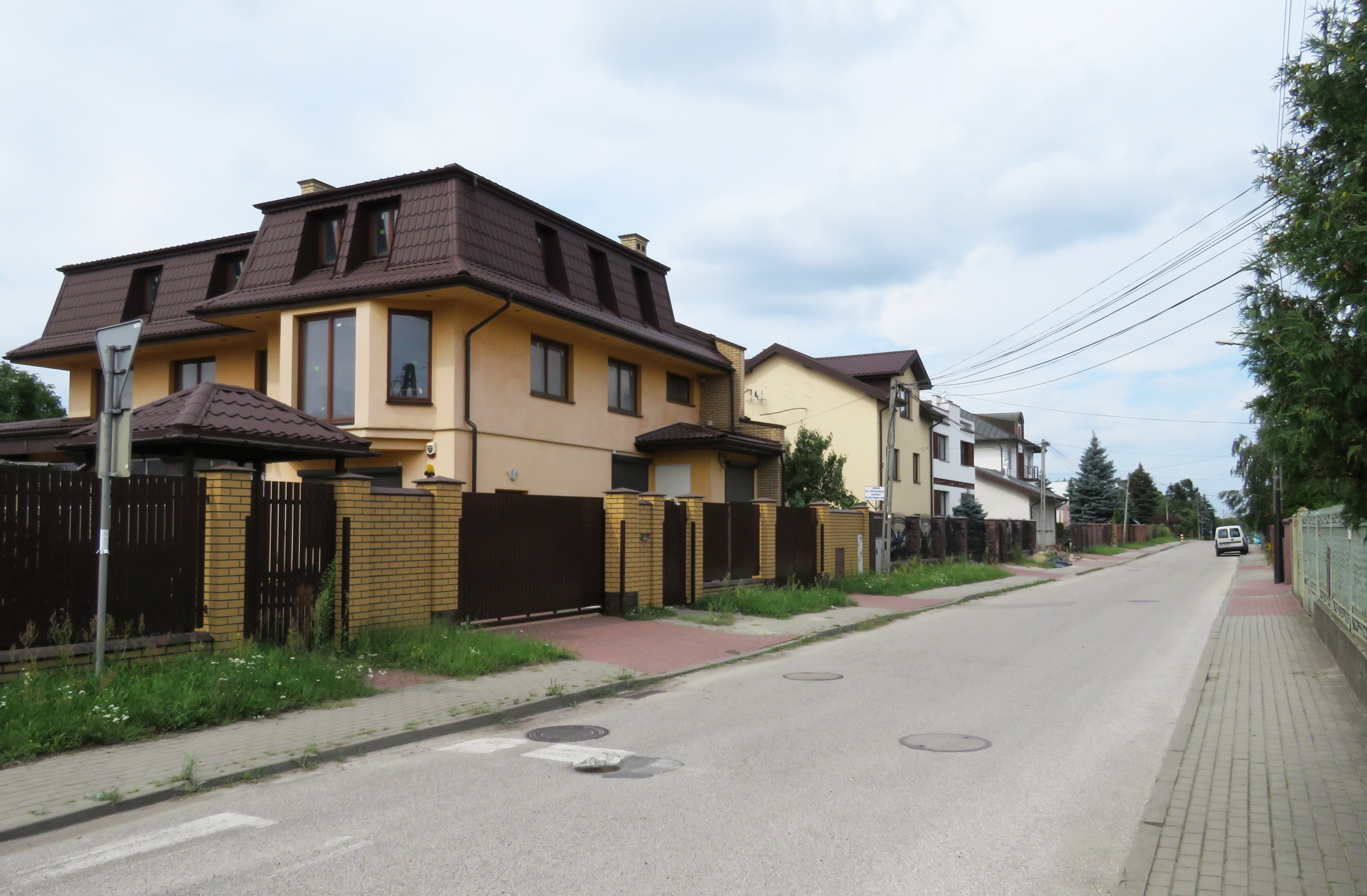
- Houses on Aksamitna Street in Opacz Wielka,

- Opacz Wielka within the Włochy district.
- Coordinates: 52°10′54″N 20°55′16″E
- Country: Poland
- Voivodeship: Masovian
- City county: Warsaw
- District: Włochy
- Time zone: UTC+1 (CET)
  - Summer (DST): UTC+2 (CEST)
- Area code: +48 22

Opacz Wielka (Polish: [ˈɔ.pat͡ʂ ˈvjɛl.ka]) is a neighbourhood, and a City Information System area, in Warsaw, Poland, within the Włochy district. It is a low-rise residential area. In the 15th century, the village of Opacz was founded in the area, and by the 19th century, it was divided into two parts, Opacz Duża and Opacz Mała. The first of the two was incorporated into Warsaw in 1951.

== History ==
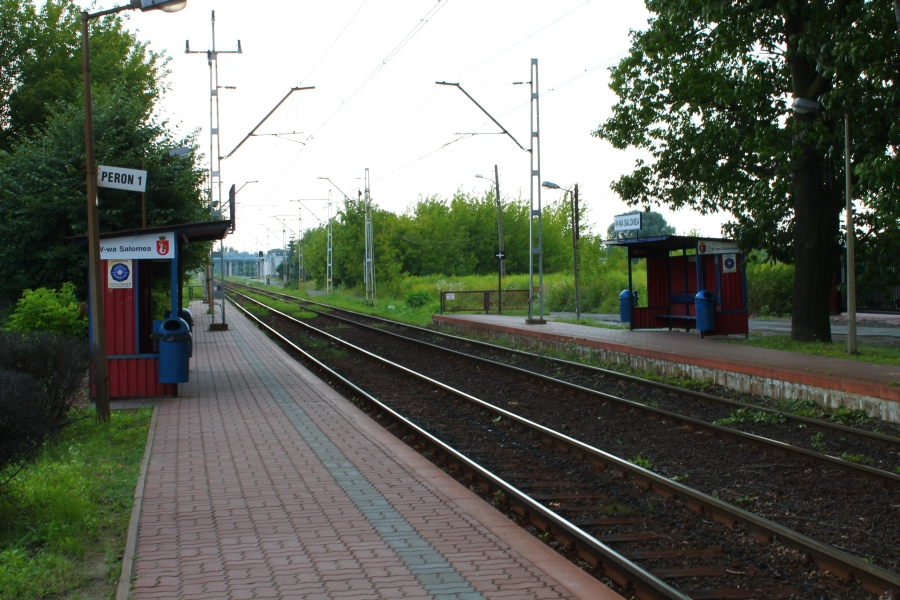
The Warszawa Salomea railway station, opened in 1927.

The village of Opacz was founded at the end of the 15th century, alongside modern Jutrzenki Street. It was owned by the Opacki family of the clan of Prus. In 1528, the village, along with its surrounding farmlands, measured approximately 6 lans, an equivalent of around 102 ha (0.39 sq mi). In the 18th century, it was acquired by Arnold Anastazy Byszewski, the lieutenant general of the Crown Army, and the aide-de-camp of King Stanisław August Poniatowski, becoming part of his large landed estate. In the 19th century, the hamlet of Salomea was separated from the northwestern portion of Opacz. By 1827, Opacz was divided into two settlements, Opacz Duża (lit. 'Large Opacz') to the northeast, and Opacz Mała (lit. 'Small Opacz') to the southwest, which had 141 and 72 residents, respectively. Following the abolition of serfdom in 1864, they were incorporated into the municipality of Skorosze. In the late 19th century, three small ponds, known as Załuski Clay Pits, formed to the southeast of Opacz, from the flooded pits, left after the excavation of clay for the local brickworks industry.

The area of Opacz began to develop rapidly throughout the early 20th century. In 1927, the tracks of the Electric Commuter Railway (now operated by the Warsaw Commuter Railway) were constructed with stations in Opacz and Salomea. In the 1930s, a hamlet, originally known as Opacz, and now as Opacz-Kolonia, was founded to the southwest of Opacz Duża. On 1 April 1939, Opacz Duża, and a southern portion of Opacz-Kolonia, then named Opacz-Parcela, were incorporated to the new municipality of Okęcie. Opacz Mała, as well as the remaining portion of Opacz-Kolonia, remained within the municipality of Skorosze. In 1943, Opacz-Parcela and Opacz Duża had 408 and 347 residents, respectively.

On 6 March 1944, while Opacz-Kolonia was under German occupation during the Second World War, six officers of the Home Army were captured in the village by the Volksdeutsche Nazi sympathizers, and executed by the Field Police Corps. In May 1944, a division of the Directorate of Diversion of the Home Army, executed five people responsible for the capture of Polish resistance soldiers, while two more were killed two weeks later. On 15 May 1951, Opacz Duża and Opacz-Parcela were incorporated into the city of Warsaw. Opacz-Kolonia and Opacz Mała remained as separate villages, outside the city boundaries.

On 19 May 2004, the district of Włochy was subdivided into areas of the City Information System, with Opacz Wielka (lit. 'Great Opacz') becoming one of them, including the historic areas of Opacz Duża and Opacz-Parcela. Between 2010 and 2013, two intersecting expressways were constructed passing through Opacz Wielka, forming a part of a ring road around Warsaw, including Salomea–Wolica Route on a west–east axis, the Expressway S2 on a north–south axis. During their construction, the entirety of the largest pond, and portion of the second largest pond of the Załuski Clay Pits, were drained and built over.

== Characteristics ==
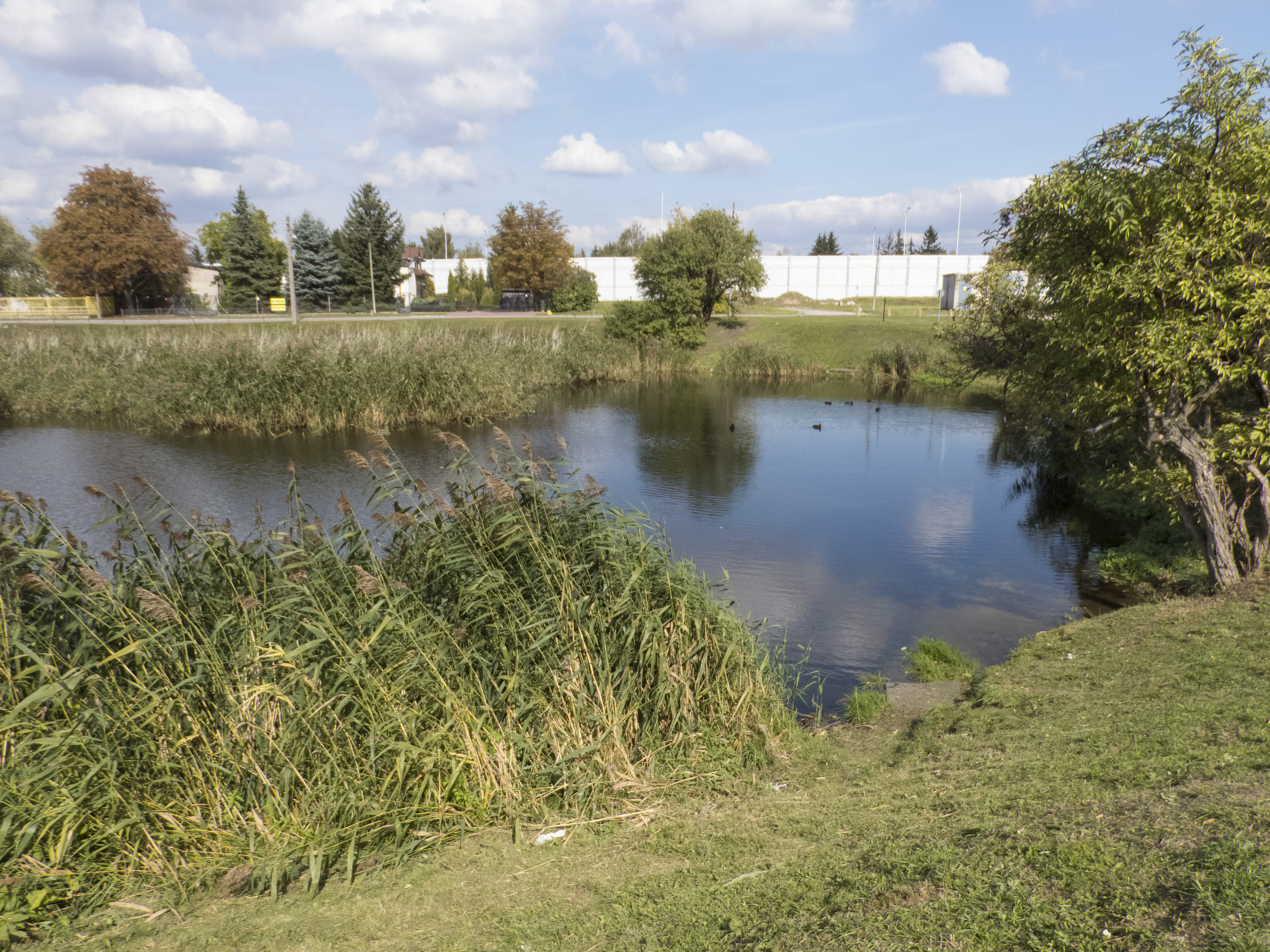
One of two ponds of Załuski Clay Pits in Opacz Wielka.

Opacz Wielka is a low-rise residential area featuring single-family detached homes. It also includes a few warehouses and factories and manufacture buildings, and a small farmland area. The area also includes the neighbourhood of Opacz-Parcela in the south, in the area of Krótka Street. Opacz Wielka also features two small ponds near Emaliowa Street, known as Załuski Clay Pits. Opacz Wielka is crossed by the railway tracks with the Warszawa Salomea station present at its northern boundary, at the intersection of Jutrzenki and Serwituty Streets. Its operated by the Warsaw Commuter Railway. Additionally, two intersecting expressways pass through the neighbourhood, including the Salomea–Wolica Route on a west–east axis, the Expressway S2 on a north–south axis.

== Location and boundaries ==
Okęcie is a City Information System area in Warsaw, located in the northeastern portion of the Włochy district. Its northern border is determined in a horizontal line to the south of the Warszawa Salomea railway station, stretching between Badylarska Street and Działkowa Street. Its eastern border is determined by Działkowa Street, and in a straight line continuing to the south until Finałowa Street. To the south, its border is determined by the city boundary with the municipality of Raszyn, particularly based on Finałowa Street, around the Załuski Clay Pits, and Rebusowa Street, and by the boundary of the municipality of Michałowice, partially based on Rebusowa Streer. Its western boundary is determined by Badylarska Street. The neighbourhood borders Salomea to the north, Okęcie, and Załuski to the east, the municipality of Raszyn to the south, the municipality of Michałowice to the south-west, and Skorosze to the north-west. Its northwestern boundary forms the district's border with Ursus, while its southern boundary forms the city border with Pruszków County.
