= Opacz-Parcela =

Neighbourhood of Warsaw, Poland

- Neighbourhood
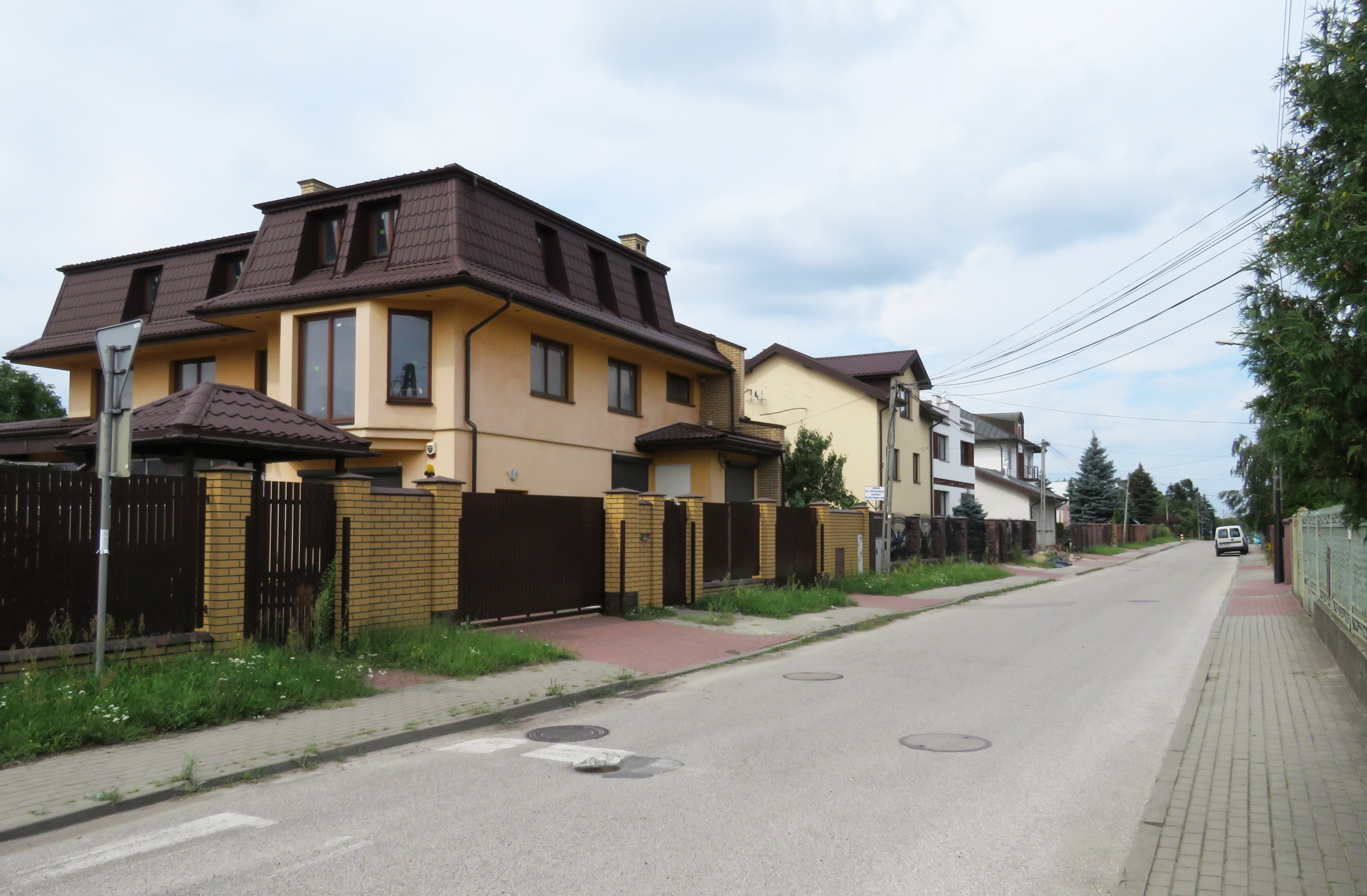
- Houses on Aksamitna Street in Opacz-Parcela.
- Interactive map of Opacz-Parcela
- Coordinates: 52.171084°N 20.927235°E
- Country: Poland
- Voivodeship: Masovian
- City county: Warsaw
- District: Włochy
- City Information System area: Opacz Wielka
- Time zone: UTC+1 (CET)
  - Summer (DST): UTC+2 (CEST)
- Area code: +48 22

Opacz Parcela (Polish: [ˈɔ.pat͡ʂ parˈt͡sɛ.la]) is a neighbourhood of Warsaw, Poland, within the Włochy district, in the City Information System area of Opacz Wielka. It is a low-rise residential area. In the 15th century, the village of Opacz was founded in the area, with Opacz-Parcela being separated from it in 1939. It was incorporated into Warsaw in 1951.

== History ==
The village of Opacz (now Opacz Wielka) was founded at the end of the 15th century, alongside modern Jutrzenki Street. It was owned by the Opacki family of the clan of Prus. In 1528, the village, along with its surrounding farmlands, measured approximately 6 lans, an equivalent of around 102 ha (0.39 sq mi). In the 18th century, it was acquired by Arnold Anastazy Byszewski, the lieutenant general of the Crown Army, and the aide-de-camp of King Stanisław August Poniatowski, becoming part of his large landed estate. By 1827, Opacz was divided into two settlements, Opacz Duża (lit. 'Large Opacz') to the northeast, and Opacz Mała (lit. 'Small Opacz') to the southwest, which had 141 and 72 residents, respectively. Following the abolition of serfdom in 1864, they were incorporated into the municipality of Skorosze. In the late 19th century, three small ponds, known as Załuski Clay Pits, formed to the southeast of Opacz, from the flooded pits, left after the excavation of clay for the local brickworks industry.

The area of Opacz began to develop rapidly throughout the early 20th century. In the 1930s, a hamlet, originally known as Opacz, and now as Opacz-Kolonia, was founded to the southwest of Opacz Duża. On 1 April 1939, Opacz Duża, and a southern portion of Opacz-Kolonia, then named Opacz-Parcela, were incorporated into the new municipality of Okęcie. Opacz Mała, as well as the other portion of Opacz-Kolonia, remained within the municipality of Skorosze. In 1943, Opacz-Parcela and Opacz Duża had 408 and 347 residents, respectively.

Between 2010 and 2013, the Expressway S2 was constructed passing next to Opacz-Parcela, forming a part of a ring road around Warsaw. During their construction, the entirety of the largest pond, and portion of the second largest pond of the Załuski Clay Pits, were drained and built over.

== Characteristics ==
Opacz-Parcela is low-rise residential area featuring single-family detached homes, located in the area of Krótka Street. To its south, the neighbourhood is passed by the Expressway S2, which forms a ring road around Warsaw, and also two small ponds near Emaliowa Street, known as Załuski Clay Pits.
