= Włochy =

City district of Warsaw, Poland

- City district
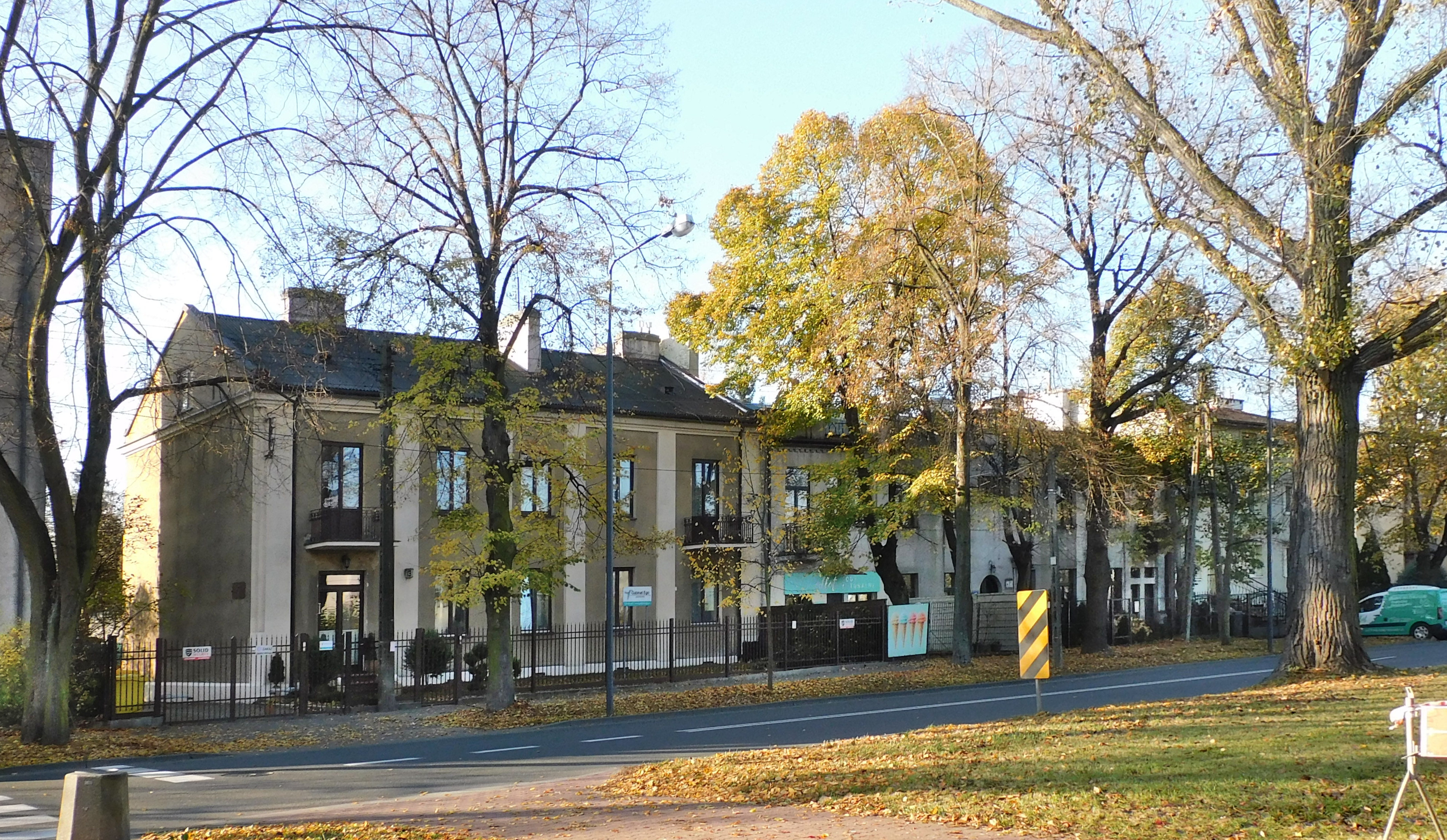
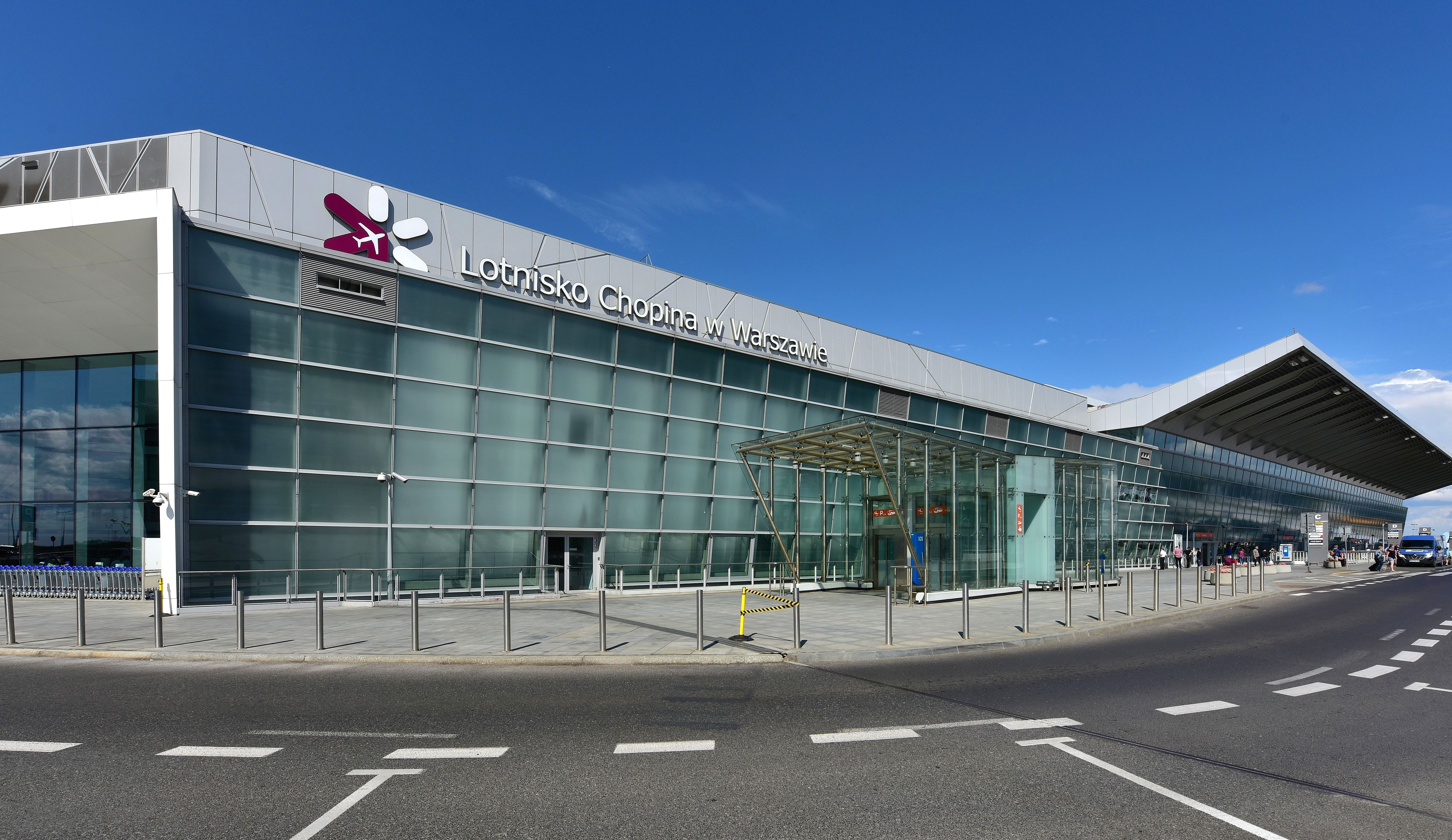
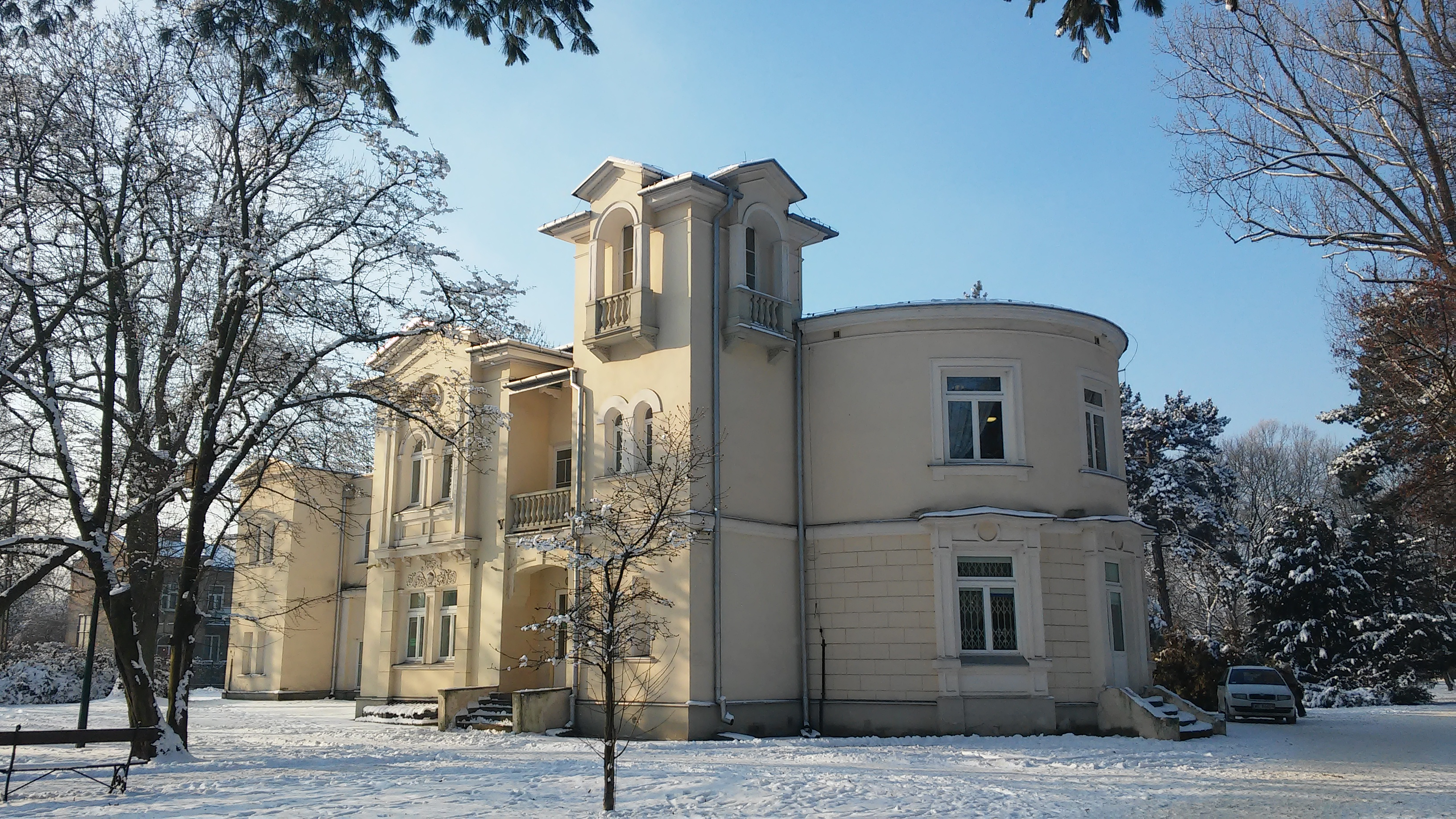
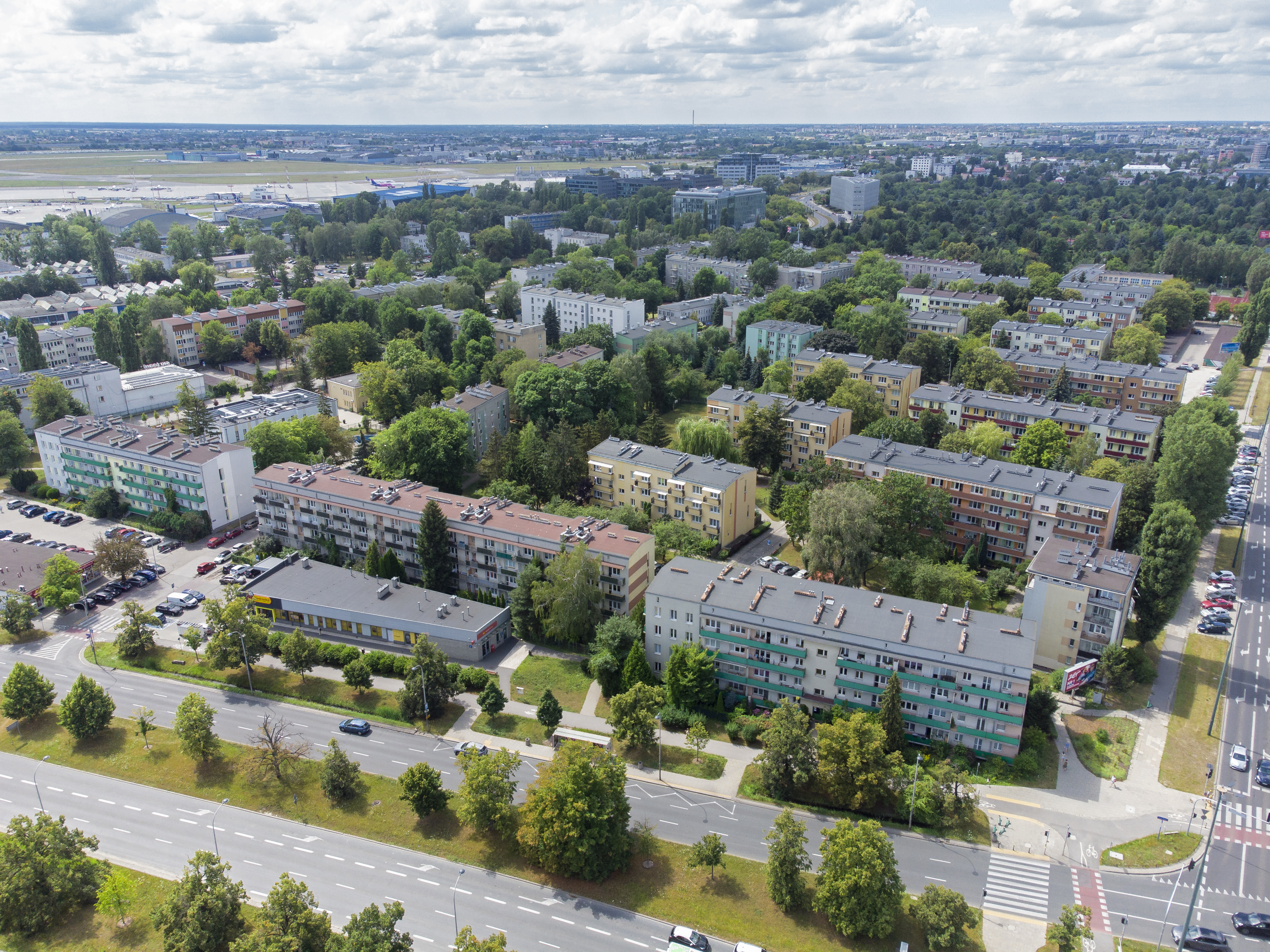
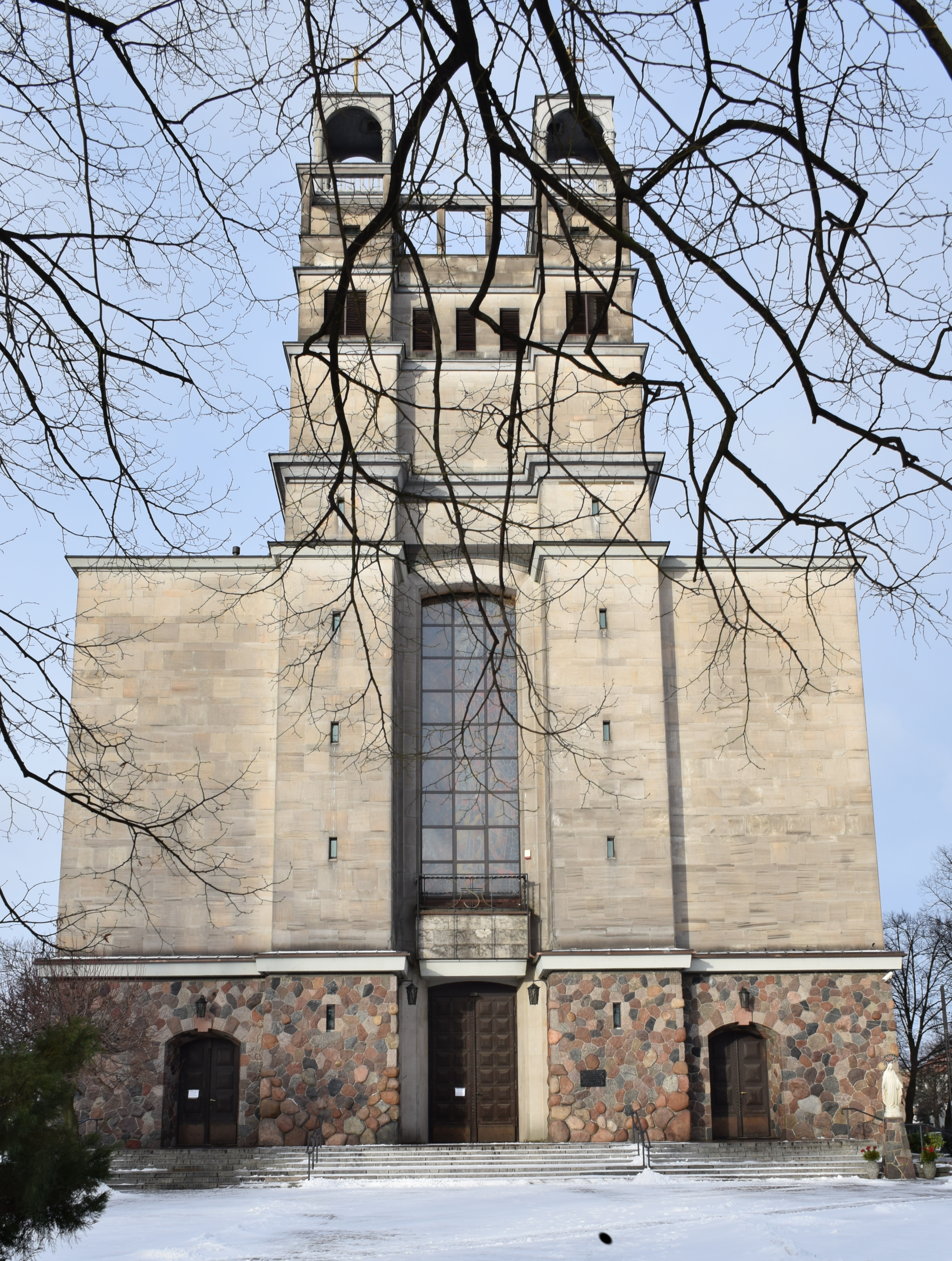
- Townhouses in New Włochy Warsaw Chopin Airport Koelichen Palace Apartment buildings of Okęcie Lotnisko Church of Saints Teresa of the Child Jesus and the Roman Martyrs

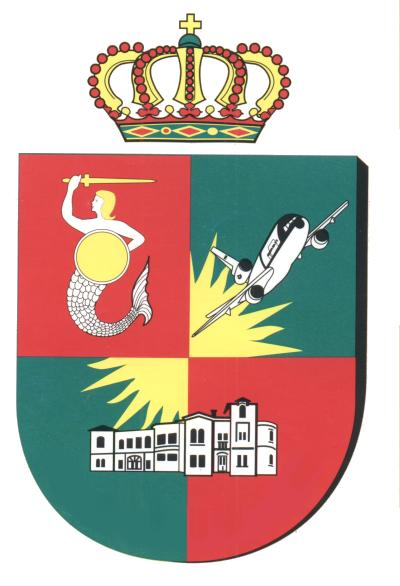
- Coat of arms

- Location of Włochy within Warsaw
- Coordinates: 52°12′N 20°55′E
- Country: Poland
- Voivodeship: Masovian
- City and county: Warsaw
- Establishment: 27 October 2002
- Seat: 257 Krakowska Avenue

Government
  - Mayor: Jarosław Karcz

Area
  - Total: 28.63 km^{2} (11.05 sq mi)

Population (2024)
  - Total: 50,753
  - Density: 1,773/km^{2} (4,591/sq mi)
- Time zone: UTC+1 (CET)
  - Summer (DST): UTC+2 (CEST)
- Area code: +48 22
- Website: wlochy.um.warszawa.pl

Włochy (Polish: [ˈvwɔ.xɘ̟]) is a district of the city of Warsaw, Poland. It has an area of 28.63 km^{2} (11.05 sq mi), and in 2024, it was inhabited by 50,753 people, making it the 16th in the city by both population and area, and as such, its 3rd smallest district by both metrics. It is located in the southwest part of the city, bordering Bemowo, Ochota, and Wola to the north, Mokotów and Ursynów to the east, and Ursus, to the northwest. Its southwestern boundary was marked by the city border with the municipalities of Michałowice and Raszyn in Pruszków County. The district is predominantly a residential area featuring low-rise single-family housing, with lesser presence of apartment buildings, with neighbourhoods such Włochy in the northwest, as well as Okęcie, Opacz Wielka, and Załuski in the central south. The area in the northeast is dominated by several housing estates with mid-rise apartment buildings, including Jadwisin, Okęcie Lotnisko, Raków, and Salomea.

The southeastern area of the district features the Warsaw Chopin Airport, which, in 2024, it was the busiest airport in Poland and the 28th busiest airport in Europe, with 21.3 million passengers in 2024, handling approximately 40% of the country's total air passenger traffic. It forms a central hub for the LOT Polish Airlines. The area around the airport features factories and warehouses partially dedicated to the aviation industry, as well as the Institute of Aviation, a state-owned research institution specialised in the aviation and astronautics. The area also includes numerous railway stations, such as Chopin Airport, Aleje Jerozolimskie, Warszawa Okęcie, Warszawa Ursus Północny, and Warszawa Włochy. Włochy includes historical buildings, such as the Koelichen Palace, a neoclassical residence, from 1859, and Fort V "Włochy". It also has two historic churches, the Church of the Epiphany, from 1939, and the Church of Saints Teresa of the Child Jesus and the Roman Martyrs, built between 1946 and 1962. They belong to the Lutheran and Roman Catholic denominations, respectively. The district also features a few parks, including: Black Grouse Ponds Park, Combatants Park, Goat Pond Park, and Space Gardens.

The villages of Sopęchy and Stojarty were first recorded in the area of modern Włochy in 1395 and 1493, respectively. They were founded by the Rakowski family of the clan of Radwan, descending from count Gotard of Służew. The village Raków was also founded in the area in the 13th century, and in the following century, the village of Okęcie was separated from it. In 1452, a portion of Porzucewo was sold to Jan Włoch, and the village was eventually renamed after him to Włochy in the following century. In the 15th century, villages of Gorzkiewki, Opacz, and Zbarż. In 1447, Raków received Kulm law rights, and was followed by Gorzkiewki and Zbarż in 1451. In the 16th century, the village of Górki was founded in the area, and was later destroyed together with Sopęchy (from 16th century known as Witki) by Swedish forces in 1656, during the Second Northern War. In the 17th century, the villages of Paluch and Załuski were founded, while Stojarty was recorded for the last time. In 1795, the estate of Włochy was acquired by count Tadeusz Antoni Mostowski, who developed there his residence together with an English landscape garden, which now forms the Combatants Park. In 1859, in its place was constructed the neoclassical residence, known as the Koelichen Palace. In 1888, three forts were built in the area, as part of the city fortifications, known as the Warsaw Fortress, now surviving as ruins. In the second half of the 19th century, the manufacturing industry developed in Włochy. The hamlets of Budki Szczęśliwickie and Wiktoryn were also founded nearby. In 1926, the estate was partitioned and sold off for the development of a residential neighbourhood with villa houses. In 1959, a railway station was opened in Włochy, and later, three more stations were opened in nearby Raków, Salomea, and Wiktoryn, as part of the Electric Commuter Railway. In 1930, Włochy became the seat of a new municipality, named after it, which also included Solipse and Wiktoryn. In 1934, the Warsaw Chopin Airport was opened in the area, becoming the largest airport in the country, and the hub of the LOT Polish Airlines. Numerous factories also developed around it. In 1939, Solipse, Włochy, and Wiktoryn were merged together, forming the town of Włochy. The same year, Okęcie became the seat of the municipality named after it, which also incorporated the neighbouring settlements.

The area was captured by German Wehrmacht on 8 September 1939, during the first days of the Second World War, and was later sight of battle during the siege of Warsaw on 12 September, when a few companies from the 360th Infantry Regiment of the Polish Armed Forces, together with two tank companies, attacked German positions in Okęcie, briefly recapturing the airport, before being pushed back in the area of Załuski, after experiencing heavy casualties. While the area remained under the German occupation, the airport was used for cargo transportation, and as a base for the German Air Force. From November 1940 to February 1941, a ghetto operated near Solipse, with around 300 Jewish residents, before being closed with its population relocated to the Warsaw Ghetto. On 1 August 1944, a small company of the 7th Infantry Regiment of the Home Army, attacked the airport on the first day of the Warsaw Uprising. The attack ended in failure, with majority of the attackers being killed. On 16 September 1944, German authorities rounded up over 4,000 men, between the ages of 16 and 50, constituting almost the entire working-age male population of the town. Majority of them were subsequently sent to concentration camps to perform forced labour, with around half being estimated to have died as the consequence.

The area was incorporated into Warsaw in 1951, becoming part of the Ochota district. Between 1958 and 1972, two housing estates, known as Jadwisin and Okęcie Lotnisko, were constructed in its northeastern portion, for a total of around 12,800 residents. The airport was expanded and modernised between the 1960s and 1980s. In 1994, the area of was separated from Ochota, forming its own administrative unit as the municipality of Warsaw-Włochy. In 2002, it was restructured into the Włochy district. Throughout 2010s and 2020s, the neighbourhood of Raków transformed into a residential neighbourhood with modernist apartment buildings.

== Toponymy ==
The city district is named after the neighbourhood of Włochy, located in its northwestern portion. The latter was in turn named after Jan Włoch, who acquired its portion in 1452, when it was a small village, originally known as Porzucewo. It was first recorded as Włochy in 1517, and in 1523, as Włochy alias Porzucewo. The latter name was eventually completely dropped in the first half of the 16th century. The name was adopted by the district with its creation in 1994. Term Włochy in Polish, also translates to the name of Italy in English. However, both locations have different adjectives and demonyms. For the neighbourhood and district, they are "włochowski" and "Włochowianin", while for the country, they are "włoski" and "Włoch", respectively.

== History ==
=== Middle ages ===
In 1232, the village of Raków was first recorded in the area, when it was given to knight Gotard of Służew, by Duke Konrad I of Masovia, the ruler of the Duchy of Masovia. In 1395, the village of Sopęchy (later renamed to Witki in the 16th century), also owned by the Rakowiecki family, the descents of Gotard, was first recorded in the area of the modern Budki Szczęśliwickie Street. Two more villages, Zbarż and Gorzkiewki, owned by the Zbarski family, were recorded near the modern Żwirki i Wigury Street, in 1409 and 1422, respectively. In 1493, the village of Stojarty, also founded by the Rakowiecki family, was also recorded in the area of modern Wiktoryn Street, near Sopęchy. At the turn of the 14th century, the hamlet of Rakowiec separated from Raków, and was later also followed by Okęcie. The latter was first attested in records in 1421. They were owned by the Rakowiecki family, which descended from Gotard of Służew, and was part of the Radwan clan. The settlements were placed near the Sadurka stream, which flowed through that area of modern Włochy until sometime between the 1920s and 1930s, when its course was altered and directed through underground canals, with Służewiec Stream currently being its only remainder.

In the 15th century, the villages of Porzucewo and Solipse, were separated from Sopęchy. The village of Opacz was founded at the end of the century, alongside modern Jutrzenki Street. Solipse was first recorded in 1435. In 1452, a portion of Porzucewo was sold to Jan Włoch, and the village was eventually renamed after him. In 1517, it was recorded as Włochy, and in 1523, as Włochy alias Porzucewo. The latter name was eventually completely dropped in the first half of the 16th century. In 1447, Raków was granted the Kulm law rights by Duke Bolesław IV of Warsaw, the ruler of the Duchy of Masovia, with Gorzkiewki and Zbarż also receiving them in 1451.

=== Early modern period ===
In the 16th century, the village of Górki was founded in the area by the Górek family of the clan of Łodzia. In 1652, Okęcie was bought by Paweł Petrykowski, the parson of Drohiczyn and archdeacon of Pułtusk. Following which, the hamlet of Paluch was founded between Okęcie and Gorzkiewki. The same century, Raków was acquired by magnate and politician Stanisław Warszycki, while Gorzkiewki and Zbarż, became property of Jakub Hieronim Rozdrażewski, the voivode of Inowrocław Voivodeship. In the first half of the 17th century, the landed estate of Włochy was acquired by Andrzej Leszczyński, the Grand Chancellor of the Crown and the primate of Poland, who built there his manor house around 1650. The manor, as well as the villages of Górki and Witki, were burned down by the Swedish army in 1656, during the Second Northern War, and its area eventually became part of Włochy. The nearby Stojarty was also recorded for the last time in the 17th century. In the second half of the 17th century, a hamlet of Załuski was founded in place of the former Górki. It was established by, and named after, Andrzej Chryzostom Załuski, the Grand Chancellor of the Crown and the bishop of Warmia. In the 19th century, the hamlet of Kalinowo was founded nearby Załuski and was later incorporated into it. In the 18th century, Arnold Anastazy Byszewski, the lieutenant general of the Crown Army, and the aide-de-camp of King Stanisław August Poniatowski, acquired Opacz Duża, Opacz Mała, and Paluch, and Salomea.

=== 19th century ===
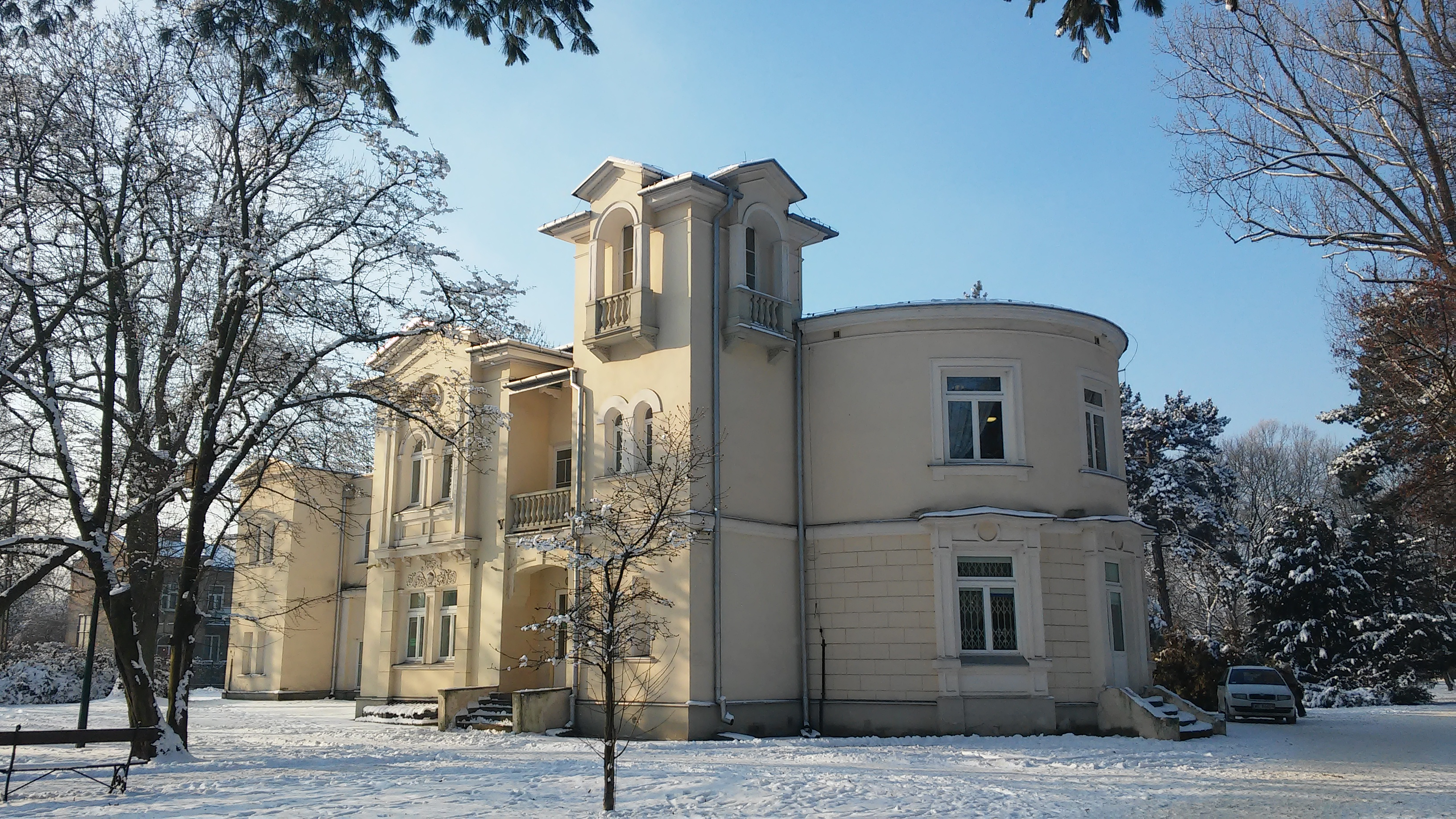
The Koelichen Palace, built in 1859.

In 1795, the estate of Włochy was acquired by count Tadeusz Antoni Mostowski, a politician and statesman, who later would become the Minister of Interior of the Duchy of Warsaw, and the president of the Government Committee of the Interior of the Kingdom of Poland. Around 1800, he had his residence built in place of the manor of the Leszczyński family, with a garden developed around it. In 1842, they were redeveloped as a neoclassical palace and an English landscape garden, respectively. The estate was acquired in 1844 by entrepreneur Andrzej Koelichen. The residence was again rebuilt in 1859, with a design by architect Aleksander Zabienowski, becoming known as the Koelichen Palace.

In the 19th century, the hamlet of Salomea was separated from the northwestern portion of Opacz. In 1827, the two largest settlements in the area, Solipse and Raków, had 262 and 185 inhabitants, respectively. By this year, the village of Opacz was divided into two settlements, Opacz Duża (lit. 'Large Opacz') to the northeast, and Opacz Mała (lit. 'Small Opacz') to the southwest. During the century, several brickworks developed in the area, with the first factory, owned by the Koelichen family, opening in 1842. The mining of clay in the area, used in the brick production, left behind numerous shallow pits, which then flooded, forming small lakes, such as Black Grouse Ponds and Goat Pond. The hamlet of Zosin was founded in the same century between Raków and Szczęśliwice, for the employees of the local brickworks industry. By the end of the century, a heavy manufacturing industry also developed in Włochy. In 1845, railway tracks were built passing through the area. In the second half of the 19th century, the hamlet of Wiktoryn was founded to the east of Włochy. In 1859, the Warszawa Włochy station was established for cargo trains, and after 1863, it also opened to passenger service. Following the abolition of serfdom in 1864, the area was divided between two municipalities: Skorosze and Wilanów. Skorosze incorporated majority of the area, while Wilanów incorporated villages of Gorzkiewki, Paluch and Zbarż.

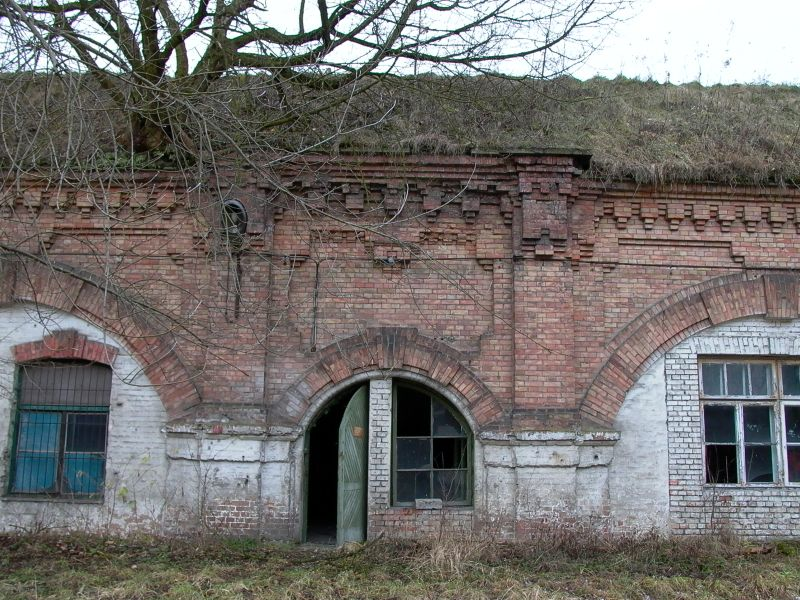
The retired barracks of Fort V "Włochy", built in 1888.

Between 1883 and 1888, Forts V "Włochy", VI "Okęcie", and VII "Zbarż" were constructed by the Imperial Russian Army in the area, as part of the city fortifications, known as the Warsaw Fortress. The government heavily restricted construction in their vicinity, hindering the development of the nearby villages. Around that time, Kraków Road (now forming Krakowska Avenue) was also built next to the village, connecting Warsaw and Kraków. The fortifications in the area were retired and partially demolished in 1913, leading to greater development in the villages in the area. Afterwards, Raków-Kolonia was founded to the west of Fort VI "Okęcie". Additionally, the abandoned complex of Fort V "Włochy" were taken over by the impoverished and homeless population of Włochy and Solipse, with several small shacks developing in the area. In 1930, the squatter settlement was inhabited by several families, and by 1939, it had a population of around 300 people. Another small shanty settlement, known as Budki Szczęśliwickie was also founded alongside a street extending to the west from the Kraków Road (now Krakowska Avenue), now forming Włodarzewska and Budki Szczęśliwickie Street. It consisted of small shacks made from wood, metal, and plywood.

=== Early 20th century ===
In 1923, tram tracks were constructed alongside Kraków Road (now Krakowska Avenue), connecting Okęcie and Raków to Warsaw. It had a turning loop at the intersection of current Malowicza Street and Krakowska Avenue.

In 1926, the landed estate of Włochy was partitioned and sold off for the development of a residential neighbourhood with villa houses. It was designed as a garden suburb by Franciszek Krzywda-Polkowski and Miłosław Kotyński, with an average plot of land measuring 700 m^{2} (7534.7 sq ft). The same year, the Włochy Fire Guard, a local fire department, was established, and in 1928, the local police station was also opened. Additionally, in 1928, the garden around the Koelichen Palace was opened to the public as a recreational urban space, known as the Combatants Park. The same year, the Przyszłość Włochy sports club was also founded in the village. A year later, the Okęcie Warsaw association football club was also established, being based in Okęcie.

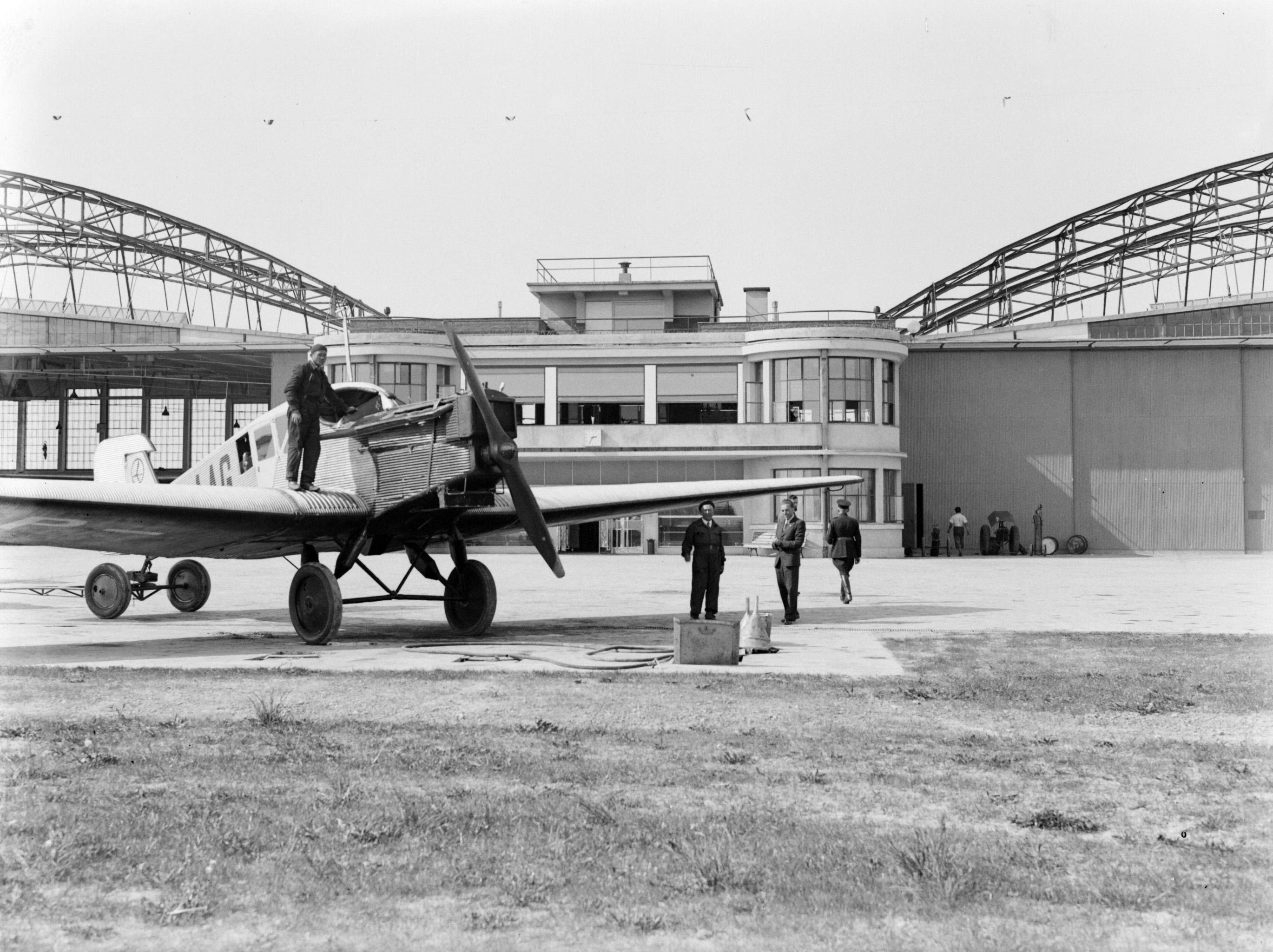
The Warsaw Chopin Airport in Okęcie in 1934.

In 1925, the government acquired 285 ha of land from Okęcie, Paluch, and Gorzkiewki, for the development of the Warsaw Chopin Airport, known until 2001 as the Warsaw Okęcie Airport, and another 200 ha for the nearby infrastructure. Its construction began in 1933, and it was opened on 29 April 1934, becoming the largest airport in Poland. It included two dirt intersecting runways, measuring 1,470 and 1,270 m (4,822.84 and 4,166.67 ft). It was originally only planned as a military airbase. However, upon its opening, it also replaced Mokotów Aerodrome as a passenger and cargo airport. It also became the central hub for the LOT Polish Airlines, and the home base of the 1st Aviation Regiment of the Polish Armed Forces. The construction of the airport led to the development of numerous factories in the area throughout 1920s and 1930s. They mostly catered to the aviation industry were also developed, such as Doświadczalne Warsztaty Lotnicze (Experimental Aeronautical Workshops) and Państwowe Zakłady Lotnicze (State Aviation Works), and research institutions, such as the Institute of Aviation. Additionally, in 1932, a weather station was also opened next to the airport. In 1934, Żwirki i Wigury Street was opened, providing a direct connection between the airport and the Downtown Warsaw. The creation of the airport and manufacturing industry led to the rapid development of Okęcie, and its incorporation of Raków into its territory in the late 1920s.

In 1927, the tracks of the Electric Commuter Railway were constructed, with stations in Salomea, Raków, and Wiktoryn. The line formed a connection between Warsaw and Grodzisk Mazowiecki. In 1932, a branch line was constructed alongside Popularna Street, extending the railway line to Warszawa Włochy station. The Wiktoryn station was moved to the new line, at the intersection of Popularna and Krańcowa Streets, and was later renamed to Warszawa Włochy Graniczna. In 1934, another railway line was opened, between stations Warszawa Aleje Jerozolimskie near Jerusalem Avenue, and Warszawa Okęcie near the airport. Additionally, between 1937 and 1939, a railway line operated between stations in Wyczółki and Paluch.

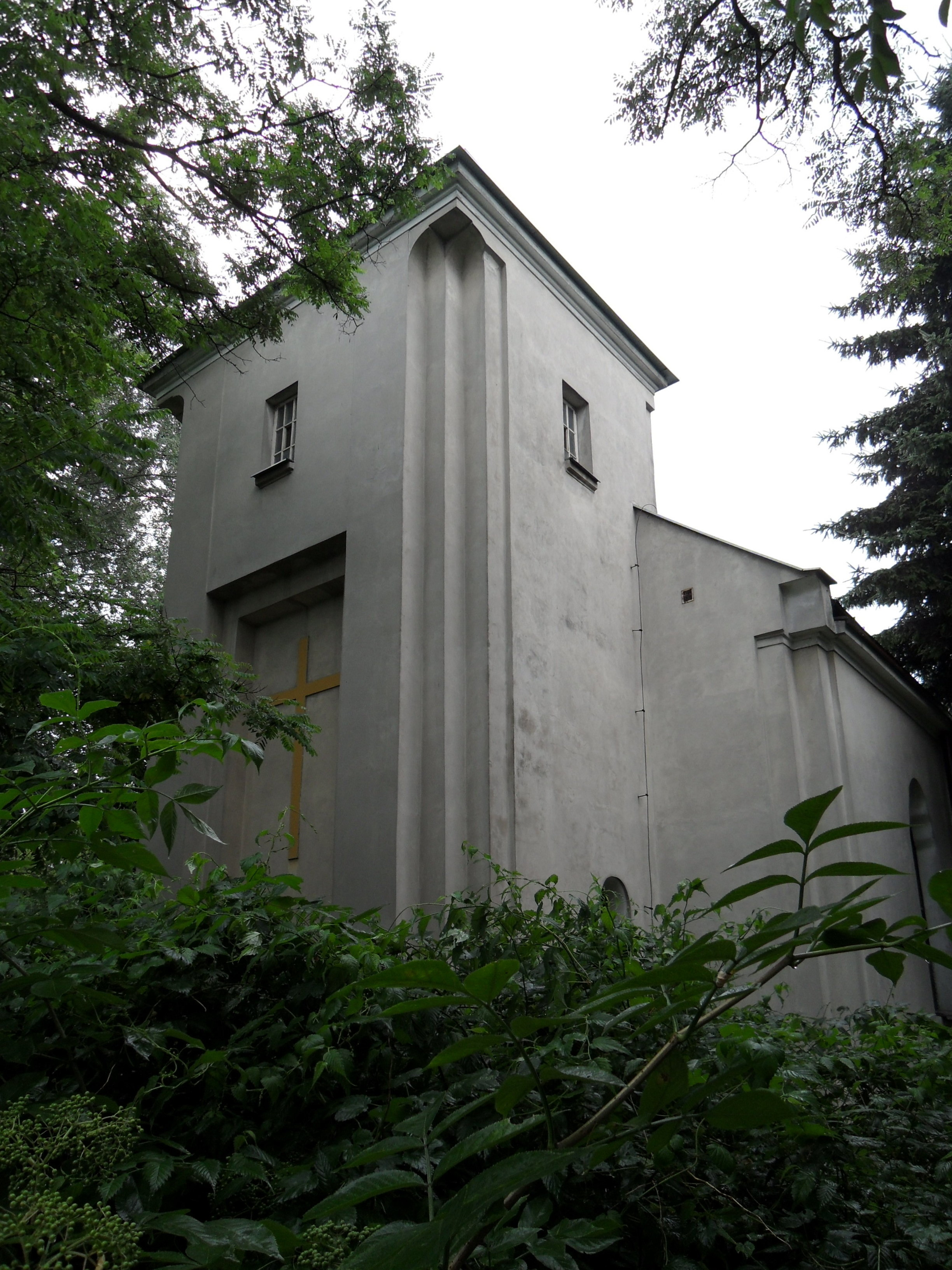
The Church of the Epiphany, built in 1939.

On 15 April 1930, Włochy became the seat of a new municipality, named after it, which also included the village of Solipse, and hamlets of Marianówki and Wiktoryn-Rappówek, as well, as small farming settlements extending from Wiktoryn. In 1933, it was divided into two village assemblies, New Włochy in the north, and Old Włochy, separated by the railway tracks of the Warszawa Włochy station. On 1 April 1939, the municipality was transformed into a town, keeping the name Włochy. It also incorporated some lands from the nearby municipalities of Blizne and Skorosze.

In 1930, a wooden chapel was built in New Włochy, becoming the seat of the Roman Catholic Parish of Saints Teresa of the Child Jesus and the Roman Martyrs in 1934. The same year, the Włochy Cemetery was also founded at the intersection of Ryżowa and Zapusta Streets, to the north of Fort V. The chapel was taken apart in 1957, and later rebuilt in 1959, at a new location, at 46 Popularna Street in Old Włochy. It became the Our Lady of La Salette Church, administered by the Missionaries of La Salette. In 1976, it became the seat of a new parish, and its building was expanded in the 1990s.

In the 1930s, a hamlet, originally known as Opacz, and now as Opacz-Kolonia, was founded to the southwest of Opacz Duża.

On 1 April 1939, Okęcie became the seat of a new municipality, named after it, which also incorporated Opacz Duża, Raków-Kolonia, Salomea, and Załuski. A small portion of Opacz-Kolonia was also incorporated, becoming a new settlement, known as Opacz-Parcela. On the same day, the municipality of Włochy was transformed into a town, keeping the name Włochy. It also incorporated some lands from the nearby municipalities of Blizne and Skorosze.

In 1939, the Church of the Epiphany was opened at 22 Cietrzewia Street in New Włochy, as part of the Evangelical Lutheran Parish of the Holy Trinity. Prior to this, from 1933, the community had a chapel in the Koelichen Palace, and counted around 1,000 members in 1931.

=== Second World War ===
On 1 September 1939, the Warsaw Chopin Airport was bombed by the German Air Force, during the first hours of the German invasion of Poland, which began the Second World War. It, as well as the surrounding area, including the municipalities of Okęcie, Skorosze, and Włochy, were captured on 8 September. Following repairs, the German Air Force begun using the airport. On 12 September, a group of soldiers from the 360th Infantry Regiment of the Polish Armed Forces, led by lieutenant colonel Jakub Chmura, together with two tank companies, attacked German positions in Okęcie. It aimed to identify enemy forces on the western outskirts of Warsaw, destroy German defences and take prisoners. The attack was planned to begin at 3:00 am. However, due to delays with troops arriving at their position, it began at 7:00 am in daylight. Perhaps fearing that, due to the delay, colonel Marian Porwit would call off the attack, Chmura did not give the expected signal, according to which the 2nd Battalion of the 41st Infantry Regiment was to carry out a diversive attack from Ochota, and the heavy artillery was to support the attack on Okęcie. The, unit was divided into three groups. The left wing, commanded by Czesław Chamerski, and supported by half of a tank battalion, captured the Służewiec Racecourse with light German resistance. Then it headed to the Fort VI "Okęcie", being pushed back by heavy fire from fortified German soldiers, eventually retreating at 11:00 am. The Polish side suffered around 80 dead and wounded soldiers, which was around of its 45% forces. The right wing, commanded by Leon Radzikowski and Mieczysław Bułatowicz, headed to Fort M alongside Racławicka Street, where they found a Polish Infantry platoon, which was cut off from communications for three days. Further advance was halted due to enemy fire from Żwirki i Wigury Street. In response, they opened fire from their positions at Racławicka Street, and were eventually ordered to retreat in the evening. The main forces, consisting of two infantry companies and a group of tanks, led by Chmura, captured Zbarż and the airport, pushing back light German resistance. They continued the attack towards Załuski, however, while crossing an empty field, they were fired from both the west and the south, suffering heavy losses, including their commander, Chmura. Around 11:00 am, the Polish forces retreated. In total, all three groups suffered around 280 soldiers being killed, captured, or wounded, and lost 7 tanks. On the same day, the German officers committed their first mass murder against the population of Warsaw. In the early morning hours, a Wehrmacht officer (likely a major) was killed on the Kraków Road. According to one version, he was shot dead by a local, while according to another, the car the officer was travelling in was mistakenly shot down by a German aircraft. After this incident, Wehrmacht soldiers conducted a roundup in Okęcie, capturing several dozen men in nearby houses, and taking them to the courtyard of the factory of Polskie Zakłady Lotnicze, where they were executed. At least 25 people were killed, of whom 11 were identified. One person survived, being mistaken for dead. On 27 September, generals Tadeusz Kutrzeba, and colonel Aleksander Pragłowski, officers of the Polish Armed Forces, met with colonel general Johannes Blaskowitz, the commander of the 8th Army of the Wehrmacht, in the factory of Polskie Zakłady Lotnicze in Okęcie, which served as its command centre. The Polish delegation informed Blaskowitz of the intentions to capitulate the city, and began the negotiations of the terms. Polish military and civilian representatives returned the next day, to finalise the details of the capitulation agreement, which was then signed by Blaskowitz and Kutrzeba, on 13:15, resigning the city to German occupation. On 5 October 1939, Adolf Hitler, the dictator of Germany, arrived by plane at the airport to receive the victory parade in Warsaw.

In 1939, the Okęcie Cemetery was created next to Fort VI, as a burial place for the Polish soldiers fallen during the invasion of Poland, and later in 1944, also those fallen in the Warsaw Uprising. The cemetery was closed down in 1956, and the bodies were exhumated and moved to the Powązki Military Cemetery. On 15 November 1940, a ghetto was created in Fort V "Włochy", repurposing abandoned barracks and small shacks in the area. It housed around 300 Jewish residents, forcibly relocated there from Łomianki, Piastów, Ożarów Mazowiecki, and Włochy. For comparison, before the war, the town had around 100 Jewish inhabitants in 1939. The ghetto had poor living conditions and was closed down in February 1941, with its remaining residents being moved to the Warsaw Ghetto. During its existence, the local government and civilians, led by the mayor Franciszek Kostecki, and the Roman Catholic parish, smuggled around 100 people from the ghetto, giving them new identities with documents made in the town hall. Almost all of those responsible for the operation were arrested on 18 November 1942, and later executed in the Auschwitz concentration camp. Following the arrest, the local Catholic parish, as well as several household owners, continued to help in hiding Jewish people in the town.

During the occupation, the airport was used for cargo transportation, and a new concrete runway was constructed there. A portion of the 1st division of the Air Fleet 6 of the German Air Force, was stationed at the airport, equipped with Junkers Ju 87 dive bomber aircraft. In 1944, the airport also had 56 anti-aircraft guns. Additionally, from 1942 to 1943, the labour camps for Jewish civilian operated in the factories in Okęcie and Raków, later using Soviet prisoners of war in 1944. In 1943, Okęcie had 10,699 inhabitants. On 1 August 1944, at 17:00, codenamed as the W-Hour, a small company of the 7th Infantry Regiment of the Home Army, led by Romuald Jakubowski, attacked the airport. The plans to attack were cancelled an hour prior to the event; however, the group did not receive the new orders in time. The soldiers charged from Zbarż, advancing across an open field, where they came under fierce German machine-gun fire, with Jakubowski dying in the attack. The group was ordered to retreat. However, a German armoured car drove to cut them off, firing at the retreating soldiers. Of the 180 attackers, approximately 120 were killed. The survivors scattered, with a small number successfully travelling to Mokotów. In October 1944, shortly before retreating from the city, German officers damaged the runway and taxiways and destroyed the air traffic control tower. The airport was reopened for civilian use in March 1945.

On 22 November 1939, soldiers of the 7th Legions' Infantry Regiment of the Polish Armed Forces formed an underground resistance group, nicknamed Madagaskar, with their first base of operations in Włochy. The group recruited people from local settlements, mainly from Włochy, Okęcie, Ursus, Ożarów Mazowiecki, Jelonki, and Boernerowo. It trained its members for the military resistance against the occupying forces, later taking the form of the Warsaw Uprising of 1944. The group itself was forced to move out of Włochy, when a secret meeting of its members was discovered by the Gestapo officers on 1 February 1942. Five members of Madagaskar were killed, while all but one of the survivors were arrested. The group was eventually reorganised and reactivated in Boernerowo in October 1942. From 1941, another unit of the Polish resistance, known as the Łużyce Air Base, operated in Włochy and Okęcie. It aimed to provide pilots and personnel for the resistance military, in case it were able to capture an aerodrome in Warsaw. However, following the beginning of the uprising on 1 August 1944, the unit was instead relegated to serve in other operations as part of Garłuch, as the Polish military failed to fulfil original plans. Additionally, from 1943, the Jaworzyn unit also organised several disruptive and sabotage operations in Włochy, such as setting fire to the local town hall on 5 May 1944, leading to half of the German documents being lost in the event.

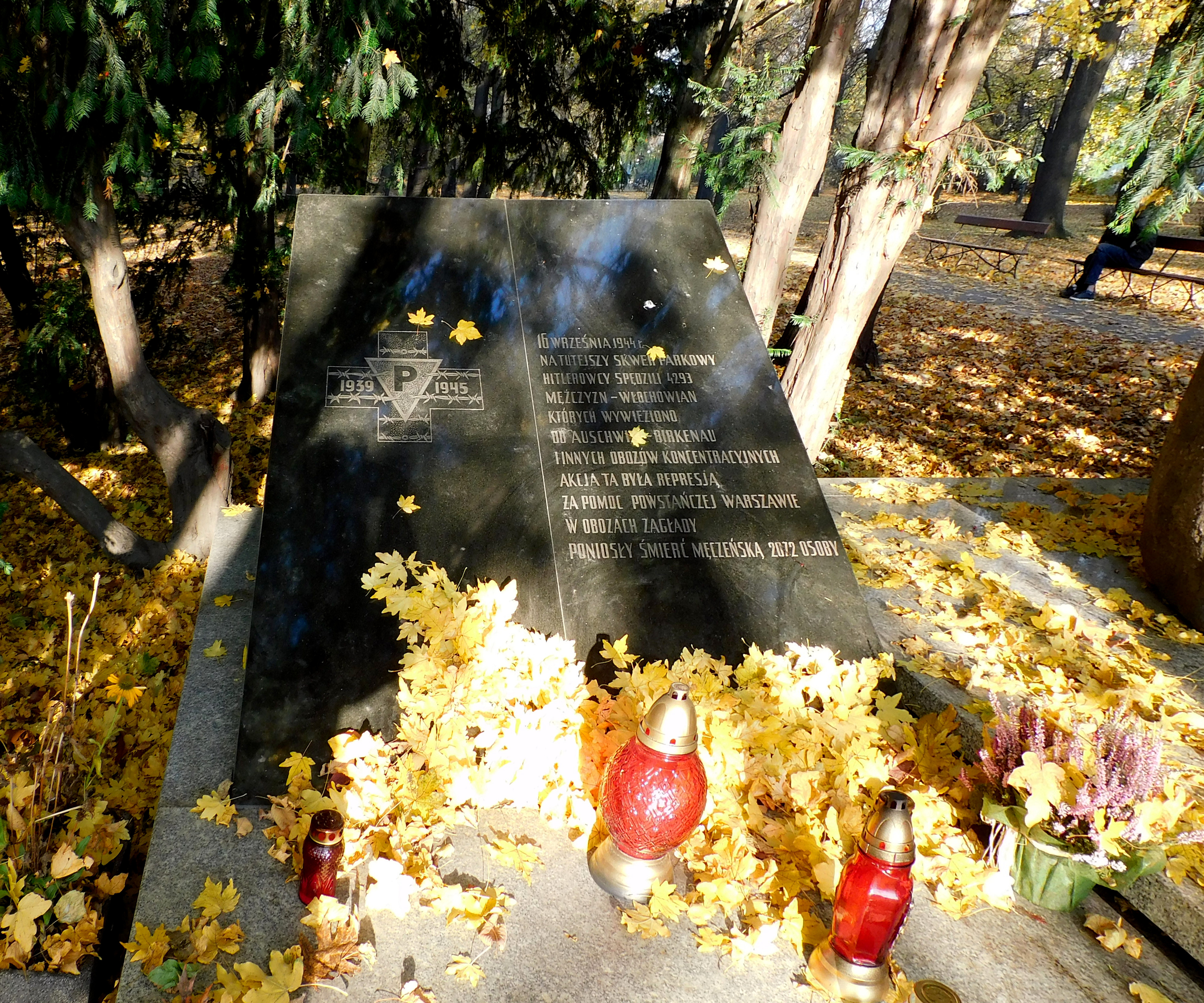
A commemorative plaque, dedicated to people deported from Włochy to the concentration camps on 16 September 1944.

In 1944, the Solipse Cemetery was founded at 1 Na Krańcu Street, to the south of Fort V "Włochy", by the Roman Catholic Parish of St. Joseph the Spouse of Our Lady in Ursus. It was originally predominantly used as a burial ground for the Polish civilian and military casualties during the Warsaw Uprising. On 6 March 1944, six officers of the Home Army were captured in Opacz-Kolonia, and the Volksdeutsche Nazi sympathisers, and executed by the Field Police Corps. In May 1944, a division of the Directorate of Diversion of the Home Army, executed five people responsible for the capture of Polish resistance soldiers, while two more were killed two weeks later.

On 25 August 1944, the German authorities announced in Włochy that men between the ages of 17 and 35 had to report to them, under the pretence of being taken for an "extraordinary work assignment". Around 300 men who came the next day were rounded up and taken first to the Dulag 121 camp in Pruszków, and from there, to the Mauthausen concentration camp in Austria. On 16 September 1944, the authorities rounded up over 4,000 men, mainly from Włochy, with their ages ranging between 16 and 50, or, according to some sources, 55. This constituted almost the entire working-age male population of the town. They were rounded up in Koelichen Park, from where they were taken to the camp in Pruszków. The majority were then sent to other concentration camps to perform forced labour. Around 3,500 were taken by train, while the rest were forced to walk. It is estimated that up to half of the people forcibly taken from the town in August and September died as a result. On 17 January 1945, Włochy and Okęcie were liberated from the occupation by the Polish People's Army.

=== Communist period ===
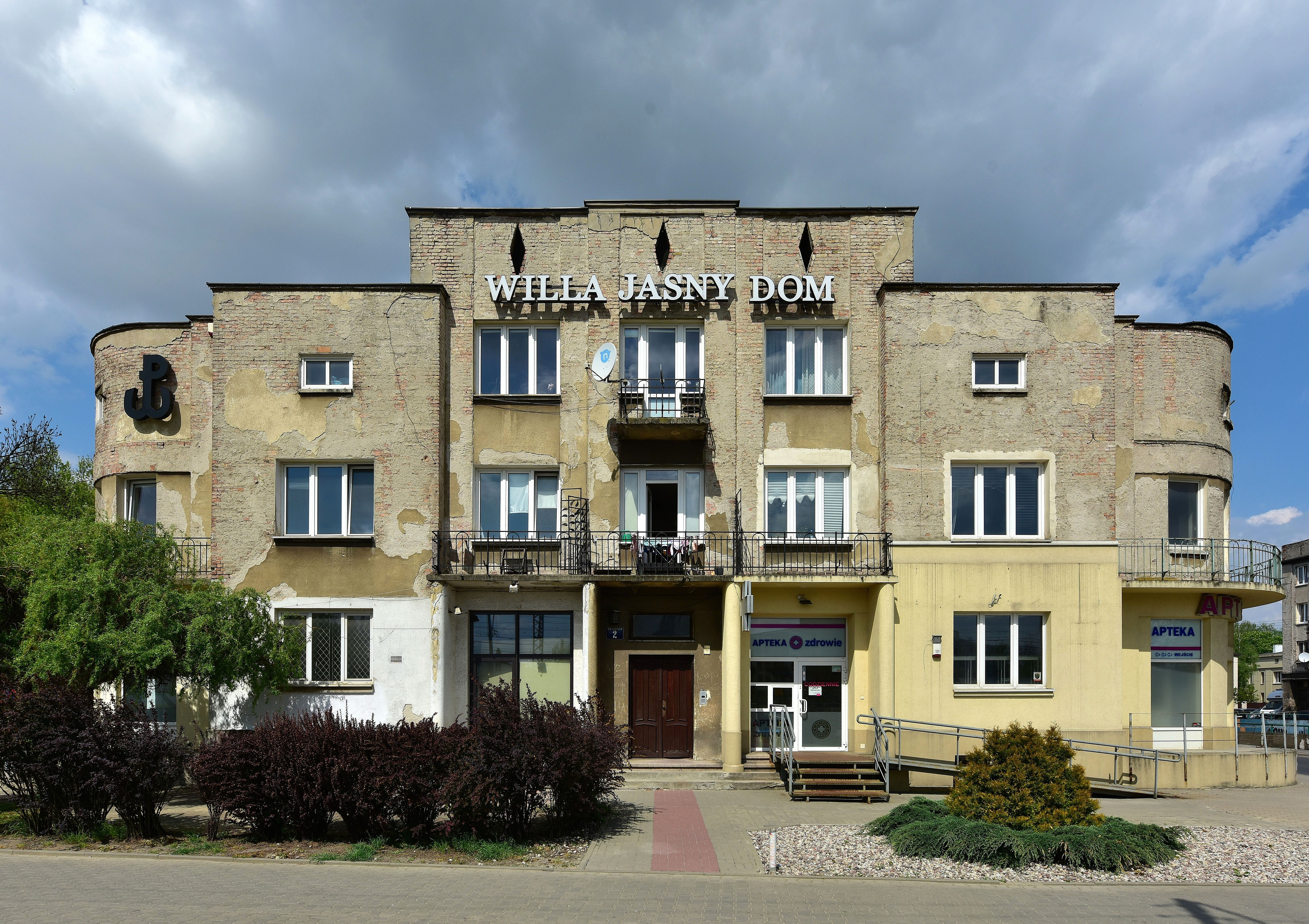
The Bright House villa in Włochy, which, in 1945, served as the arrest of the Main Directorate of Information, the military counterintelligence agency of Poland.

In January 1945, the government confiscated several buildings alongside Cienista Street in New Włochy, which were then given to the military. They became branches of the People's Commissariat for Internal Affairs (NKVD) and the People's Commissariat for State Security (NKGB), two secret police institutions of the Soviet Union. The buildings were used to hold and interrogate people accused of association with, and participation in, the anti-communist resistance and anti-government dissident movement. The interrogations were performed brutally with the frequent use of torture techniques, and several recorded instances of executions. Afterwards, people were sent to the prison camp in Rembertów and the prison at 8 Strzelecka Street in Praga-North, both also operated by the People's Commissariat for Internal Affairs. Additionally, the nearby Bright House, a modernist villa at 2 Świerszcza Street, dating to the 1930s, was used as the arrest of the Main Directorate of Information, the military counterintelligence agency of Poland. Its officers, most of whom came from the People's Commissariat for Internal Affairs, also tortured their arrestees to attain information. Additionally, the buildings in the area of Cienista Street were also used to house soldiers of the Polish People's Army. The Soviet and Polish organisations operated in the area for several months. After their departure, the Security Service set up its local branch nearby, at 26 Globusowa Street, continuing the interrogation practices for another 9 years.

In 1946, Włochy had 18,911 residents. In 1946, the Church of Saints Teresa of the Child Jesus and the Roman Martyrs began its construction the town, located at 27 Rybnicka Street, at the corner with the current Chrościckiego Street. In 1951, the government withdrew its building permit. The parish decided to continue its construction regardless, leading to harassment from the government and the Security Service. The first mass was held inside in 1953, and all services were regularly held there from 1958. The building was officially finished in 1965. It possesses two Baroque paintings by Michael Willmann, dating to around 1700, which were donated to it in 1952.

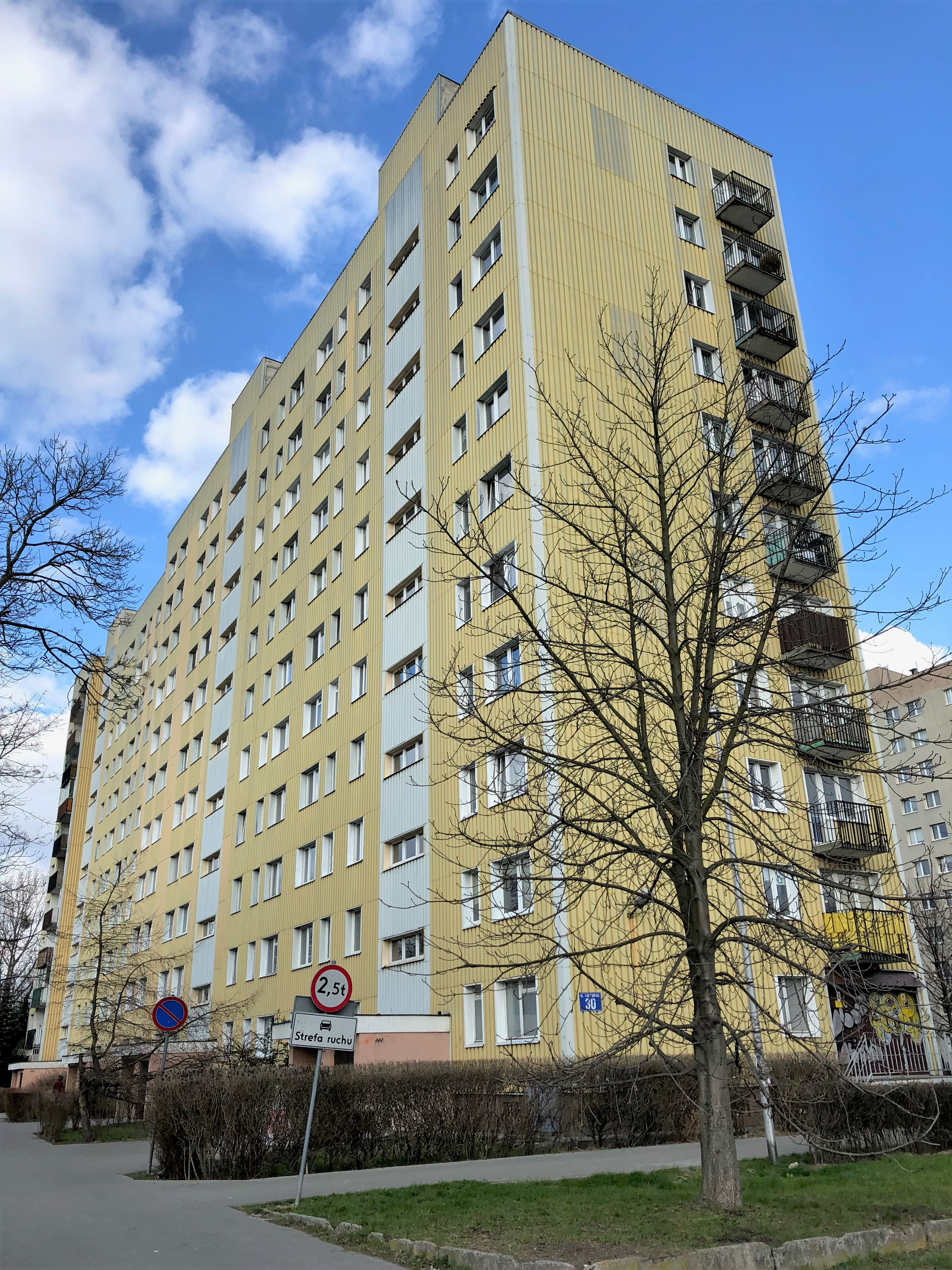
One of the apartment buildings built in the 1980s, in the neighbourhood of Jadwisin.

On 15 May 1951, the town of Włochy, as well as the municipalities of Okęcie and Wilanów, were incorporated into the city of Warsaw, becoming part of the Ochota district. Between 1952 and 1961, the housing estate of Okęcie Lotnisko was developed between Hynka, Żwirki i Wigury, Komitetu Obrony Robotników, and Astronautów Streets, on an area of 12.3 ha. Designed for 6,000 residents, it consisted of multiple 4-storey-tall apartment buildings, constructed using the large panel system technique. The neighbourhood was originally envisioned to house workers of the nearby airport and the aviation industry. Additionally, between 1952 and 1953, three apartment buildings were constructed at the corner of Flia and Łopuszańska Streets, forming the neighbourhood of Okęcie II. Between 1962 and 1972, another housing estate of apartment buildings was developed between Pierwszego Sierpnia Street, Sulmierzycka Street, Lechicka Street, and Krakowska Avenue. Originally named Okęcie-Pola, it was later renamed to Jadwisin. It was developed for around 6,800, with its buildings being built using the large panel system technique. The neighbourhood was further expanded throughout the 1970s and 1980s, with new buildings constructed alongside Pierwszego Sierpnia Street. It also included a small park, later named Marek Kotański Park.

The Warsaw Chopin Airport was expanded between 1962 and 1969, including the construction of an international transport hub, an air traffic control tower, a passenger hall, technical and administrative structures, and cargo and postal infrastructure. Two new main asphalt runways measuring 3000 m (9842.5 ft), as well as an auxiliary runway measuring 2000 m (6561.7 ft), were also developed. One of the main runways was later closed down in the 1970s. The new domestic transport hub was opened in 1975, and a new terminal for arriving passengers was opened in 1978. In 1980, the runways were extended and modernised. In 1992, a new cargo and postal terminal hub was opened. Its construction erased last structures of Gorzkiewki. It was again expanded in 2017, becoming the largest cargo airport terminal in the country.

On 19 December 1962, a Vickers Viscount turboprop airliner operated by LOT Polish Airlines on a flight from Brussels to Warsaw, crashed on landing at the Warsaw Chopin Airport, with all of its 33 passengers and crewmembers dying in the accident. Another major aviation accident in Okęcie took place on 14 March 1980, when a Ilyushin Il-62 jetliner crashed crashed next to the airport and Fort VI, after aborting a landing and attempting to go-around. It was operated on a flight from New York City to Warsaw. All of its 87 passengers and crewmembers died in the accident. It was caused by the disintegration of a turbine disc in one of the plane's engines, leading to uncontained engine failure.

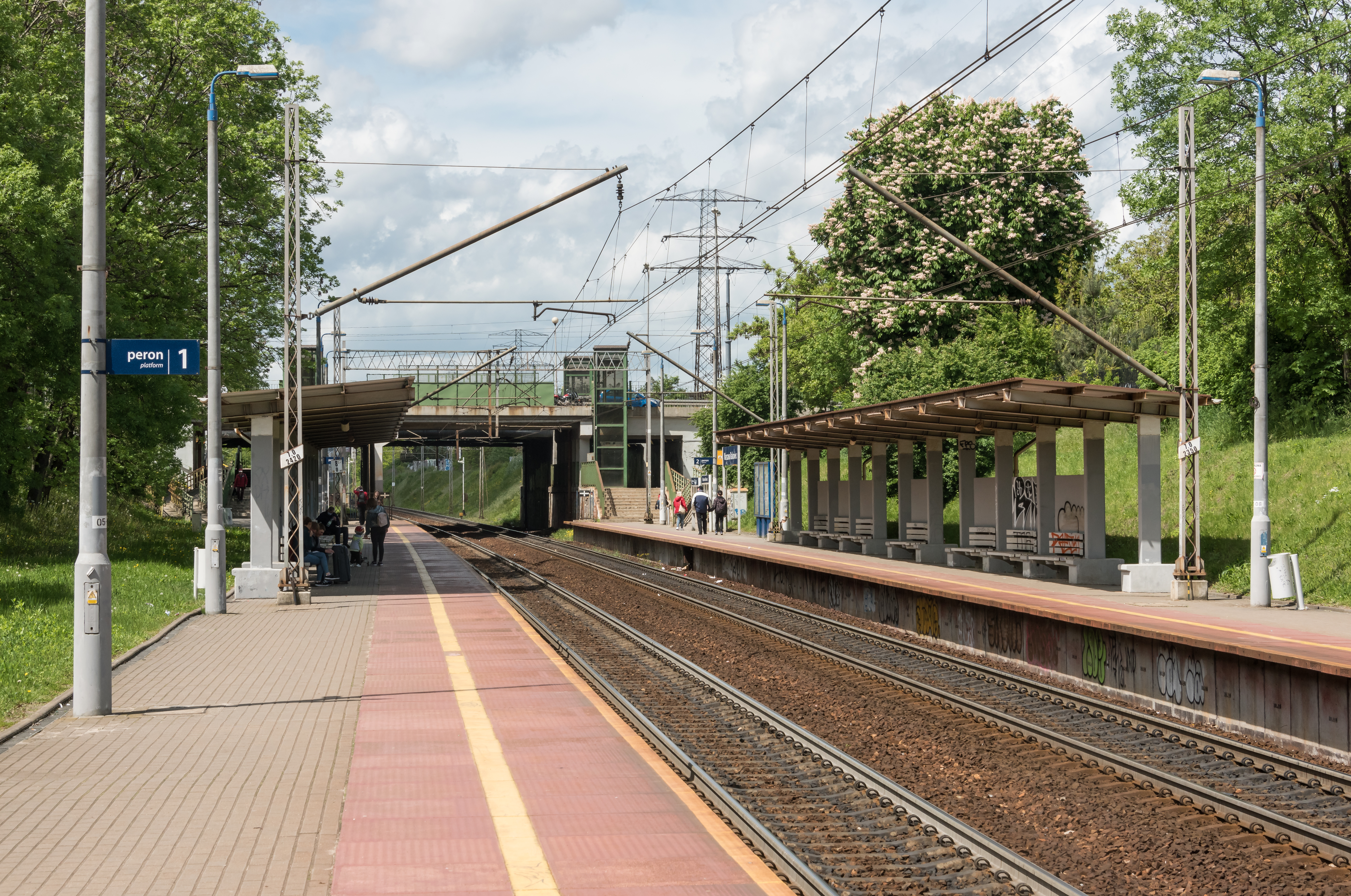
The Warszawa Rakowiec railway station, opened in 1962.

In 1962, two railway stations were opened on a line between Warszawa Aleje Jerozolimskie and Warszawa Okęcie, including Warszawa Służewiec at Logarytmiczna Street, and Warszawa Rakowiec at Grójecka Street. They formed part of the railway line between Warsaw West and Kraków Main.

In 1971, the Warszawa Ursus Północny railway station was opened between Cykady and Szamoty Streets, as part of the line between stations Warsaw West and Kunowice. In 1973, Jerusalem Avenue, one of the main streets of the city, was extended from the downtown to the intersection with Łopuszańska Street in Old Włochy and Raków. The same year, the Kleszczowa bus garage was also opened at 28 Kleszczowa Street in Salomea. Between 1979 and 1987, the Catholic Church of Our Lady of Loreto was built at 4A Hynka Street. The building also began operating the Okęcie Cemetery, which was reopened in 1990. With an area of 0.3 ha, it is currently one of the largest burial grounds in the city. On 3 August 1987, around 15:30, two passenger trains collided at the Warszawa Włochy station, leading to 8 people dying, and over 30 being injured, of whom 8 later died in hospital. Around 2.5 hours earlier, two trams also collided in the city's district of Wola, at the crossing of Młynarska and Wolska Streets, with 7 people dying, and 76 being injured. Due to both tragedies, the date became known as the "Black Thursday of Warsaw Transit". The city observed 4 August as a day of mourning.

=== Democratic period ===
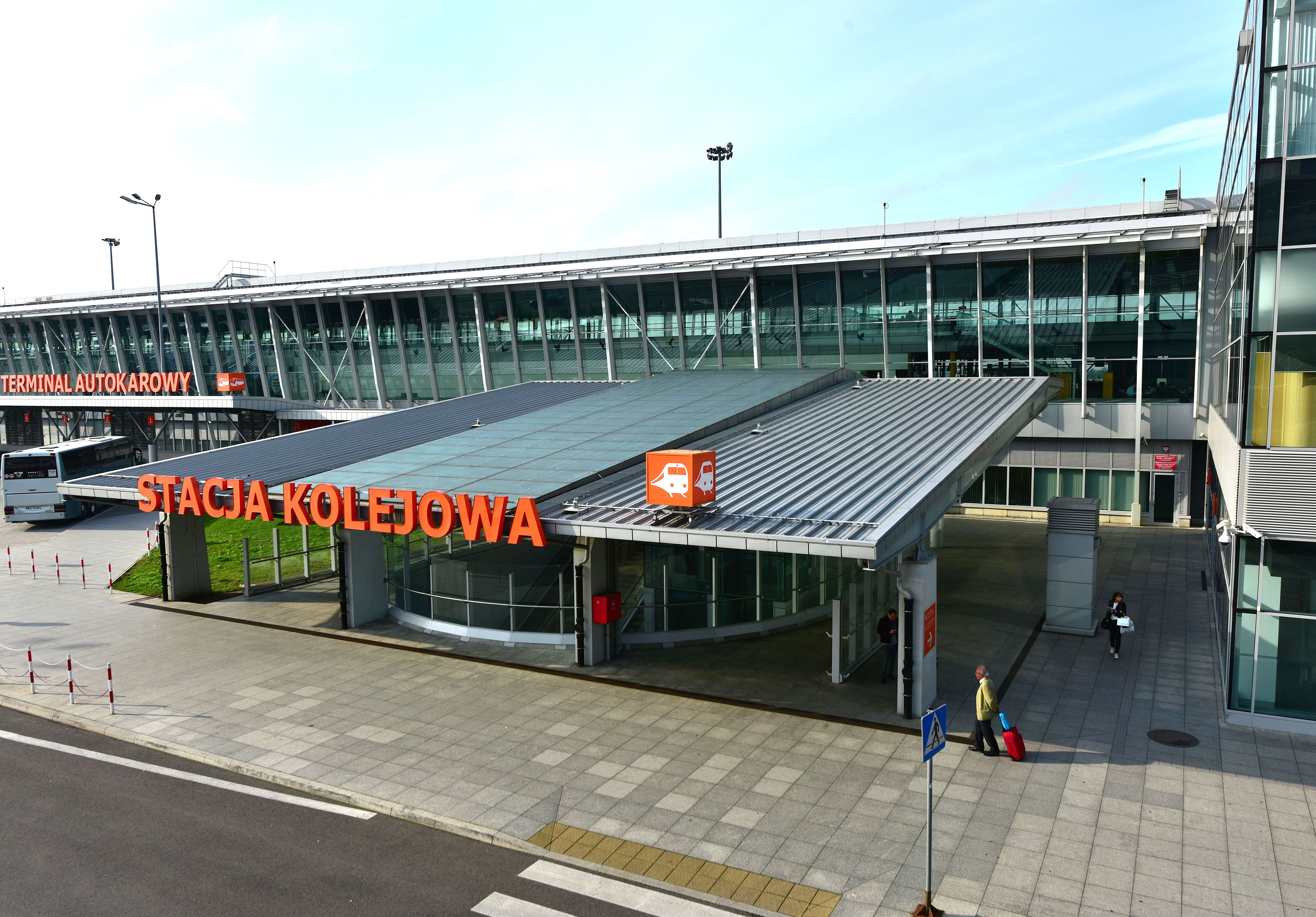
The Warsaw Chopin Airport railway station, opened in 2008.

On 29 December 1989, following an administrative reform in the city, the area became part of the municipality of Warsaw-Ochota, and on 25 March 1994, the area, including Okęcie, Opacz Wielka, Raków, Salomea, Włochy, and Załuski, was separated, forming a new municipality, named Warsaw-Włochy. In 2000, following an extensive renovation, expansion, and modernisation process, an abandoned office building at 257 Krakowska Avenue in Raków was adopted to house the municipal town hall. On 27 October 2002, the municipality was restructured into the city district of Włochy. On 19 May 2004, it was subdivided into eight City Information System areas.

In 1998, the Helena Chodkowska University of Technology and Economics (originally known as the Higher School of Management and Marketing) was founded at 135 Jutrzenki Street in Old Włochy, operating as a private university. Between 1997 and 2000, a small housing estate of apartment buildings, known as Wieża, was developed at the corner of Lechicka and Radarowa Streets. In 2008, the Warszawa Żwirki i Wigury was opened near Żwirki and Wigury Street, between stations Warszawa Służewiec and Warszawa Rakowiec. In 2012, the Warsaw Chopin Airport railway station was opened in the airport complex, forming a separate branch line.

Between 2010 and 2013, two intersecting expressways were constructed passing through Opacz Wielka, forming a part of a ring road around Warsaw, including Salomea–Wolica Route on a west-east axis, the Expressway S2 on a north-south axis. In 2015, the Centrum Łopuszańska 22 shopping mall was opened at 22 Łopuszańska Street in Raków. In 2018, the Saint George the Victorious Church, a Polish Orthodox cathedral was opened at 2 Hynka Street in Raków. In 2019, the Space Gardens, a small urban park with an area of around 3 ha, was opened at the intersection of Plastyczna and Sympatyczna Streets in New Włochy. Throughout 2010s and 2020s, several more housing estates of apartment buildings development in Raków, in place of warehouses and factories.

== Government ==
=== Mayor and district council ===
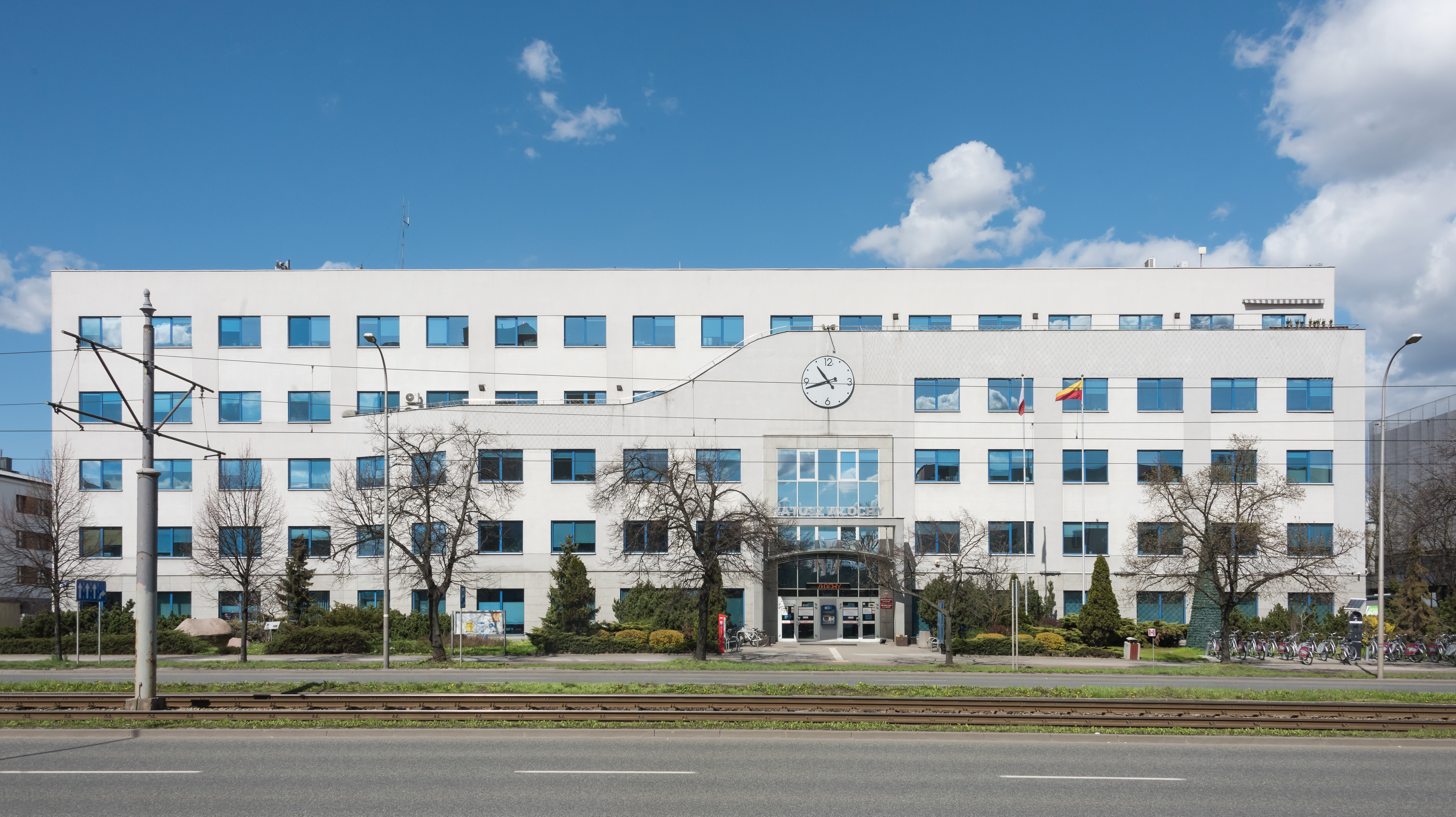
The Włochy Town Hall.

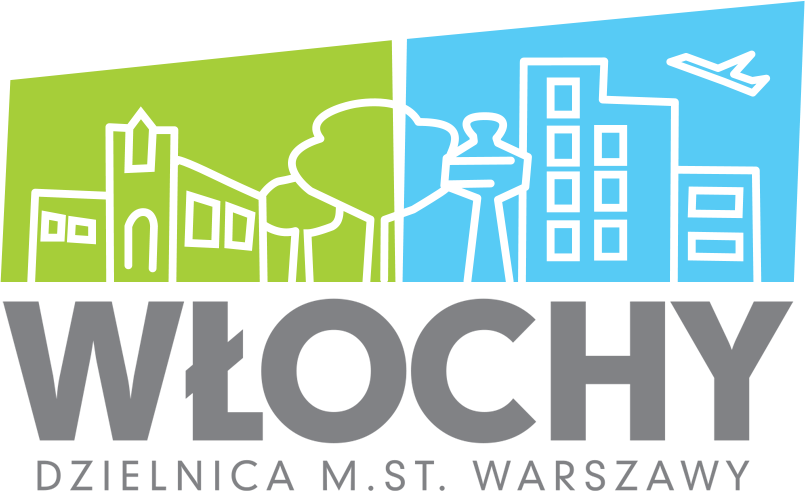
Logo of Włochy from 2017 to 2023.

Włochy is one of eighteen districts of the city of Warsaw. Its seat is located at 257 Krakowska Avenue. The government is divided into two branches: the management board as the executive branch, and an elected council with 21 members, as the legislative and regulatory branch. It is led by the mayor (Polish: burmistrz). Since 1994, the office has been held by:

- 1994–1998: Leszek Kaczyński;
- 1998–2003: Krzysztof Brzózka;
- 2003–2004: Elżbieta Paziewska;
- 2004–2005: Jacek Dżugaj;
- 2005–2006: Dariusz Seliga;
- 2006–2018: Michał Wąsowicz;
- 2018–2019: Artur Wołczacki;
- 2019–present: Jarosław Karcz.

District council membership
| Party | 2002–2006 | 2006–2010 | 2010–2014 | 2014–2018 | 2018–2024 | 2024–2029 |
|---|---|---|---|---|---|---|
| Civic Coalition | —N/a | —N/a | —N/a | —N/a | 9 | 11 |
| Civic Platform | 2 | 8 | 6 | 6 | —N/a | —N/a |
| Community 2002 | 8 | —N/a | —N/a | —N/a | —N/a | —N/a |
| Democratic Left Alliance and Labour Union | 3 | —N/a | —N/a | —N/a | —N/a | —N/a |
| I Love Włochy | —N/a | —N/a | —N/a | —N/a | 4 | —N/a |
| Law and Justice | 6 | 7 | 6 | 9 | 5 | 4 |
| League of Polish Families | 1 | —N/a | —N/a | —N/a | —N/a | —N/a |
| Left and Democrats | —N/a | 1 | —N/a | —N/a | —N/a | —N/a |
| Third Way | —N/a | —N/a | —N/a | —N/a | —N/a | 1 |
| Together for Poland | 1 | —N/a | —N/a | —N/a | —N/a | —N/a |
| Włochy District Community | —N/a | 5 | 7 | 5 | —N/a | —N/a |
| Włochy District Residents' Association | —N/a | —N/a | —N/a | —N/a | 3 | 5 |
| Włochy Neighbourhood Assosiation | —N/a | —N/a | 1 | 1 | —N/a | —N/a |

=== Subdivisions ===
The subdivision of Włochy into the areas of the City Information System.

Włochy is subdivided eight areas of the City Information System, a municipal standardised system of street signage. They are:

- New Włochy;
- Okęcie;
- Old Włochy;
- Opacz Wielka;
- Paluch;
- Raków;
- Salomea;
- Załuski.

== Demographics ==
=== Population ===
In 2024, Włochy had a population of 50,753 people, making up around 2.7% of the city residents. In contrast with previous years, its population has increased from 43,613 in 2020, 37,872 in 2010, and 35,946 in 1994. In 2023, the majority of the population was in the working age of between 18 and 64, with 32,513 people, or 64.8%. A total of 9,810 people, or 19.6%, were under the age of 18, while 7,820, or 15.6%, were over 65. Włochy has an area of 28.63 km^{2} (11.05 sq mi), making up around 5.5% of the city. In 2024, it had the population density of 1,773 people per km^{2} (4,591 people per sq mi). Włochy is 16th in the city by both population and area, making it its 3rd smallest district by both metrics.

Historical population
| Year | 1950 | 1960 | 1970 | 1978 | 1988 | 1994 | 2002 | 2005 | 2010 | 2020 | 2021 | 2023 | 2024 |
| Pop. | 43,051 | 44,701 | 37,368 | 39,216 | 35,535 | 35,946 | 39,176 | 39,774 | 37,872 | 43,613 | 48,919 | 50,143 | 50,753 |
| ±% | — | +3.8% | −16.4% | +4.9% | −9.4% | +1.2% | +9.0% | +1.5% | −4.8% | +15.2% | +12.2% | +2.5% | +1.2% |

=== Religion and cemeteries ===
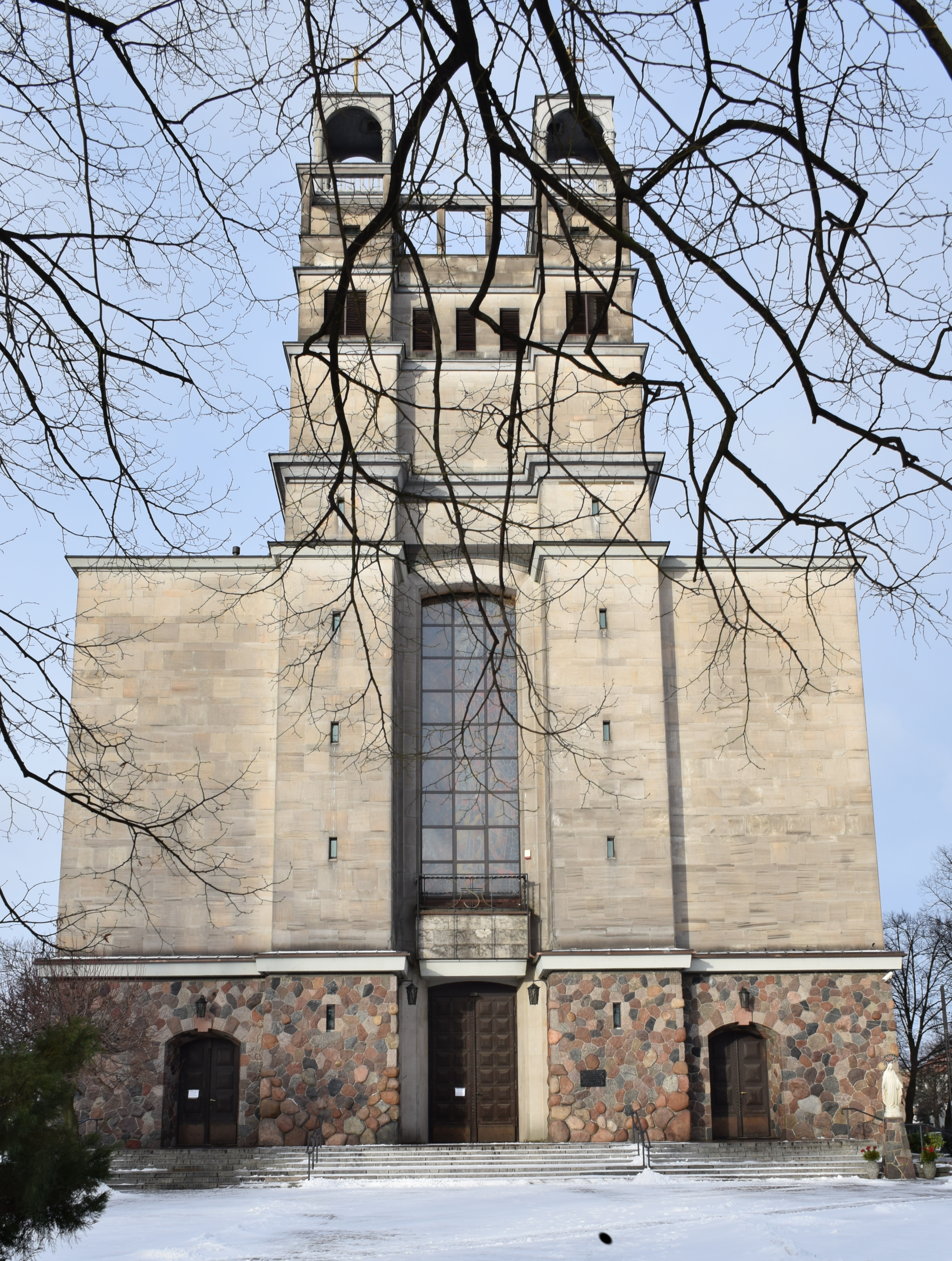
The Church of Saints Teresa of the Child Jesus and the Roman Martyrs in New Włochy.

The district features three Roman Catholic churches, including: Church of Saints Teresa of the Child Jesus and the Roman Martyrs, Our Lady of La Salette Church, and Our Lady of Loreto Church. The first of them, completed in 1965, includes two baroque paintings by Michael Willmann, dating to around 1700, which were donated to it in 1952. Włochy also has the Saint George the Victorious Church, a Polish Orthodox cathedral, the Church of Epiphany, which belongs to the Lutheran Evangelical denomination, as part of the Parish of the Holy Trinity, and the Kingdom Hall of Jehovah's Witnesses at 17 Krakowiaków Street.

The district also has three cemeteries, including the Okęcie Cemetery, located on Leonidasa Street, which, with an area of 0.3 ha, is one of the largest burial grounds in Warsaw. The other two are Włochy Cemetery and Solipse Cemetery, placed around Fort V "Włochy".

== Housing and economy ==
The Włochy district is predominantly a residential area featuring low-rise single-family housing, with lesser presence of apartment buildings. It includes neighbourhoods such Włochy in the northwest, as well as Okęcie, Opacz Wielka, and Załuski, Warsaw in the central south. The area of northeast is dominated by several housing estates with mid-rise apartment buildings, including Jadwisin, Okęcie Lotnisko, Raków, and Salomea.

Additionally, the area in the south central portion of the district includes numerous factories and warehouses, especially in the vicinity of the Warsaw Chopin Airport. Włochy also features shopping malls such as Centrum Łopuszańska 22 at 22 Łopuszańska Street in Raków, and Okęcie Park at 61 Krakowska Avenue in Załuski.

== Higher education and science ==
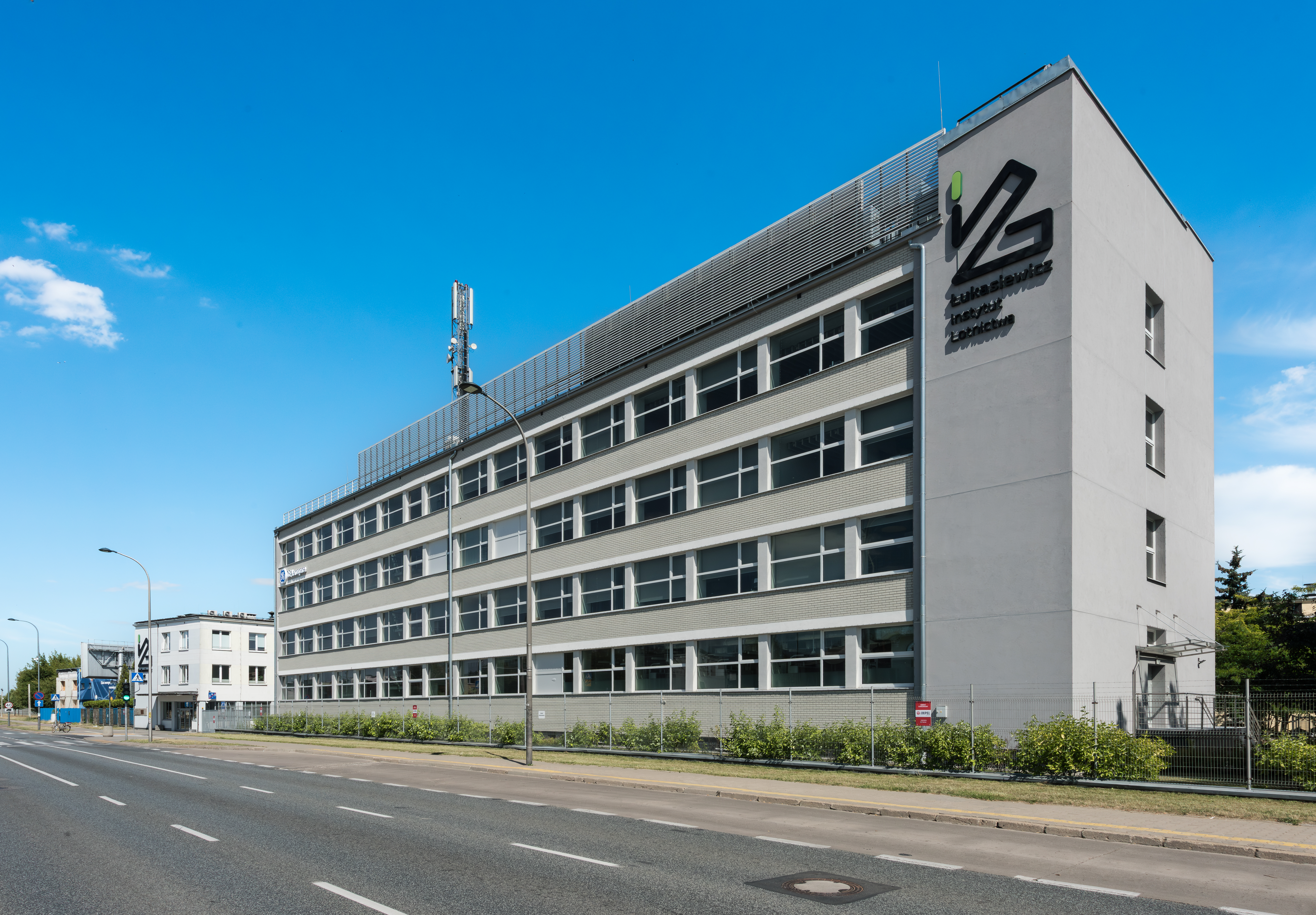
The Institute of Aviation.

Włochy features the Institute of Aviation located at 110 and 114 Krakowska Avenue, near the Warsaw Chopin Airport. It is a state-owned research institution, which forms a part of the Łukasiewicz Research Network. It specialises in the aviation and astronautics research, including the aerodynamics, aircraft engine design, and aircraft structure and materials development. The city district also includes the Helena Chodkowska University of Technology and Economics, which operates as a private university, and is located at 135 Jutrzenki Street in Stare Włochu.

== Culture ==
The district of Włochy features two historic manor houses, including the Koelichen Palace, built in neoclassical style in 1859, and now functioning as a public library. Its located at 2 Chrościckiego Street, and surrounded by the Combatants Park. The other one is historic manor house built for the Schneider family in 1888, located at 11 Pierwszego Sierpnia Street. Furthermore, the district features three historical retired military fortifications, dating to 1888, including Fort V "Włochy", currently used as a park area, as well as Forts VI "Okęcie" and VII "Zbarż", which currently stand as abandoned ruins.

== Parks, nature, and recreation ==
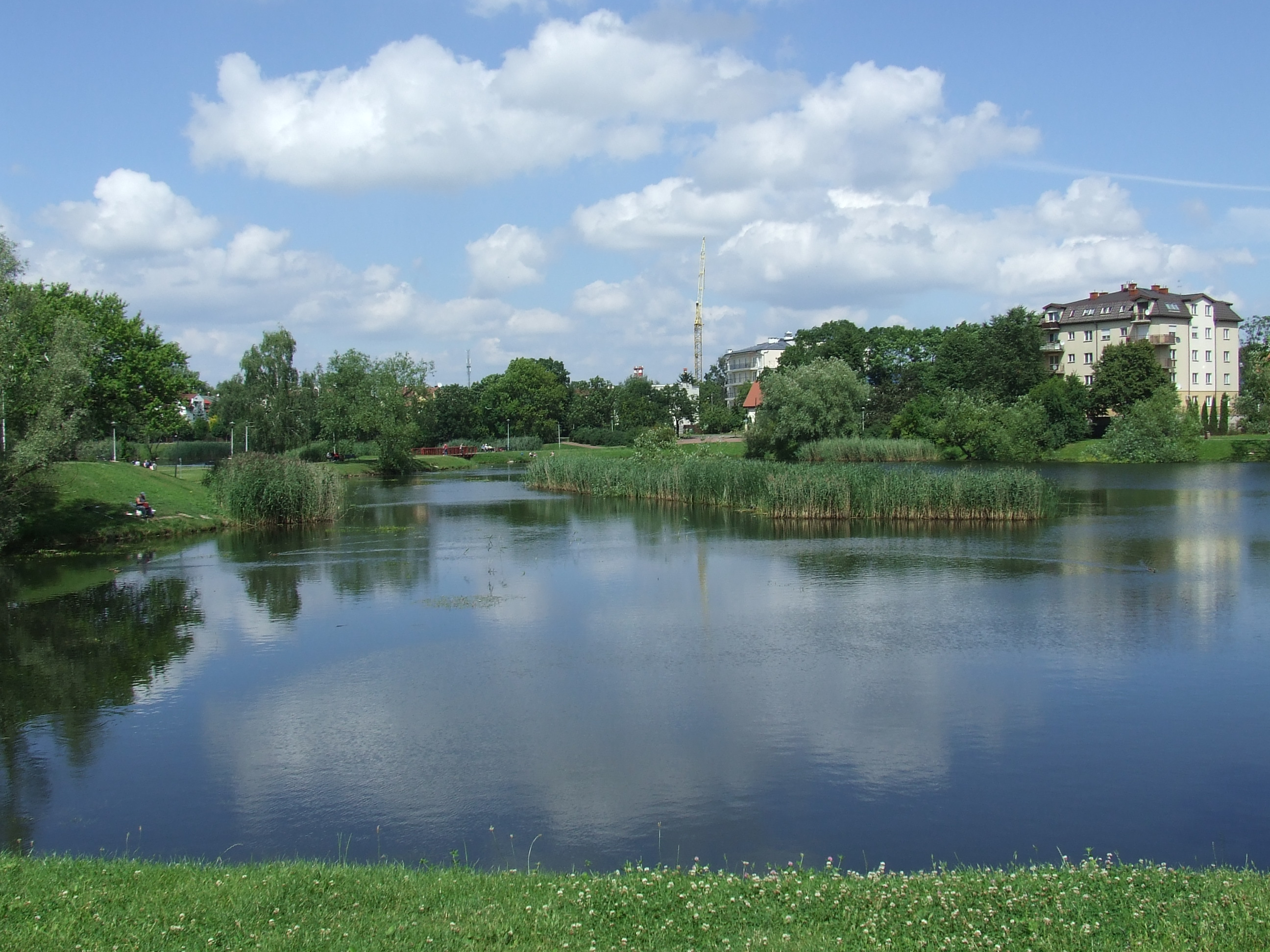
The Goat Pond in New Włochy.

The district features several urban parks. Among them is the Combatants Park, located within the Włochy, which features the Koelichen Palace, a historical neoclassical residence from 1859, currently functioning as a public library. Other parks in the area include the Black Grouse Ponds Park and the Goat Pond Park, centred around their titular lakes, as well as the Space Gardens. Furthermore, the district also features the Marek Kotański Park in the neighbourhood of Jadwisin, as well as several garden squares, such as the Freedom Square and the Sixteenth of September 1944 Square in New Włochy. Additionally, several other small ponds area present in the area, such as Faience Clay Pits in Raków, Warsaw, Załuski Clay Pits in Opacz Wielka, and Zbarż Pond in Okęcie. Furthermore, Fort V "Włochy", a retired historical fortification dating to 1888, located within the neighbourhood of Włochy, forms a green park area.

The district also includes sports clubs and their facilities, such as Przyszłość Włochy and Okęcie Warsaw, based at 25 Rybnicka Street and 1 Radarowa Street, respectively.

== Transport ==
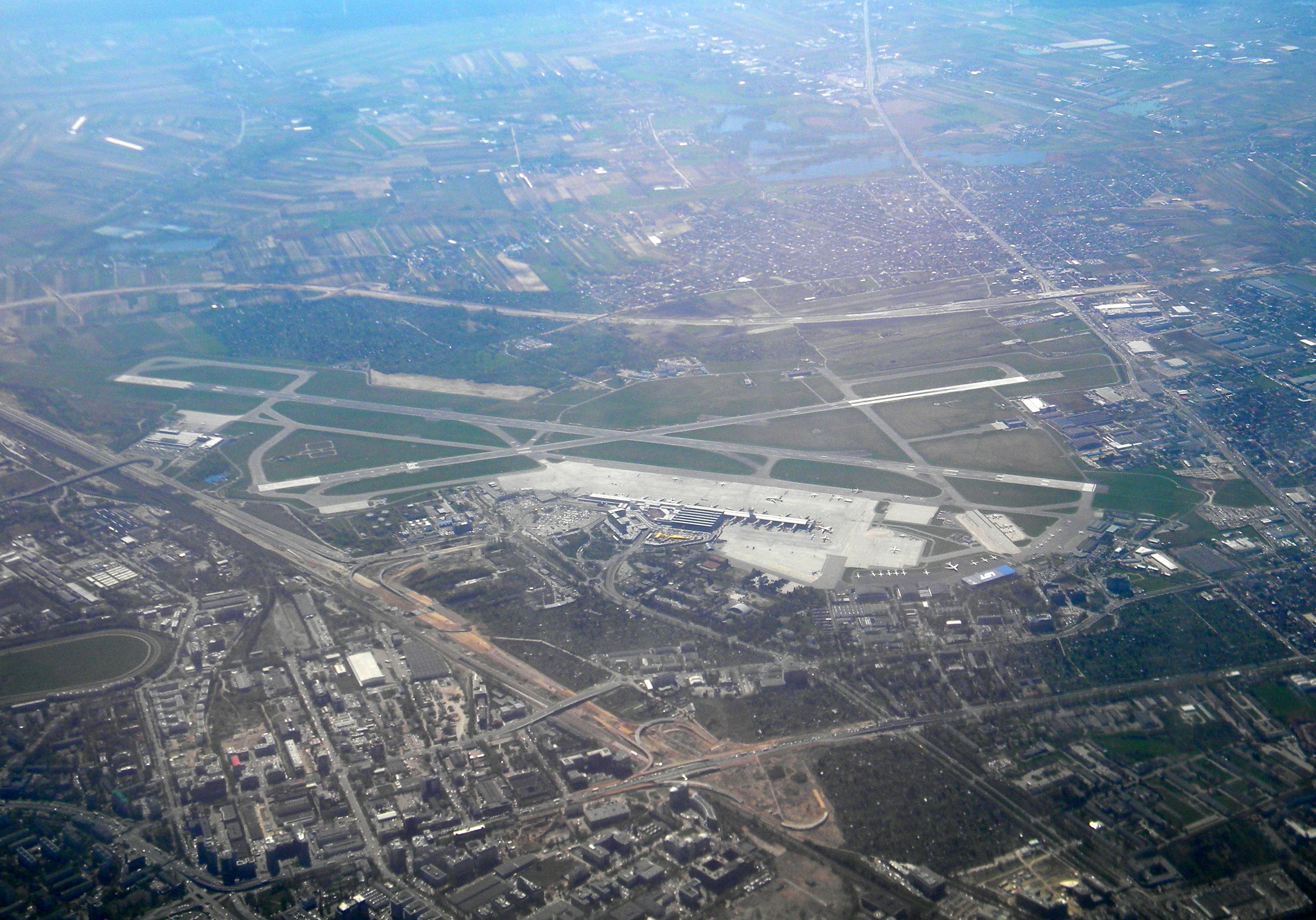
The aerial view of Warsaw Chopin Airport.

The southeastern area of the district features Warsaw Chopin Airport, which, in 2024, it was the busiest airport in Poland and the 28th busiest airport in Europe, with 21.3 million passengers in 2024, handling approximately 40% of the country's total air passenger traffic. It forms a central hub for LOT Polish Airlines as well as a base for Enter Air and Wizz Air. The airport includes two intersecting asphalt runways, with lengths of 3,690 m (12,106 ft) and 2,800 m (9,186 ft), respectively, as well as two passenger terminals, a cargo terminal, and a dedicated railway station.

The district includes several more railway stations. A portion of its northern and eastern boundaries is marked by the railway tracks of the line between Warsaw West and Kraków Main, which include stations Warszawa Aleje Jerozolimskie, Warszawa Żwirki i Wigury, Warszawa Służewiec, Warszawa Rakowiec, and Warszawa Okęcie. In its northwestern portion are also present stations Warszawa Raków, Warszawa Salomea, Warszawa Ursus Północny, and Warszawa Włochy. Włochy is also crossed by a tram line, connecting it to the Downtown. The track were placed alongside Krakowska Avenue, with a turning loop at the intersection of current Malowicza Street and Krakowska Avenue. Additionally, the district also includes the Kleszczowa bus garage at 28 Kleszczowa Street in Salomea.

Włochy is also passed through by two intersecting expressways located in its south, including Salomea–Wolica Route on a west-east axis, the Expressway S2 on a north-south axis.

== Symbols ==
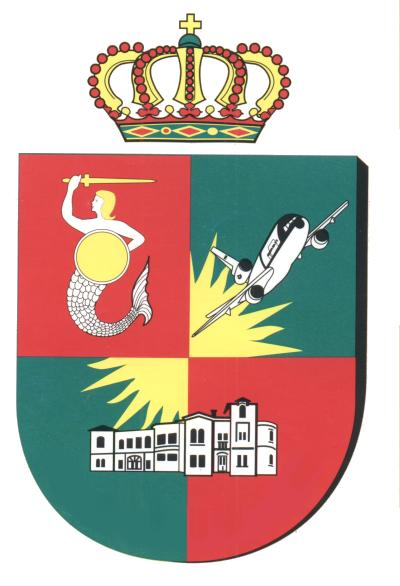
The coat of arms of Włochy.

The coat of arms of Włochy was adopted on 16 February 1996. It consists of a French-style escutcheon (shield) divided into four fields of equal height and length, distributed in two columns. They alter between red and green, with the latter used for top left and bottom right fields, from the viewer's point of view. The top left field depicts the Mermaid of Warsaw, a traditional symbol of the city, taking form of a naked adult woman with white (silver) skin, with a white fish tail instead of legs. She has yellow (golden) middle-lengthen hair, and holds a yellow sword in her left, risen above her head, and a yellow shield with thin white rim, held in front of her stomach and chest. She is facing to her right. The top left field depicts a white the McDonnell Douglas MD-11 trijet wide-body airliner, with black details, and three turbojets, two at its wings, and one on its tail. Its faring sharply to the up, with its wings tilted down to the right. Two bottom fields jointly depict the Kolichen Palace, a 19th-century neoclassical palace in the district, in form of a white long building, with black details including windows and roofs. The shield also features a large yellow 30-pointed star, with alternating longer straight and shorter waved arms. Its partially obscured by red fields, only being shown on green fields, behind other elements depicted on them. Above the shield is placed a yellow hoop crown with five hoops on its front side, decorated with red spherical jewels, and topped with a small Christian cross, placed on a green sphere. The base of the crown is red, decorated with red clovers on its top, and a green band along its side, with yellow stipes on its top and bottom, and three long and thin green rhombs with yellow rims, and separated from each other with small green circles with yellow rims. The crown is separated from the coat of arms leaving an empty space between them.
