= Opacz Mała =

- Village
- Location within Poland
- Coordinates: 52°10′N 20°54′E
- Country: Poland
- Voivodeship: Masovian
- County: Pruszków
- Gmina: Michałowice

Opacz Mała [ˈɔpat͡ʂ ˈmawa] is a village in the administrative district of Gmina Michałowice, within Pruszków County, Masovian Voivodeship, in east-central Poland.
