= Koelichen Palace =

Neoclassical palace in Warsaw, Poland

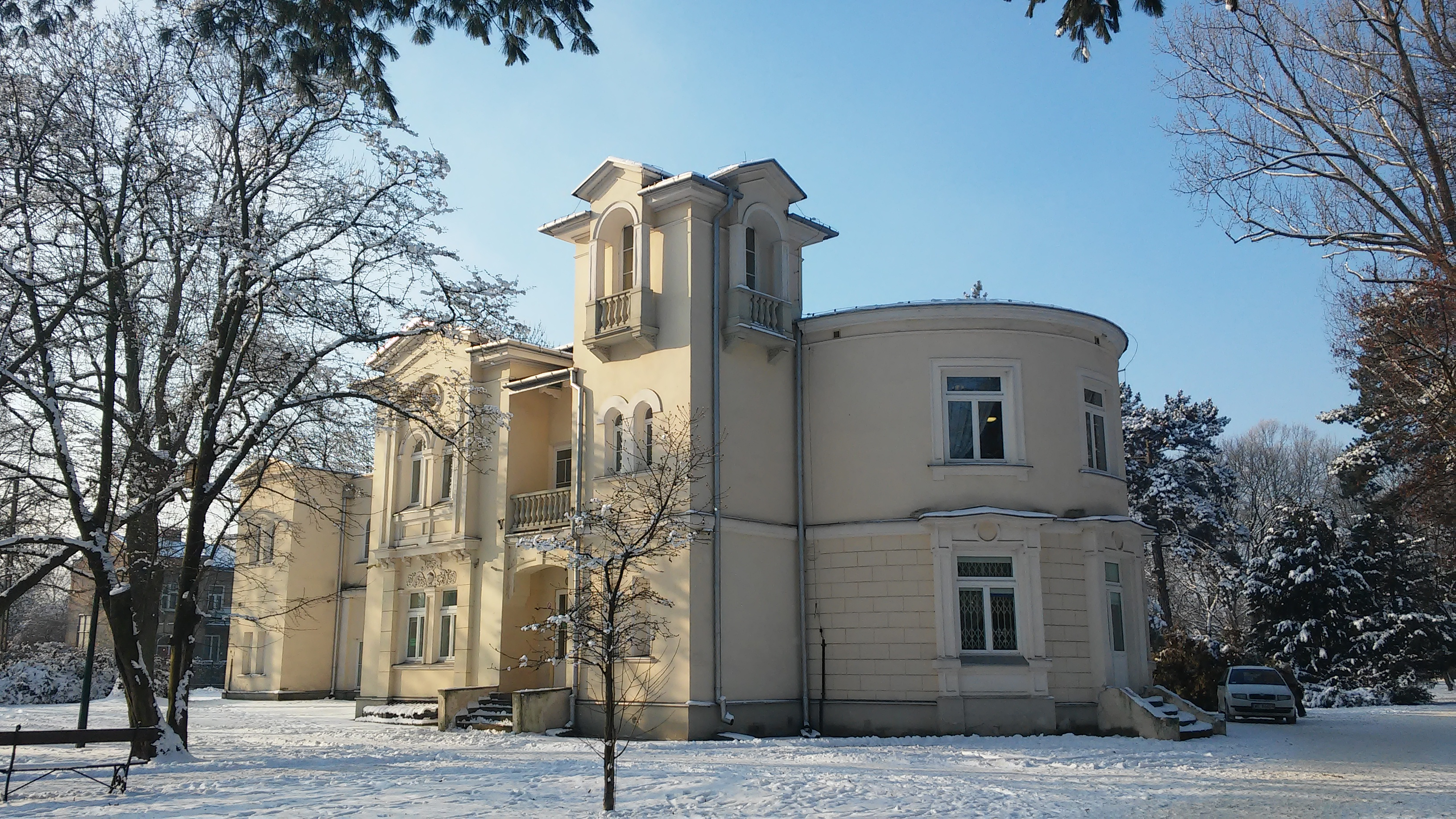
- The palace in 2016.

General information
- Architectural style: Neoclassical
- Location: 2 Chrościckiego Street, Włochy, Warsaw, Poland
- Coordinates: 52°12′23.99″N 20°54′43.57″E
- Completed: 1859

Technical details
- Floor count: 3

The Koelichen Palace (Polish pronunciation: [kɔ.ɛˈli.xɛn]; Polish: Pałac Koelichenów) is a neoclassical palace in Warsaw, Poland, located within the Włochy district, at 2 Chrościckiego Street, and surrounded by the Combatants Park. The building has three storeys. It was designed by architect Aleksander Zabierzowski, and built in 1859, as the residence for the Koelichen family. It currently houses a public library.

== History ==
In the first half of the 17th century, the landed estate of Włochy was acquired by Andrzej Leszczyński, the Grand Chancellor of the Crown and the primate of Poland, who built there his manor house around 1650. In 1671, it was used as a hideout by Ulrich von Werdum, one of the organisers of a magnate opposition, attempting to nullify the election of Michał Korybut Wiśniowiecki as the king of Poland and Grand Duke of Lithuania. In 1794, the area was also used by Frederick William II, the king of Prussia and Elector of Brandenburg, as his headquarters during the siege of Warsaw. The manor, as well as the village of Witki, were burned down by the Swedish army in 1656, during the Second Northern War, and its area eventually became part of Włochy. The nearby Stojarty was also recorded for the last time in the 17th century. In 1794, the area was also used by Frederick William II, the king of Prussia and Elector of Brandenburg, as his headquarters during the siege of Warsaw.

In 1795, the estate of Włochy was acquired by count Tadeusz Antoni Mostowski, a politician and statesman, who later would become the minister of interior of the Duchy of Warsaw, and the president of the Government Committee of the Interior of the Kingdom of Poland. Around 1800, he founded his residence there and developed a park around it, the later being designed by A. Szubert. In 1842, they were redeveloped as a neoclassical palace and an English landscape garden, respectively. The later was redesigned by an English gardener F. James. The estate was acquired in 1844 by entrepreneur Andrzej Koelichen. The residence was again rebuilt in 1859, with a design by architect Aleksander Zabienowski, and became known as Koelichen Palace. The palace and the garden remained the property of the Koelichen family until 1939.

In 1928, as the nearby area was developed into a residential neighbourhood with villa houses, the garden around the Koelichen Palace was opened to the public as a recreational urban space, known as the Combatants Park. From 1933, the Koelichen Palace housed a chapel of the local community of the Evangelical Church of the Augsburg Confession, until its new temple, the Church of the Epiphany was opened. In 1931, the community had around 1,000 members. In 1936, a library owned by the Property Owners Association was opened in the palace.

On 16 September 1944, while the area was under the German occupation during the Second World War, the authorities rounded up over 4,000 men, mainly from Włochy, with their ages ranging between 16 and 50, or, according to some sources, 55. This constituted almost the entire working-age male population of the town. They were rounded up in the Combatants Park, from where they were taken to the camp in Pruszków. The majority were then sent to other concentration camps to perform forced labour. Around 3,500 were taken by train, while the rest were forced to walk. It is estimated that up to half of the people forcibly taken from the town in August and September died as a result. On 17 January 1945, Włochy and Okęcie were liberated from the occupation by the Polish People's Army.

The building was renovated and restored after the end of the Second World War. The library was reopened in the palace in 1947, being operated by the local municipal government. In 1965, it received the status of a protected cultural property.

Since 1996, the palace is depicted on the coat of arms of the Włochy district.

== Gallery ==
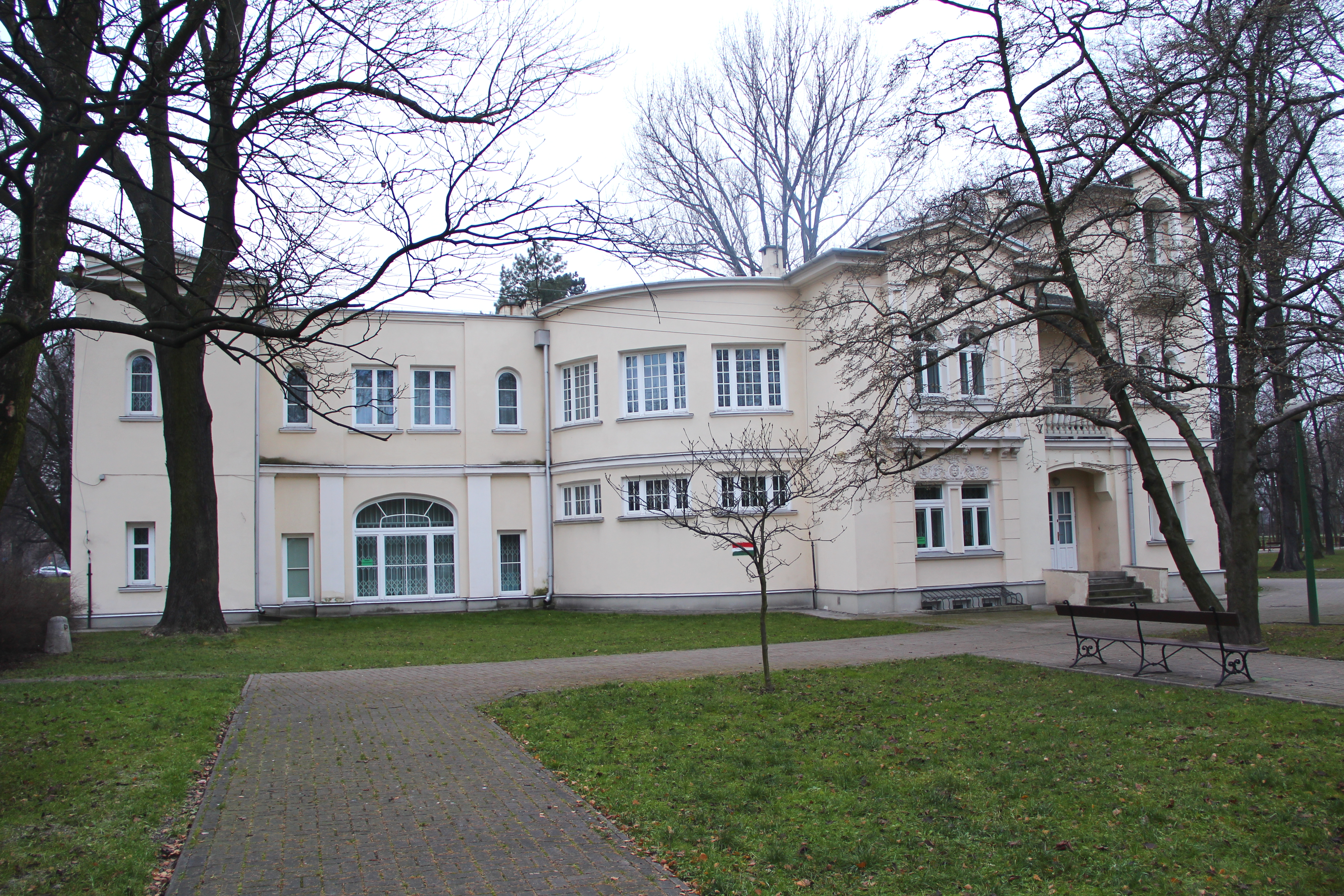
The palace as seen from the west.

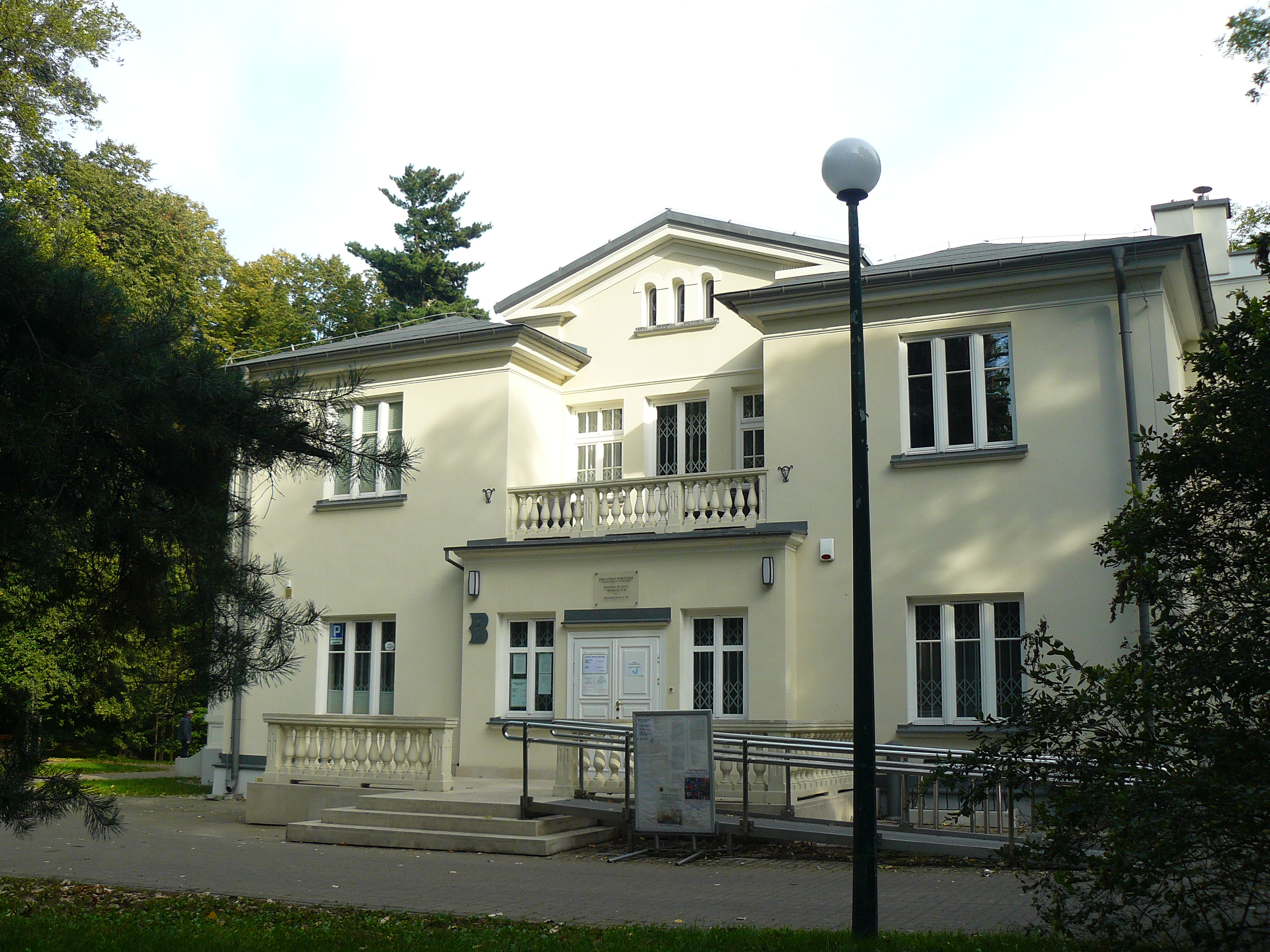
The palace as seen from the east.

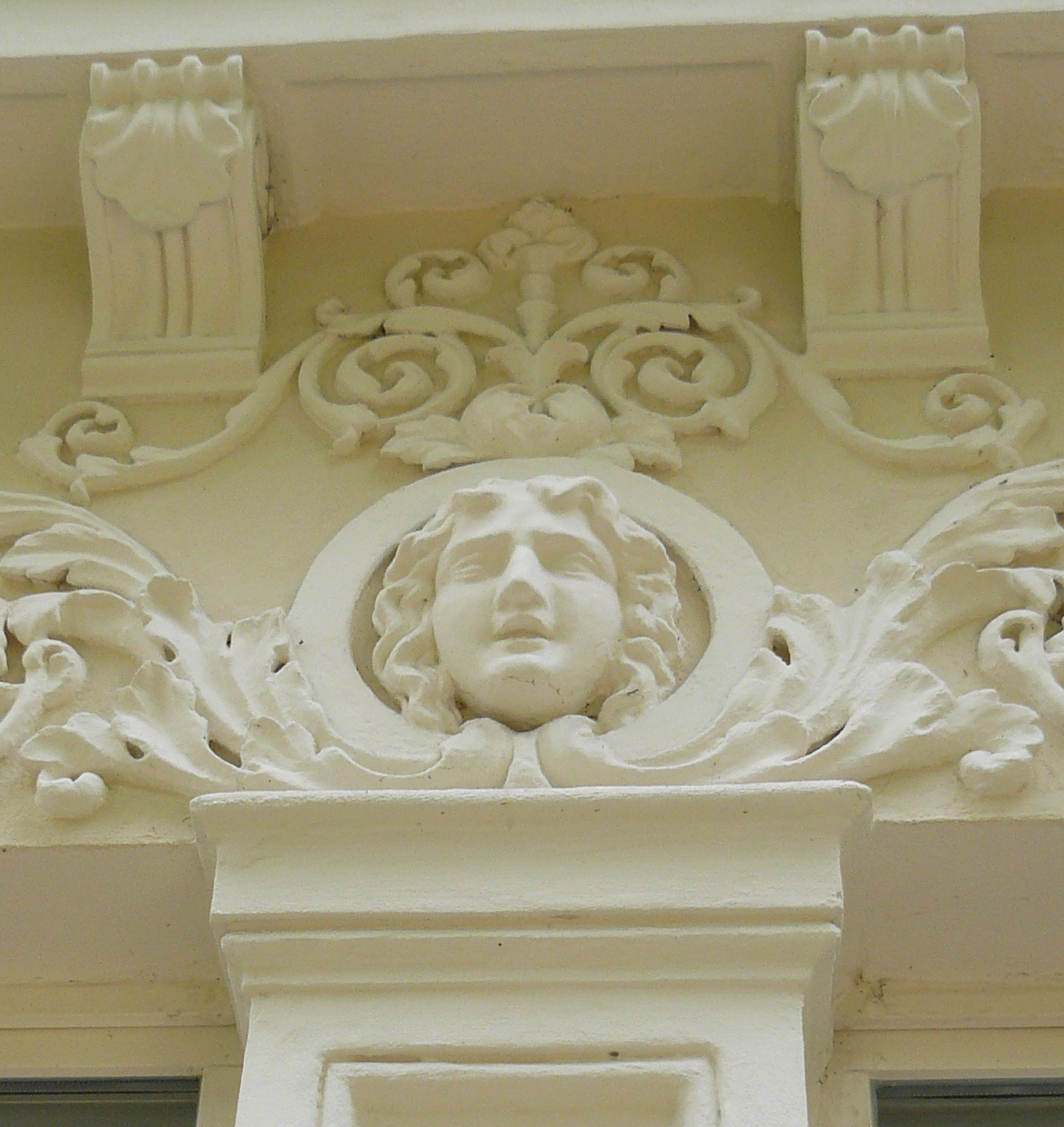
A medallion on the palace façade.

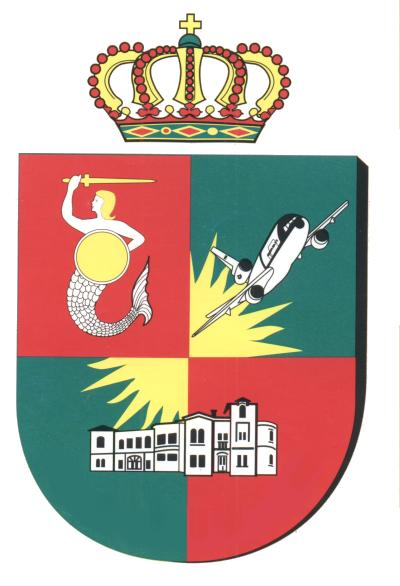
The palace depicted on the coat of arms of the Włochy district.
