= Włochy (neighbourhood) =

Neighbourhood of Warsaw, Poland

- Neighbourhood
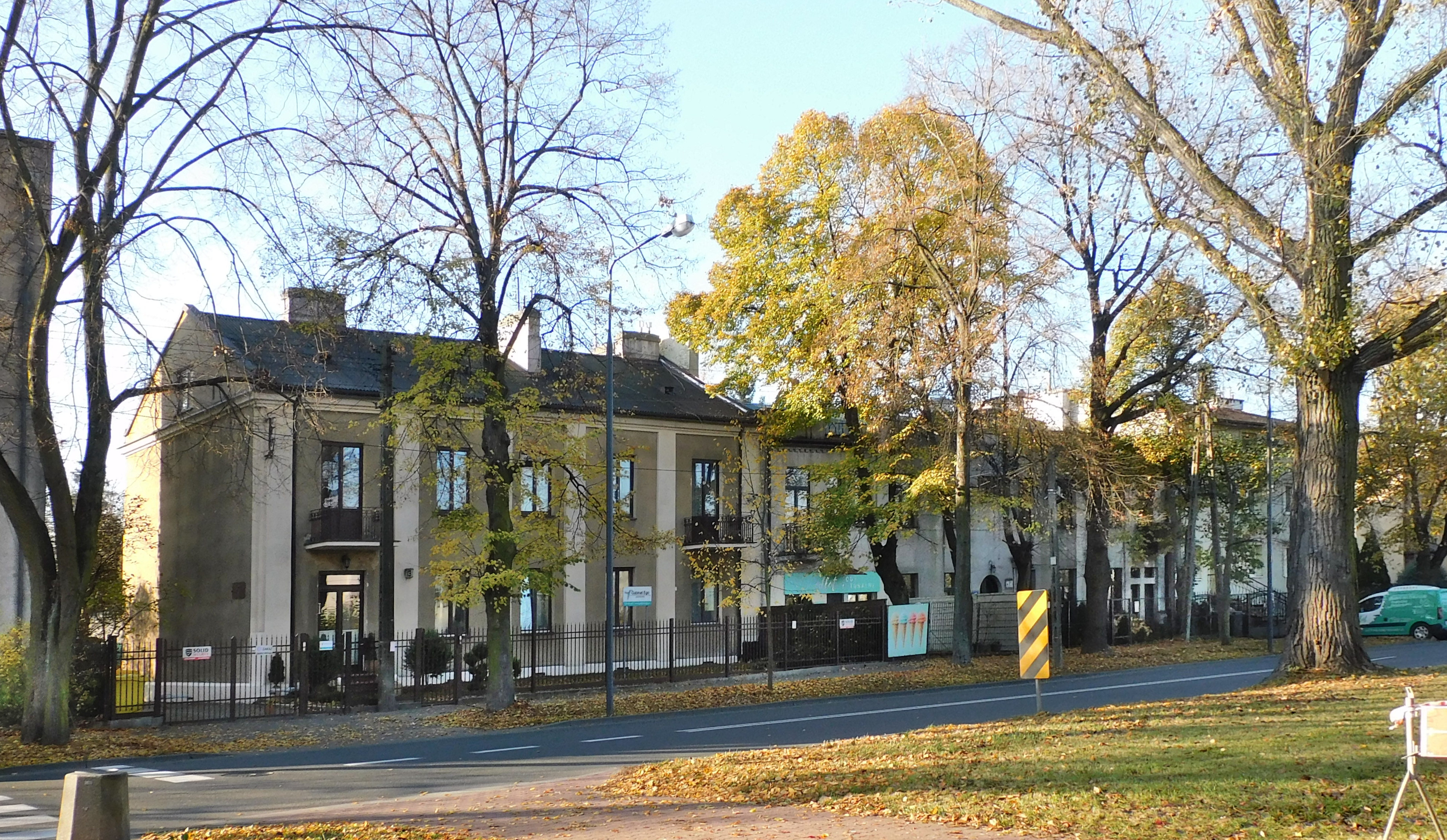
- Townhouses on Chrościckiego Street in Włochy.
- Interactive map of Włochy
- Coordinates: 52.205929°N 20.914113°E
- Country: Poland
- Voivodeship: Masovian
- City county: Warsaw
- District: Włochy
- City Information System areas: New Włochy; Old Włochy
- Time zone: UTC+1 (CET)
  - Summer (DST): UTC+2 (CEST)
- Area code: +48 22

Włochy (Polish: [ˈvwɔ.xɘ̟]) is a neighbourhood of Warsaw, Poland, within the northwestern part of the Włochy district. It is a residential area, predominantly consisting of single-family low-rise houses, with a smaller presence of apartment buildings. The neighbourhood is divided into two halves, with New Włochy in the north, and Old Włochy in the south. They form two areas of the City Information System. In the south, the area also includes the historic neighbourhoods of Budski Szczęśliwickie, Solipse, and Wiktoryn. In its centre, the neighbourhood has the Warszawa Włochy railway station. At its boundaries, it also includes stations Warszawa Aleje Jerozolimskie, Warszawa Raków, and Warszawa Ursus Północny. It also features the Koelichen Palace, a neoclassical residence, dating to 1859, and Fort V "Włochy", retired fortifications from 1888. The neighbourhood also has several urban parks, including Combatans Park, Goat Pond Park, Black Grouse Ponds Park, and Space Gardens. Włochy also has two historic churches, the Church of the Epiphany, from 1939, and the Church of Saints Teresa of the Child Jesus and the Roman Martyrs, completed in 1962. They belong to the Lutheran and Roman Catholic denominations, respectively.

Villages of Sopęchy and Stojarty were first recorded in the area of modern Włochy in 1395 and 1493, respectively. They were founded by the Rakowski family of the clan of Radwan, descending from count Gotard of Służew. In the 15th century, the villages of Porzucewo and Solipse, were separated from Sopęchy. In 1452, a portion of Porzucewo was sold to Jan Włoch, and the village was eventually renamed after him to Włochy in the following century. Sopęchy (since 16th century known as Witki) was burned down by the Swedish army in 1656, during the Second Northern War, while Stojarty was recorded for the last time in the 17th century. In 1795, the estate of Włochy was acquired by count Tadeusz Antoni Mostowski, who developed there his residence together with an English landscape garden, which now forms the Combatants Park. In 1859, in its place was constructed the neoclassical residence, known as the Koelichen Palace, and in 1888, the Fort V "Włochy" was built in the area, as part of the city fortifications, known as the Warsaw Fortress. In the second half of the 19th century, the manufacturing industry developed in Włochy. The hamlet of Wiktoryn was also founded nearby. In 1926, the estate was partitioned and sold off for the development of a residential neighbourhood with villa houses. In 1959, a railway station was opened in Włochy, and later, two more stations were opened in nearby Raków and Wiktoryn, as part of the Electric Commuter Railway. In 1930, Włochy became the seat of a new municipality, named after it, which also included Solipse and Wiktoryn. In 1939, all three settlements were merged to form the town of Włochy. In 1951, it was incorporated into the city of Warsaw.

== Toponymy ==
The neighbourhood of Włochy was named after Jan Włoch, who acquired its portion in 1452, when it was a small village, originally known as Porzucewo. It was first recorded as Włochy in 1517, and in 1523, as Włochy alias Porzucewo. The latter name was eventually completely dropped in the first half of the 16th century. In 1994, the name was also adopted for the city district of Włochy, which includes the neighbourhood. Term Włochy in Polish, also translates to the name of Italy, a country in Southern and Western Europe. However, both locations have different adjectives and demonyms. For the neighbourhood and district, they are "włochowski" and "Włochowianin", while for the country, they are "włoski" and "Włoch", respectively.

== History ==
In 1395, the village of Sopęchy was first recorded in the area of the modern Budki Szczęśliwickie Street. In 1493, the village of Stojarty was also recorded in the area of modern Wiktoryn Street. They were founded by the Rakowski family of the clan of Radwan, descending from count Gotard of Służew. In the 15th century, the villages of Porzucewo and Solipse (then known as Solipsy), were separated from Sopęchy. In 1422, the area was owned by the knight Strachota. The nearby Solipse were first recorded in 1435, eventually becoming property of the Solipski family. In 1452, a portion of Porzucewo was sold to Jan Włoch, and the village was eventually renamed after him. In 1517, it was recorded as Włochy, and in 1523, as Włochy alias Porzucewo. The latter name was eventually completely dropped in the first half of the 16th century. In the 16th century, Sopęchy became home to the descendants of knight Witek, and eventually was renamed to Witki, while the family adopted the surname Witkowiec. In the first half of the 17th century, the landed estate of Włochy was acquired by Andrzej Leszczyński, the Grand Chancellor of the Crown and the primate of Poland, who built there his manor house around 1650. In 1671, it was used as a hideout by Ulrich von Werdum, one of the organisers of a magnate opposition, attempting to nullify the election of Michał Korybut Wiśniowiecki as the king of Poland and Grand Duke of Lithuania. The manor, as well as the village of Witki, were burned down by the Swedish army in 1656, during the Second Northern War, and its area eventually became part of Włochy. The nearby Stojarty was also recorded for the last time in the 17th century. In 1794, the area was also used by Frederick William II, the king of Prussia and Elector of Brandenburg, as his headquarters during the siege of Warsaw.

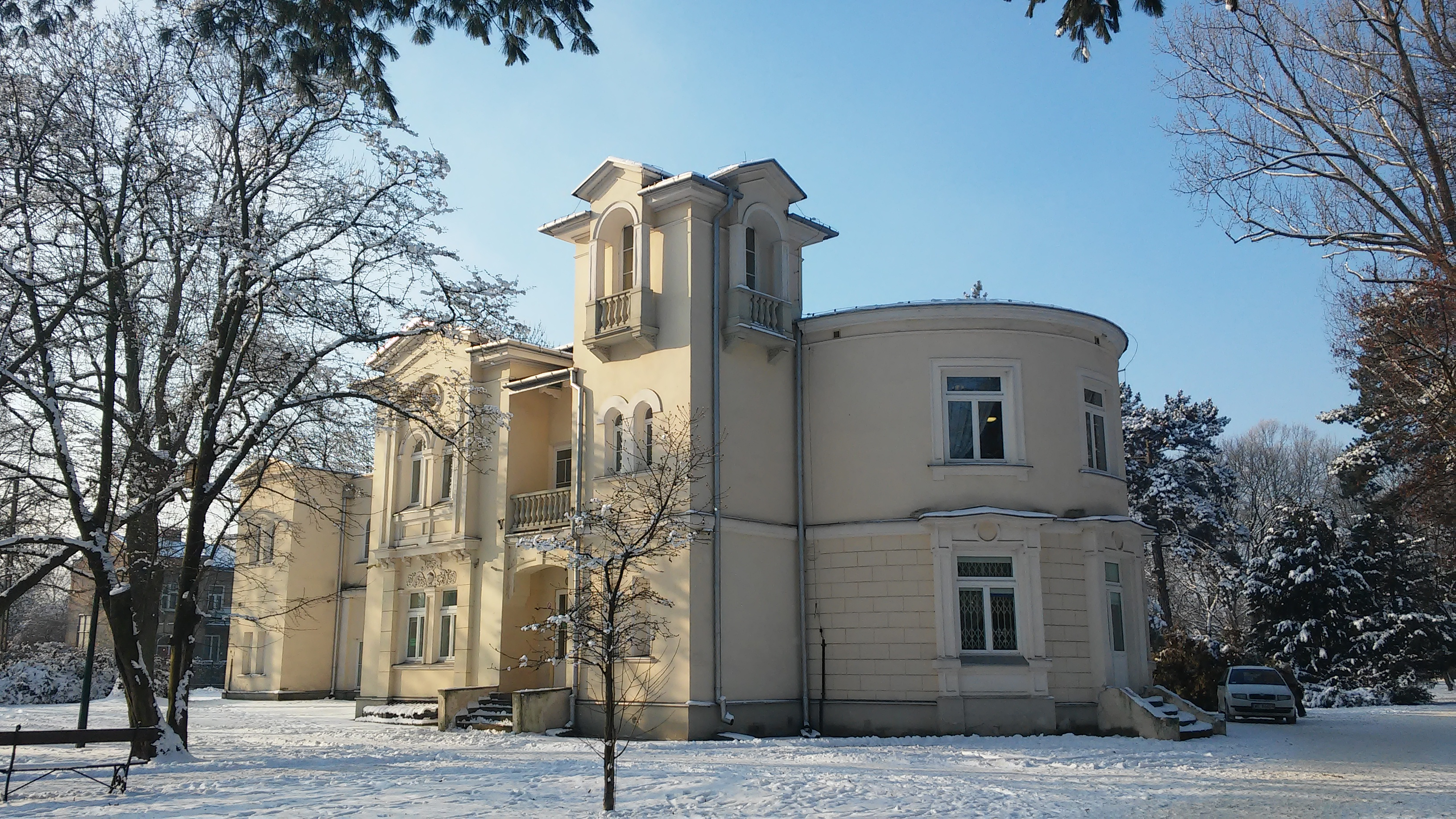
The Koelichen Palace, built in Włochy in 1859.

In 1795, the estate of Włochy was acquired by count Tadeusz Antoni Mostowski, a politician and statesman, who later would become the minister of interior of the Duchy of Warsaw, and the president of the Government Committee of the Interior of the Kingdom of Poland. Around 1800, he founded his residence there and developed a park around it. In 1842, they were redeveloped as a neoclassical palace and an English landscape garden, respectively. The estate was acquired in 1844 by entrepreneur Andrzej Koelichen. The residence was again rebuilt in 1859, with a design by architect Aleksander Zabienowski. It became known as Koelichen Palace. In 1827, Solipse and Włochy had 262 and 81 inhabitants respectively. In the 19th century, the brickworks developed in the area, with the first factory, owned by the Koelichen family, being opened in 1842. The mining of clay in the area, used in the brick production, left behind numerous shallow pits, which then flooded, forming small lakes, such as Black Grouse Ponds and Goat Pond. By the end of the century, a heavy manufacturing industry also developed in the area. In 1845, railway tracks were built passing through the area. In the second half of the 19th century, the hamlet of Wiktoryn was founded to the east of Włochy. In 1859, the Warszawa Włochy station was established for cargo trains, and after 1863, it also opened to passenger service. Following the abolition of serfdom in 1864, the area was incorporated into the municipality of Skorosze. Between 1883 and 1888, the Fort V "Włochy" was constructed by the Imperial Russian Army, between Salomea, Solipse, and Włochy, as part of the city fortifications, known as the Warsaw Fortress. Following its creation, the government enforced construction restrictions on the surrounding area, hindering the development of nearby villages such as Solipse. The fortifications were retired and partially demolished in 1913. Afterwards, their abandoned buildings were taken over by the impoverished and homeless population of Włochy and Solipse, with several small shacks developing in the area. In 1930, the squatter settlement was inhabited by several families, and by 1939, it had a population of around 300 people.

In the 1870s, Włochy had a population of around 160 people, while in the late 1910s, around 500, while Solipse had 214 inhabitants in the year 1800. At the turn of the 20th century, a small impoverished neighbourhood, known as Budki Szczęśliwickie, was developed as an extension of the village of Szczęśliwice. It consisted of small shacks made from wood, metal, and plywood, placed alongside a street extending to the west from the Kraków Road (now Krakowska Avenue), now forming Włodarzewska and Budki Szczęśliwickie Streets.

In 1926, the landed estate of Włochy was partitioned and sold off for the development of a residential neighbourhood with villa houses. It was designed as a garden suburb by Franciszek Krzywda-Polkowski and Miłosław Kotyński, with an average plot of land measuring 700 m^{2} (7534.7 sq ft). The same year, the Włochy Fire Guard, a local fire department, was founded in the same year, and in 1928, the local police station was also opened. Additionally, in 1928, the garden around the Koelichen Palace was opened to the public as a recreational urban space, known as the Combatants Park. The same year, the Przyszłość Włochy sports club was also founded in the village. In 1930, a wooden chapel was built in New Włochy, becoming the seat of the Roman Catholic Parish of Saints Teresa of the Child Jesus and the Roman Martyrs in 1934. The same year, the Włochy Cemetery was also founded at the intersection of Ryżowa and Zapusta Streets, to the north of Fort V. In 1931, Włochy had around 1,000 members of the Evangelical Church of the Augsburg Confession. From 1933, it had a chapel in Koelichen Palace, and in 1939, it opened the Church of the Epiphany at 22 Cietrzewia Street, as part of the Parish of the Holy Trinity.

In 1927, the tracks of the Electric Commuter Railway were constructed passing to the south of Wiktoryn. Two stations were opened in the area, Włochy EKD, now known as Warszawa Raków, and Wiktoryn. The line formed a connection between Warsaw and Grodzisk Mazowiecki. In 1932, a branch line was constructed alongside Popularna Street, extending the railway line to Warszawa Włochy station. The Wiktoryn station was moved to the new line, at the intersection of Popularna and Krańcowa Streets, and was later renamed to Warszawa Włochy Graniczna. Additionally, in 1934, the Warszawa Aleje Jerozolimskie station was also opened near Jerusalem Avenue. The Electric Commuter Railway line was closed down in 1971, together with all of its stations in the area, except Warszawa Raków.

On 15 April 1930, Włochy became the seat of a new municipality, named after it, which also included the village of Solipse, and hamlets of Marianówki and Wiktoryn-Rappówek, as well, as small farming settlements extending from Wiktoryn. On 20 October 1933, the municipality was divided into two village assemblies divided by the railway tracks, with New Włochy in the north, and Old Włochy in the south. On 1 April 1939, the municipality was transformed into a town, keeping the name Włochy. It also incorporated some lands from the nearby municipalities of Blizne and Skorosze.

On 8 September 1939, Włochy was captured by the Wehrmacht during the German invasion of Poland in the Second World War. Throughout the conflict, German soldiers were stationed in the town. On 15 November 1940, a ghetto was created in Fort V "Włochy", repurposing abandoned barracks and small shacks in the area. It housed around 300 Jewish residents, forcibly relocated there from Łomianki, Piastów, Ożarów Mazowiecki, and Włochy. For comparison, before the war, the town had around 100 Jewish inhabitants in 1939. The ghetto had poor living conditions and was closed down in February 1941, with its remaining residents being moved to the Warsaw Ghetto. During its existence, the local government and civilians, led by the mayor Franciszek Kostecki, and the Roman Catholic parish, smuggled around 100 people from the ghetto, giving them new identities with documents made in the town hall. Almost all of those responsible for the operation were arrested on 18 November 1942, and later executed in the Auschwitz concentration camp. Following the arrest, the local Catholic parish, as well as several household owners, continued to help in hiding Jewish people in the town.

On 22 November 1939, soldiers of the 7th Legions' Infantry Regiment of the Polish Armed Forces formed an underground resistance group, nicknamed Madagaskar, with their first base of operations in Włochy. The group recruited people from local settlements, mainly from Włochy, Okęcie, Ursus, Ożarów Mazowiecki, Jelonki, and Boernerowo. It trained its members for the military resistance against the occupying forces, later taking the form of the Warsaw Uprising of 1944. The group itself was forced to move out of Włochy, when a secret meeting of its members was discovered by the Gestapo officers on 1 February 1942. Five members of Madagaskar were killed, while all but one of the survivors were arrested. The group was eventually reorganised and reactivated in Boernerowo in October 1942. From 1941, another unit of the Polish resistance, known as the Łużyce Air Base, operated in Włochy and Okęcie. It aimed to provide pilots and personnel for the resistance military, in case it were able to capture an aerodrome in Warsaw. However, following the beginning of the uprising on 1 August 1944, the unit was instead relegated to serve in other operations as part of Garłuch, as the Polish military failed to fulfil original plans. Additionally, from 1943, the Jaworzyn unit also organised several disruptive and sabotage operations in Włochy, such as setting fire to the local town hall on 5 May 1944, leading to half of the German documents being lost in the event. In 1944, the Solipse Cemetery was founded at 1 Na Krańcu Street, to the south of Fort V "Włochy", by the Roman Catholic Parish of St. Joseph the Spouse of Our Lady in Ursus. It was originally predominantly used as a burial ground for the Polish civilian and military casualties during the Warsaw Uprising.

On 25 August 1944, the German authorities announced in Włochy that men between the ages of 17 and 35 had to report to them, under the pretence of being taken for an "extraordinary work assignment". Around 300 men who came the next day were rounded up and taken first to the Dulag 121 camp in Pruszków, and from there, to the Mauthausen concentration camp in Austria. On 16 September 1944, the authorities rounded up around 4,500 men, mainly from Włochy, with their ages ranging between 16 and 50, or, according to some sources, 55. This constituted almost the entire working-age male population of the town. They were rounded up in the Combatants Park, from where they were taken to the camp in Pruszków. The majority were then sent to other concentration camps to perform forced labour. Around 3,500 were taken by train, while the rest were forced to walk. It is estimated that up to half of the people forcibly taken from the town in August and September died as a result. On 17 January 1945, Włochy and Okęcie were liberated from the occupation by the Polish People's Army.

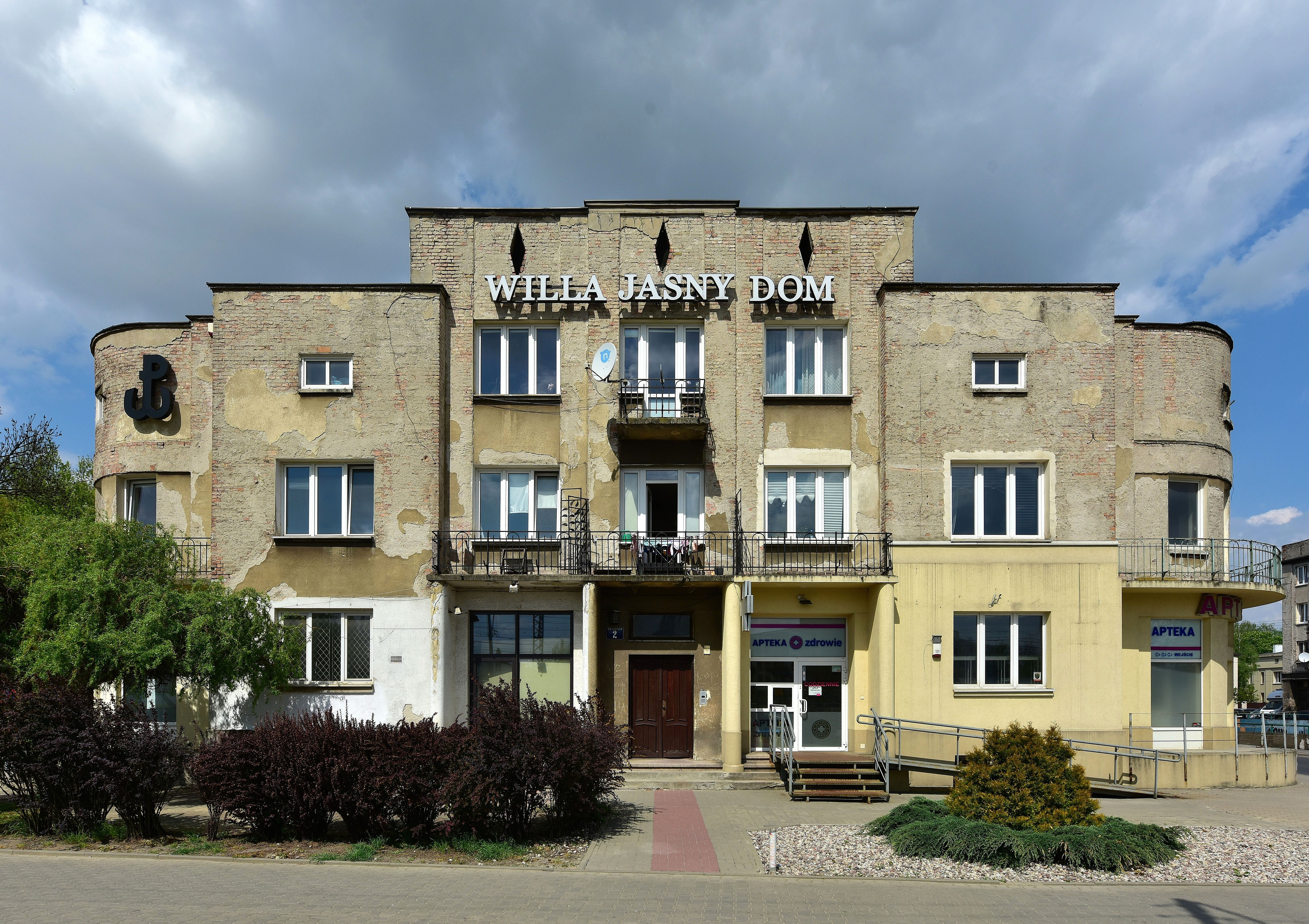
The Bright House villa in Włochy, which in 1945, served as the arrest of the Main Directorate of Information, the military counterintelligence agency of Poland.

In January 1945, the government confiscated several buildings alongside Cienista Street in Włochy, which were then given to the military. They became branches of the People's Commissariat for Internal Affairs (NKVD) and the People's Commissariat for State Security (NKGB), two secret police institutions of the Soviet Union. The buildings were used to hold and interrogate people accused of association with, and participation in, the anti-communist resistance and anti-government dissident movement. The interrogations were performed brutally with the frequent use of torture techniques, and several recorded instances of executions. Afterwards, people were sent to the prison camp in Rembertów and the prison at 8 Strzelecka Street in Praga-North, both also operated by the People's Commissariat for Internal Affairs. Additionally, the nearby Bright House, a modernist villa at 2 Świerszcza Street, dating to the 1930s, was used as the arrest of the Main Directorate of Information, the military counterintelligence agency of Poland. Its officers, most of whom came from the People's Commissariat for Internal Affairs, also tortured their arrestees to attain information. Additionally, the buildings in the area of Cienista Street were also used to house soldiers of the Polish People's Army. The Soviet and Polish organisations operated in the area for several months. After their departure, the Security Service set up its local branch nearby, at 26 Globusowa Street, continuing the interrogation practices for another 9 years.

In 1946, Włochy had 18,911 residents. The town was incorporated into the city of Warsaw on 15 May 1951, becoming part of the Ochota district.

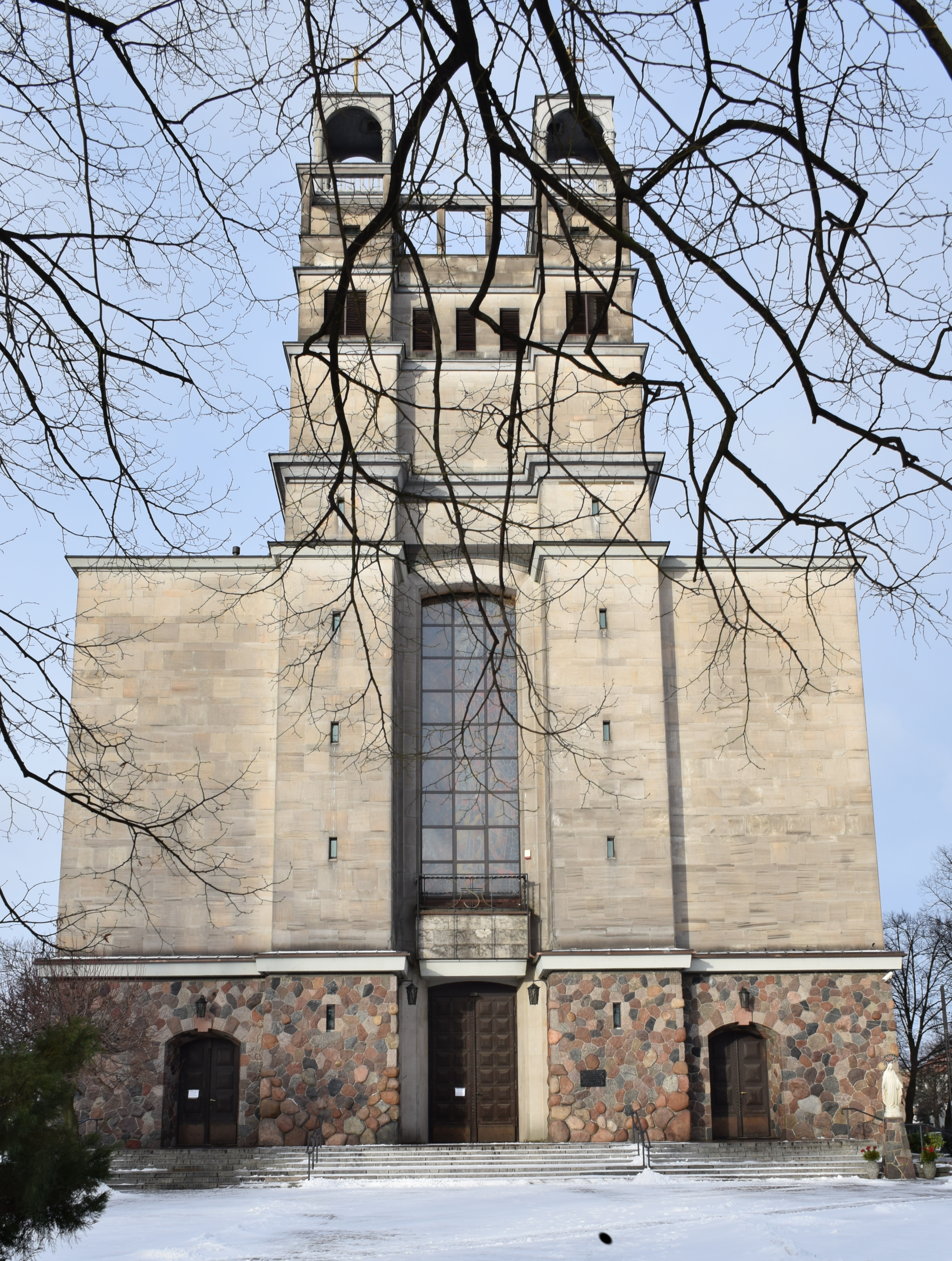
The Church of Saints Teresa of the Child Jesus and the Roman Martyrs, built between 1946 and 1965.

In 1946, the Church of Saints Teresa of the Child Jesus and the Roman Martyrs began its construction in New Włochy, located at 27 Rybnicka Street, at the corner with the current Chrościckiego Street. In 1951, the government withdrew the building permit. The parish decided to continue its construction regardless, leading to harassment from the government and the Security Service. The first mass was held inside in 1953, and all services were regularly held there from 1958. The building was officially finished in 1965.

In 1957, the old chapel of the Parish of Saints Teresa of the Child Jesus and the Roman Martyrs was taken apart and rebuilt in 1959 at a new location, at 46 Popularna Street in Old Włochy. It became the Our Lady of La Salette Church, administered by the Missionaries of La Salette. In 1976, it became the seat of a new parish, and its building was expanded in the 1990s.

In 1971, the Warszawa Ursus Północny railway station was opened between Cykady and Szamoty Streets, as part of the line between stations Warsaw West and Kunowice. On 3 August 1987, around 15:30, two passenger trains collided at the Warszawa Włochy station, leading to 8 people dying, and over 30 being injured, of whom 8 later died in hospital. Around 2.5 hours earlier, two trams also collided in the city's district of Wola, at the crossing of Młynarska and Wolska Streets, with 7 people dying, and 76 being injured. Due to both tragedies, the date became known as the "Black Thursday of Warsaw Transit". The city observed 4 August as a day of mourning.

In 1973, Jerusalem Avenue was extended from the city centre to the intersection with Łopuszańska Street in Włochy and Raków.

On 29 December 1989, following an administrative reform in the city, Włochy became part of the municipality of Warsaw-Ochota. On 25 March 1994, the area, including Okęcie, Opacz Wielka, Raków, Salomea, Włochy, and Załuski, was separated, forming a new municipality, named Warsaw-Włochy, after the titular neighbourhood. On 27 October 2002, it was restructured into the city district of Włochy. On 19 May 2004, it was subdivided into the City Information System areas, with the neighbourhood of Włochy being divided into New Włochy, to the north, and Old Włochy, to the south. Their boundary was marked by the railway line between the stations of Warsaw West and Grodzisk Mazowiecki.

In 1998, the Helena Chodkowska University of Technology and Economics (originally known as the Higher School of Management and Marketing) was founded in Włochy, at 135 Jutrzenki Street, as a private university.

In 2019, the Space Gardens, a small urban park with an area of around 3 ha, was opened at the intersection of Plastyczna and Sympatyczna Streets.

== Housing ==
Włochy is a residential area, predominantly consisting of single-family low-rise houses, with a smaller presence of apartment buildings. The neighbourhood is divided into two halves, with New Włochy in the north, and Old Włochy, by the railway line, between stations Warsaw West and Kunowice, with Warszawa Włochy station in its centre. In the south, the area also includes the historic neighbourhoods of Budski Szczęśliwickie, Solipse, and Wiktoryn.

== Parks and recratation ==
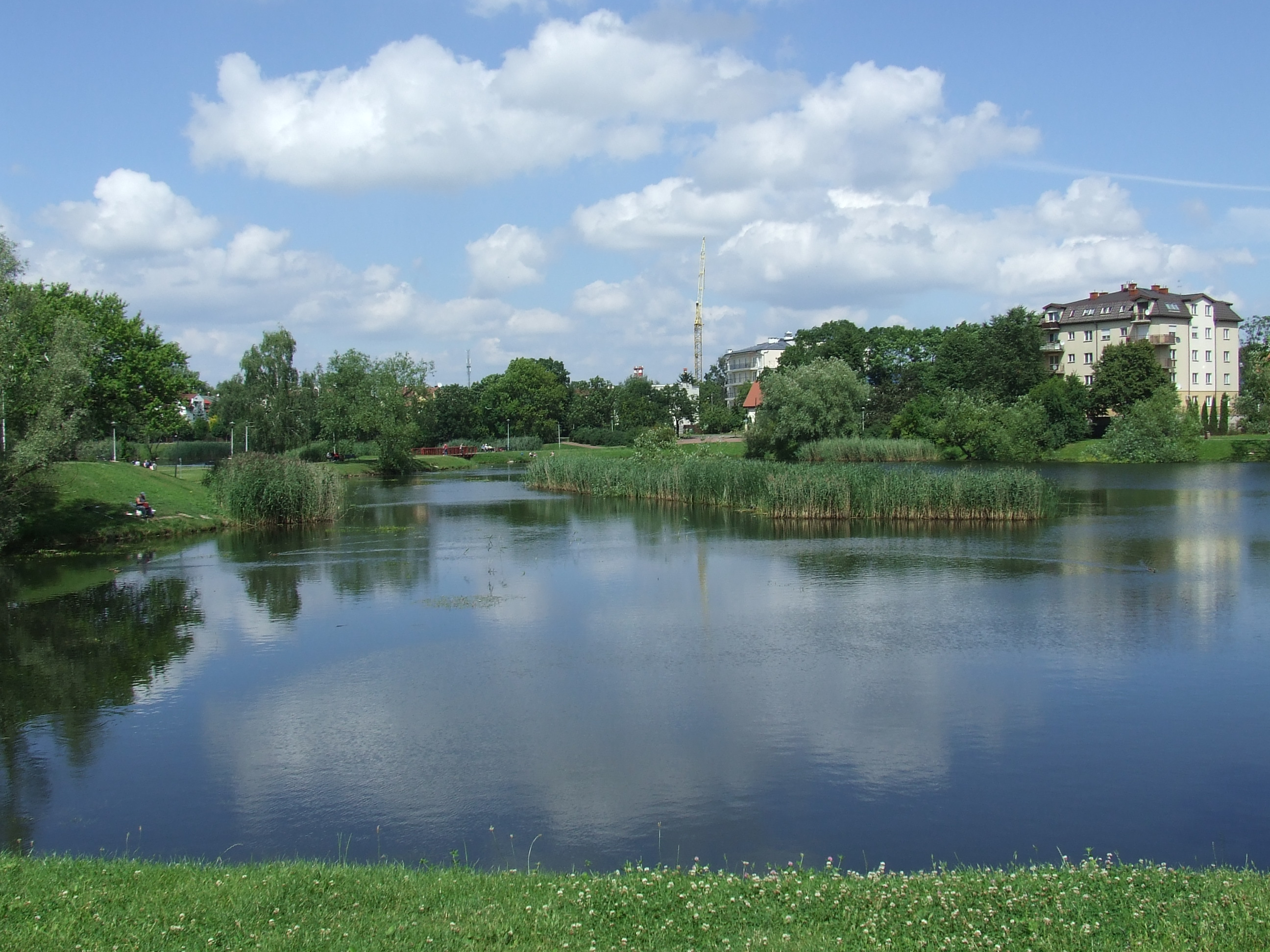
The Goat Pond in Włochy.

Włochy includes several parks. Among them is the Combatants Park, located in its northeast, with an area of 4.46 ha (11 acres). It features the Koelichen Palace, a historical neoclassical residence from 1859, currently functioning as a public library. Another park is also located to its north, and centred around a lake known as the Goat Pond. Additionally, the Space Gardens, a park measuring around 3 ha, is located further to the east, at the intersection of Plastyczna and Sympatyczna Streets. Moreover, another park is located in the south, near Cietrzewia and Krańcowa Streets, and centred around two ponds, collectively known as the Black Grouse Ponds. Włochy also features two small garden squares, the Freedom Square at the intersection of Dymna and Wszemirowska Streets, and the Sixteenth of September 1944 Square, at the intersection of Chrościckiego and Rybnicka Streets. Additionally, Fort V "Włochy", a retired historical fortification from 1888, is located at the intersection of Ryżowa Street, and Czwartego Czerwca 1989 roku Street, and used as an urban park. Additionally, Włochy also has another small pond, known as the Dual Clay Pond, with an area of 0.13 ha, located Cegielna Street.

The neighbourhood also hosts the Przyszłość Włochy sports club, with its homefield located at 25 Rybnicka Street.

== Transport ==
The neighbourhood is crossed by the railway line, between stations Warsaw West and Kunowice, with Warszawa Włochy station in its centre. Three more railway stations are located at the neighbourhood boundaries. They are: Warszawa Aleje Jerozolimskie near Jerusalem Avenue, Warszawa Raków on Łopuszańska Street, and Warszawa Ursus Północny between Cykady and Szamoty Streets.

== Religion and cementries ==
Włochy features two Roman Catholic churches within its boundaries, including the Church of Saints Teresa of the Child Jesus and the Roman Martyrs at 27 Rybnicka Street, and the Our Lady of La Salette Church at 46 Popularna Street, administered by the Missionaries of La Salette. The first of them includes two Baroque paintings by Michael Willmann, dating to around 1700, which were donated to it in 1952. Włochy also has the Church of the Epiphany at 22 Cietrzewia Street, which belongs to the Evangelical Church of the Augsburg Confession, as part of the Parish of the Holy Trinity. Additionally, the neighbourhood also includes two burial grounds, located near Fort V. They are the Włochy Cemetery, located at the intersection of Ryżowa and Zapusta Streets, and administrated by the Parish of Saints Teresa of the Child Jesus and the Roman Martyrs, and the Solipse Cemetery at 1 Na Krańcu Street, administrated by the Roman Catholic Parish of St. Joseph the Spouse of Our Lady in Ursus.

== Higher education ==
Włochy includes the Helena Chodkowska University of Technology and Economics at 135 Jutrzenki Street, which operates as a private university.

== Locations and boundaries ==
Włochy is a neighbourhood located in the northwestern part of the Włochy district. It is divided between two halves, with New Włochy in the north, and Old Włochy in the south. They form two area of the City Information System, and are divided by the railway line no. 447. When combined, their boundaries are approximately determined by the railway lines no. 447 and 507, and Odolany branch lines to the north; railway lines no. 8 and 47, Jerusalem Avenue, Wiktoryn Street, Popularna Street, Pryzmaty Street, and around a building at 75 Popularna 75 Street, to the east; and Łopuszańska Street, Kleszczowa Street, Dojazdowa Street, the Kleszczowa bus garage, Przerwana Street, Solipse Cemetery, Zapusta Street, and railway line no. 3, to the south-west. The neighbourhood borders Chrzanów and Jelonki Południowe to the north, Raków, Odolany, and Szczęśliwice to the east, Salomea to the south, and Skorosze and Szamoty to the west.
