= Combatants Park =

Urban park in Warsaw, Poland

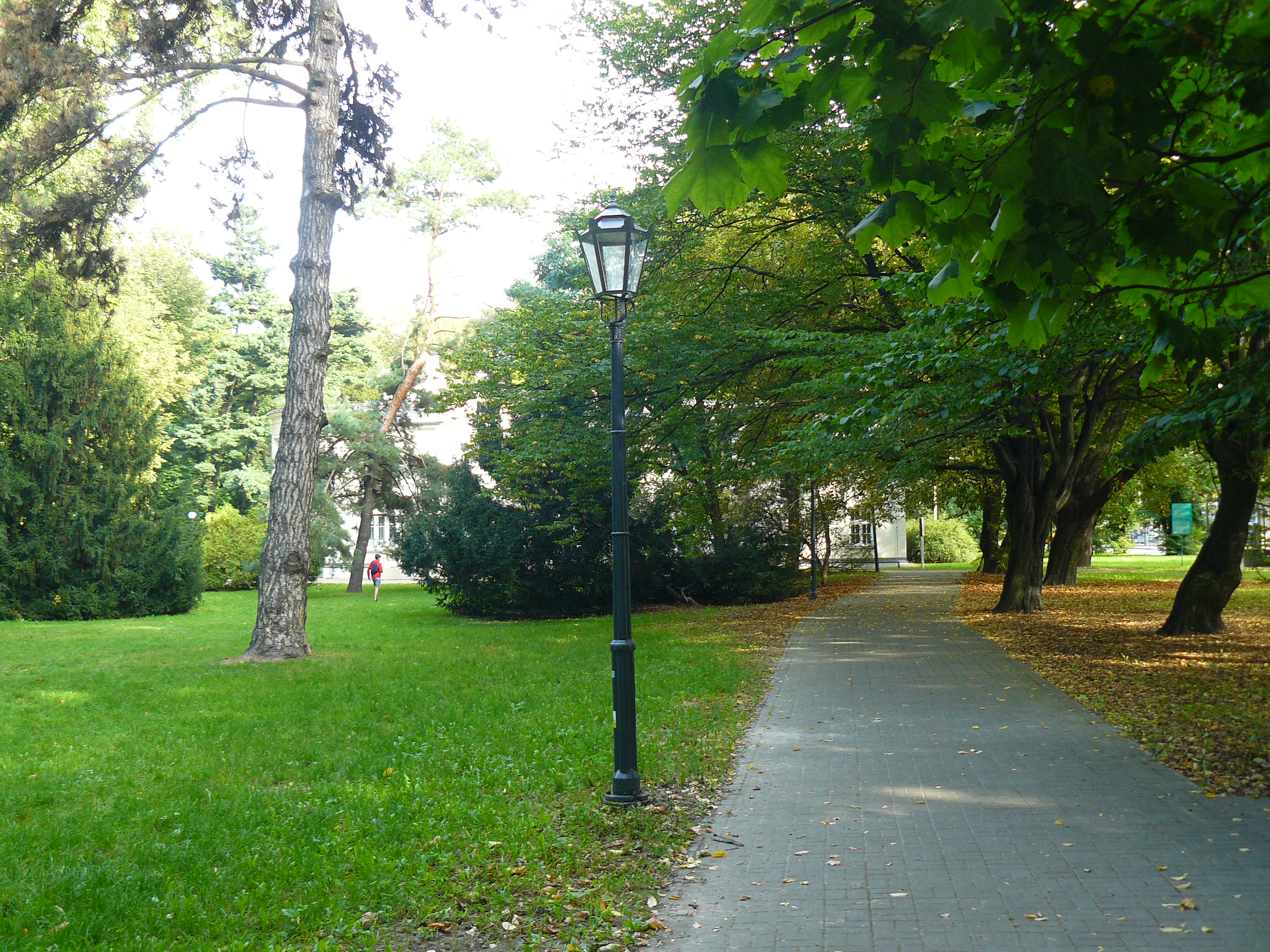
- The Combatants Park in 2020.
- Interactive map of Combatants Park
- Type: Urban park
- Location: Włochy, Warsaw, Poland
- Coordinates: 52°12′25″N 20°54′45″E
- Area: 5.06 hectares (12.5 acres)
- Created: c. 1800 (original development); 1842 (redevelopment); 1928 (as a public park)
- Designer: A. Szubert (original garden); F. James (1842 redevelopment)

The Combatants Park (Polish: Park Kombatantów), also known as the Koelichen Park (Polish pronunciation: [kɔ.ɛˈli.xɛn]; Polish: Park Koelichenów), is an urban park in Warsaw, Poland, located within the Włochy district. It is placed between Obrońców Pokoju, Cianista, Świerszcza, Chrościckiego, and Łuki Wielkie Streets, within the neighbourhood of New Włochy. It has an area of 5.06 ha (1250.353 acres). It includes the Koelichen Palace, a historic neoclassical palace dating to 1859, which currently houses a public library. The park was originally developed as a garden around a palace residence, founded around 1800, by politician and statesman Tadeusz Antoni Mostowski, a politician and statesman. In 1842, it was redeveloped as English landscape garden, together with construction of a new residence, which was later replaced in 1859 by the Koelichen Palace.

== History ==
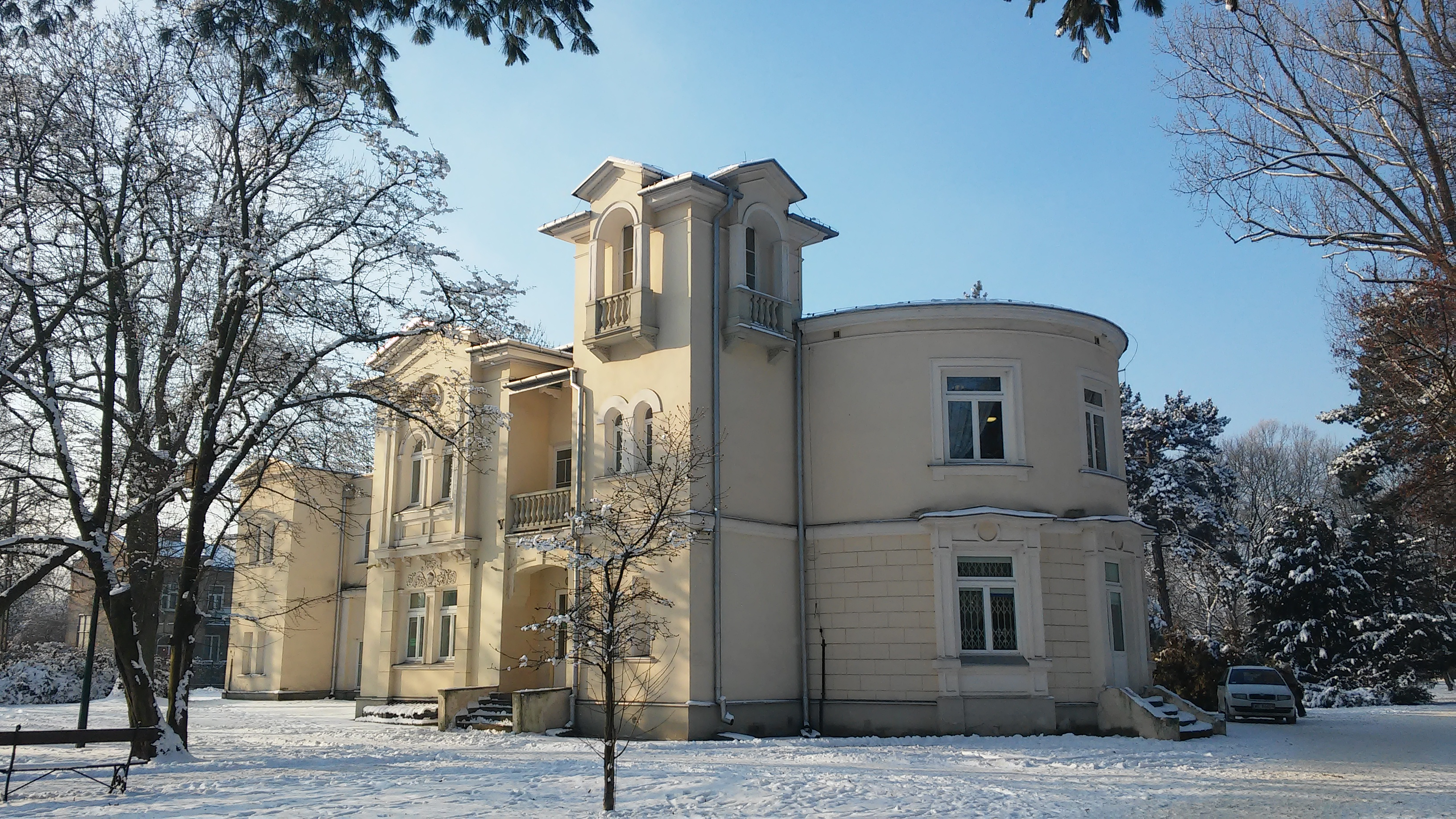
The Koelichen Palace in the Combatants Park, built in 1859.

In the first half of the 17th century, the landed estate of Włochy was acquired by Andrzej Leszczyński, the Grand Chancellor of the Crown and the primate of Poland, who built there his manor house around 1650. In 1671, it was used as a hideout by Ulrich von Werdum, one of the organisers of a magnate opposition, attempting to nullify the election of Michał Korybut Wiśniowiecki as the king of Poland and Grand Duke of Lithuania. In 1794, the area was also used by Frederick William II, the king of Prussia and Elector of Brandenburg, as his headquarters during the siege of Warsaw. The manor, as well as the village of Witki, were burned down by the Swedish army in 1656, during the Second Northern War, and its area eventually became part of Włochy. The nearby Stojarty was also recorded for the last time in the 17th century. In 1794, the area was also used by Frederick William II, the king of Prussia and Elector of Brandenburg, as his headquarters during the siege of Warsaw.

In 1795, the estate of Włochy was acquired by count Tadeusz Antoni Mostowski, a politician and statesman, who later would become the minister of interior of the Duchy of Warsaw, and the president of the Government Committee of the Interior of the Kingdom of Poland. Around 1800, he founded his residence there and developed a park around it, the later being designed by A. Szubert. In 1842, they were redeveloped as a neoclassical palace and an English landscape garden, respectively. The later was redesigned by an English gardener F. James. The estate was acquired in 1844 by entrepreneur Andrzej Koelichen. The residence was again rebuilt in 1859, with a design by architect Aleksander Zabienowski, and became known as Koelichen Palace. The palace and the garden remained the property of the Koelichen family until 1939.

In 1928, as the nearby area developed into a residential neighbourhood with villa houses, the garden around the Koelichen Palace was opened to the public as a recreational urban space, known as the Combatants Park. The urban development was designed by Franciszek Krzywda-Polkowski and Miłosław Kotyński. From 1933, the Koelichen Palace housed a chapel of the local Lutheran Evangelica community, until its new temple, the Church of the Epiphany was opened. In 1931, the community had around 1,000 members. In 1936, a library owned by the Property Owners Association was opened in the palace.

On 16 September 1944, while the area was under the German occupation during the Second World War, the authorities rounded up around 4,500 men, mainly from Włochy, with their ages ranging between 16 and 50, or, according to some sources, 55. This constituted almost the entire working-age male population of the town. They were rounded up in the Combatants Park, from where they were taken to the camp in Pruszków. The majority were then sent to other concentration camps to perform forced labour. Around 3,500 were taken by train, while the rest were forced to walk. It is estimated that up to half of the people forcibly taken from the town in August and September died as a result. On 17 January 1945, Włochy and Okęcie were liberated from the occupation by the Polish People's Army.

The palace was renovated and restored after the end of the Second World War. The library was reopened in the palace in 1947, it began being operated by the local municipal government.

Between 1999 and 2000, the park underwent a thorough renovation, with installation of new lamps and new sidewalks being laid. Between 2007 and 2008, the park was expanded to encompass the entirety of the area between Obrońców Pokoju, Cianista, Świerszcza, Chrościckiego, and Łuki Wielkie Streets. In 2010, a park gate was built at Chrościckiego Street, next to the palace. It was designed to resemble another, historic gate in the park, located at intersection of Cienista, Obrońców Pokoju, and Zdobnicza Street, which dates to the 18th century.

== Characteristics ==
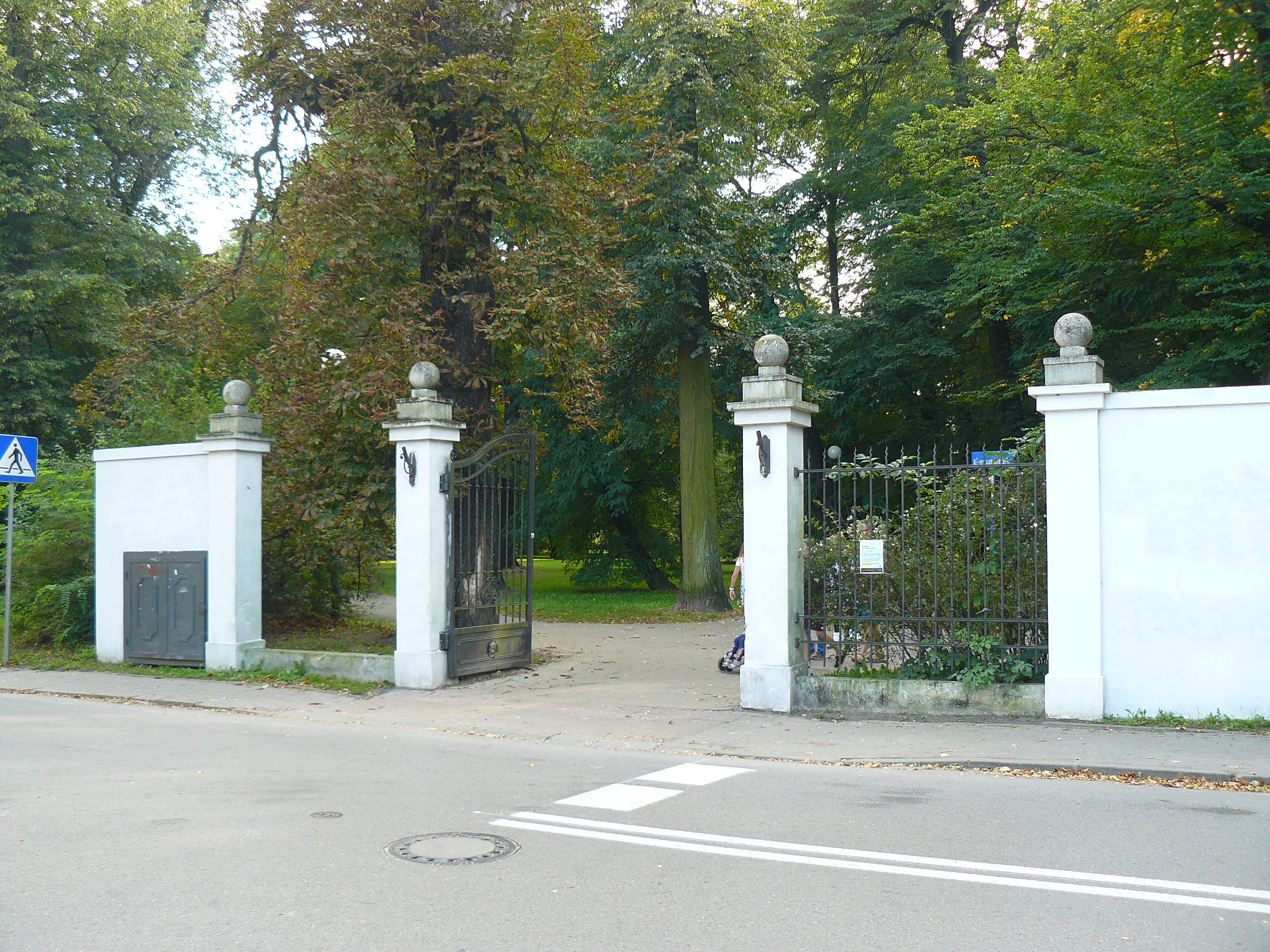
A historic 18th-century park gate, at the intersection of Cienista, Obrońców Pokoju, and Zdobnicza Street.

The Combatans Park is located between Obrońców Pokoju, Cianista, Świerszcza, Chrościckiego, and Łuki Wielkie Streets, and has an area of 5.06 ha (1250.353 acres). Majority of its land is covered by woodland. It has a few individual trees aged above 100 years, including: a small-leaved lime (around 250 years), a London plane (around 130 years), a field maple (around 130 years), two European black pines (around 130 years), and an American tulip tree (around 110 years). They have status of natural monuments, with another European black pine and small-leaved lime additionally holding it.

In the south, the park also includes the Koelichen Palace, a historic neoclassical palace dating to 1859. Placed near Chrościckiego Street, it currently houses a public library. Additionally, the park also features a portion of historic 18th-century fence, including a gate at the intersection of Cienista, Obrońców Pokoju, and Zdobnicza Street, as well as numerous benches dating to the interwar period. Furthermore, the park includes three memorial plaques, as well as a Christian cross, dedicated: people killed in, and deported from Włochy during the German occupation in the Second World War, people rounded up by German officers in the park on 16 September 1944, from where they were send to concentration camps, and people held, tortured, and killed in the People's Commissariat for Internal Affairs (NKDV) headquarters complex in Włochy in 1945.

To the north, it borders another park centered around the Goat Pond with an area of 2.2 ha (5.44 acres). The pond itself has an area of 2.0643 ha (5.1 acres).

== Gallery ==
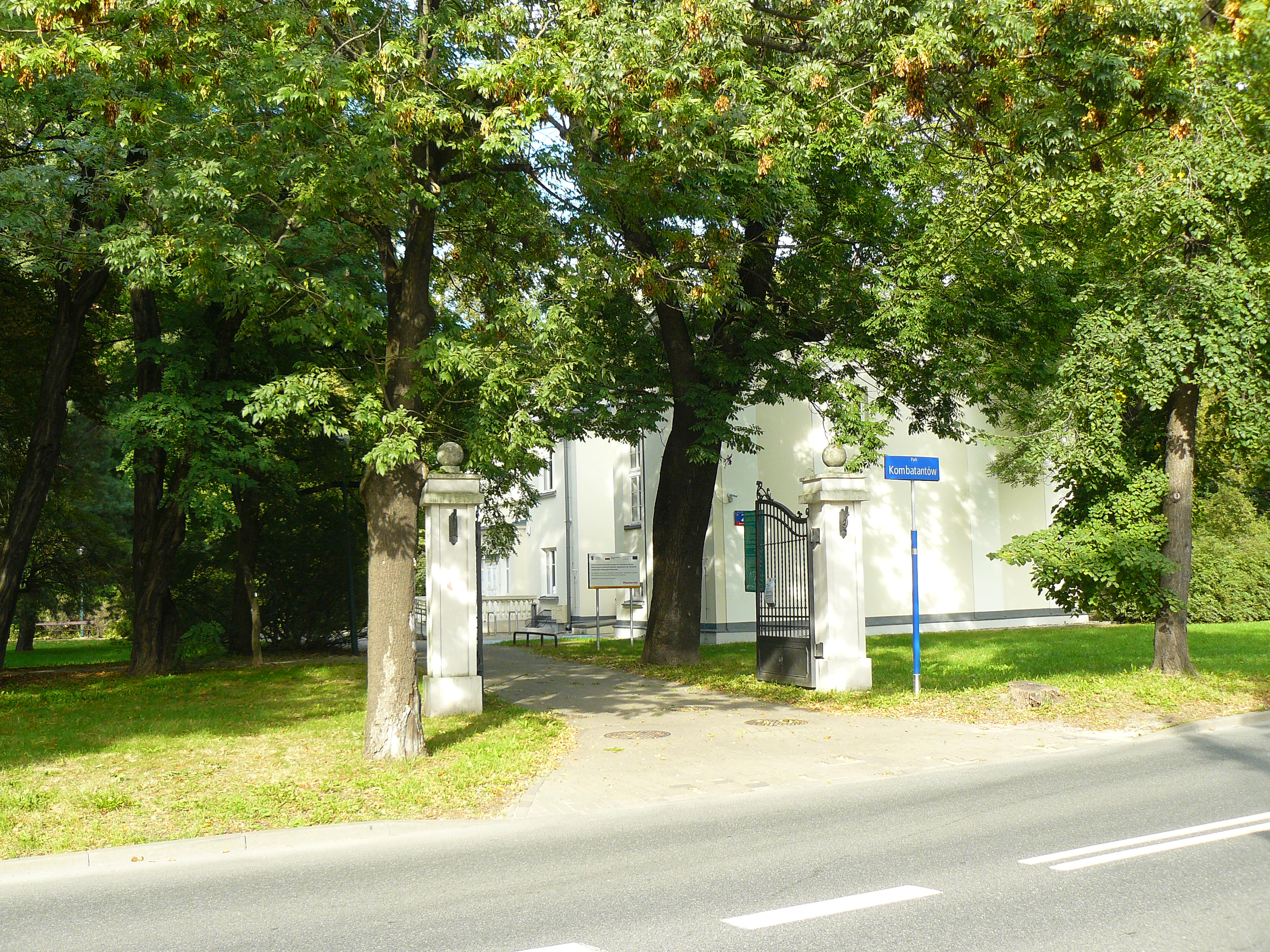
A gate on Chrościckiego Street.

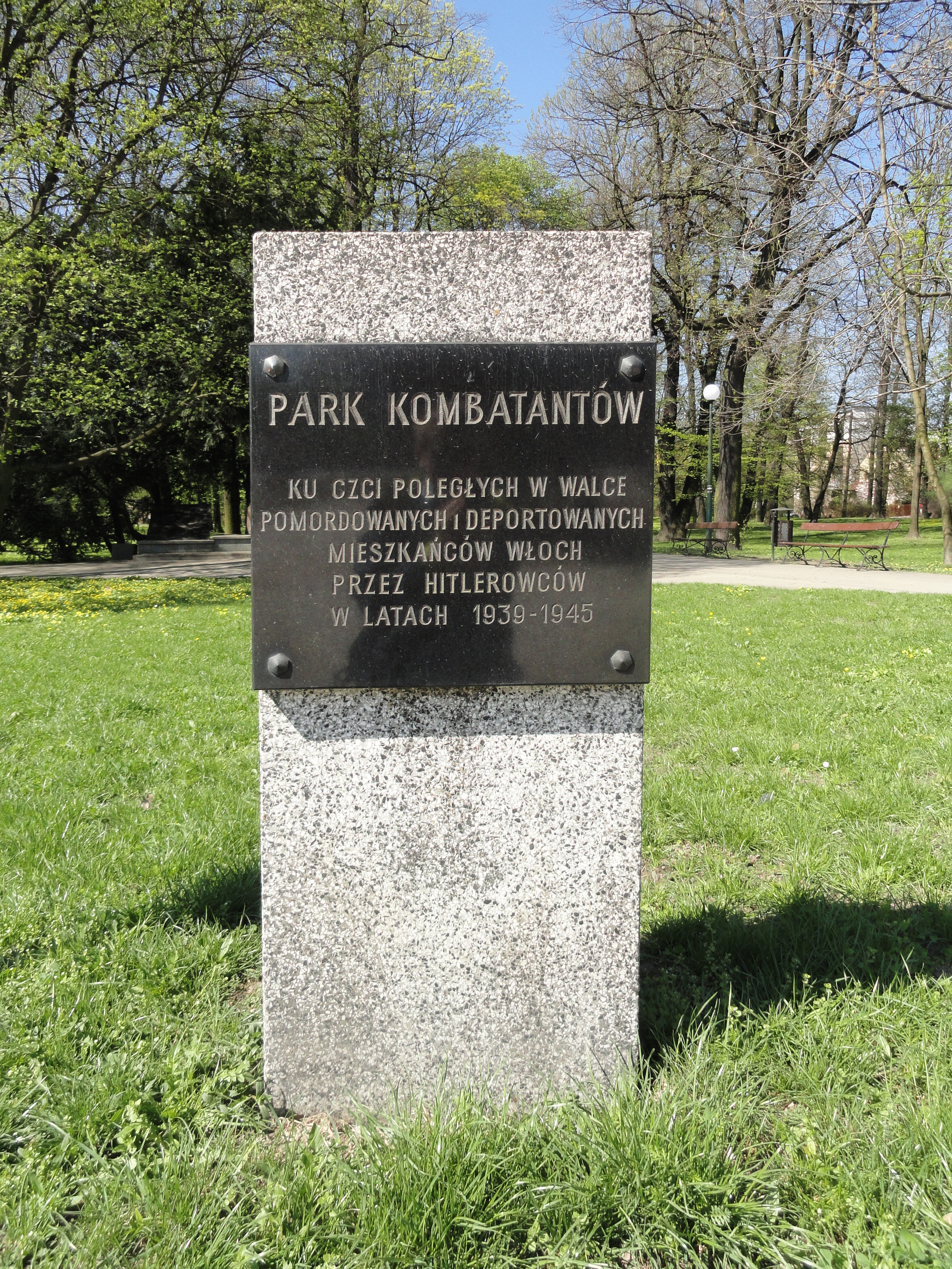
Memorial to people killed in, and deported from Włochy during the German occupation in the Second World War between 1939 and 1945.

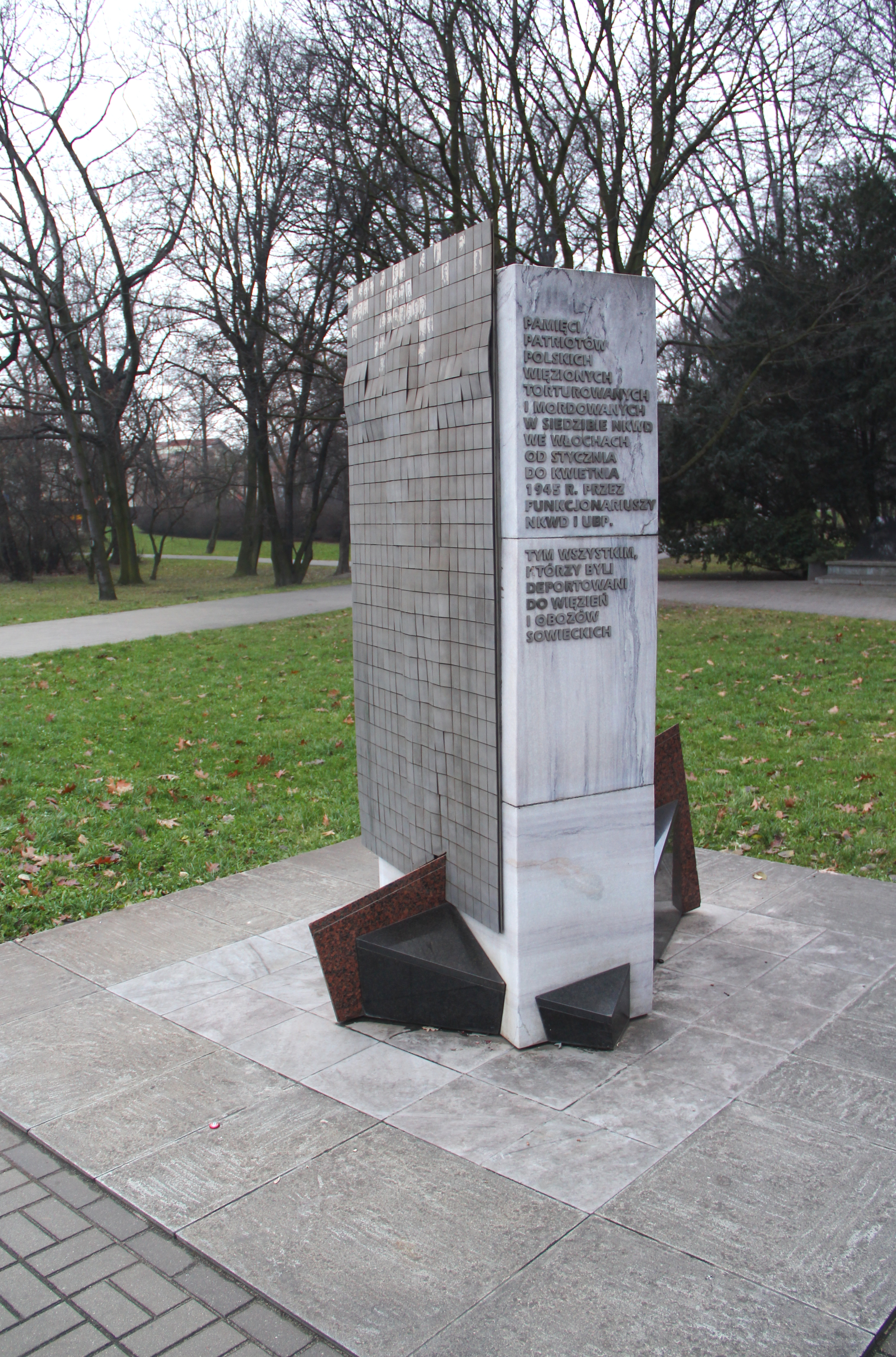
Memorial to people held, tortured, and killed in the People's Commissariat for Internal Affairs (NKDV) headquarters complex in Włochy, in 1945.

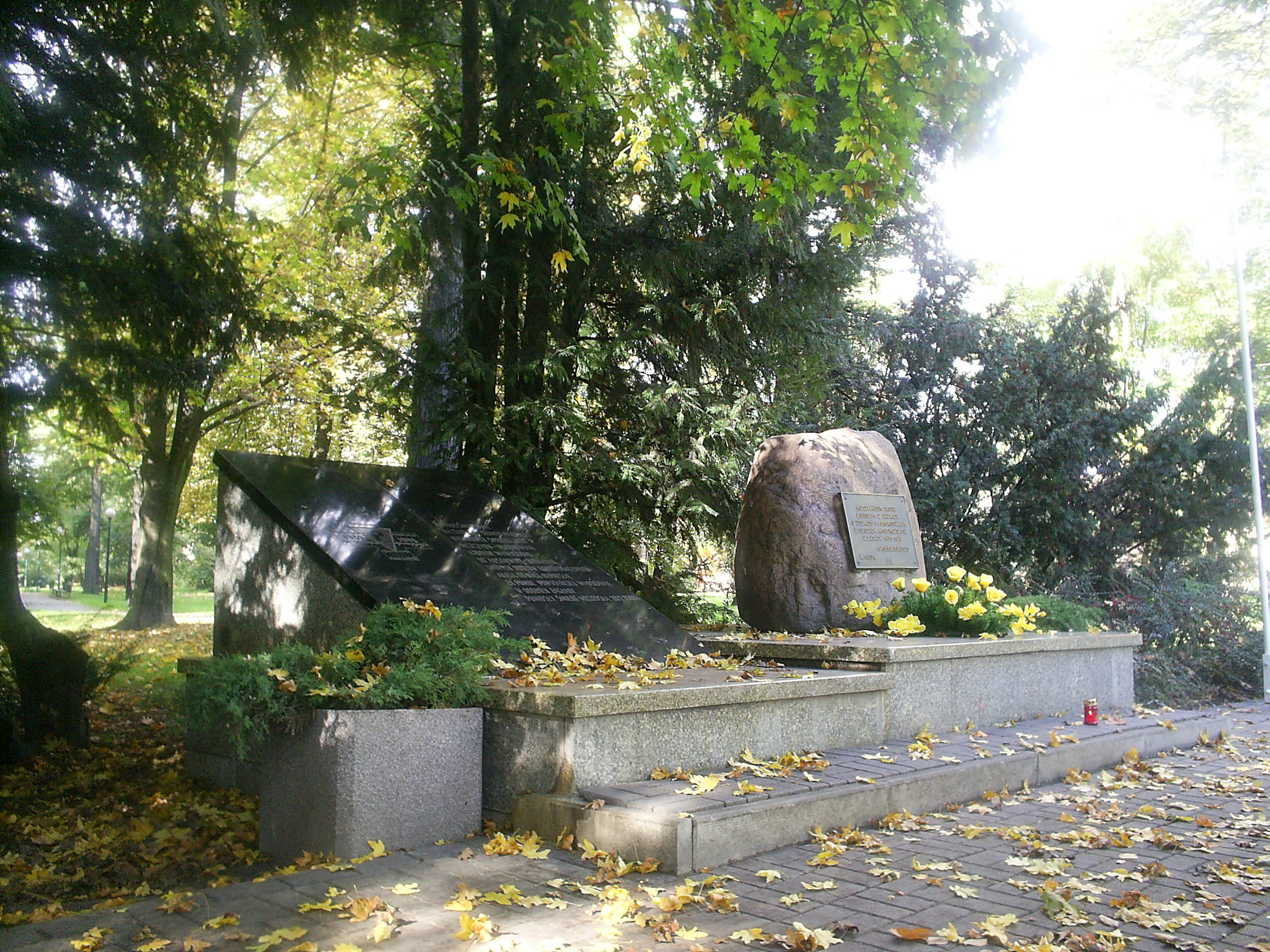
A monument dedicated to people rounded up by German officers in the park on 16 September 1944, from where they were send to concentration camps, and people killed in Włochy during the German occupation.

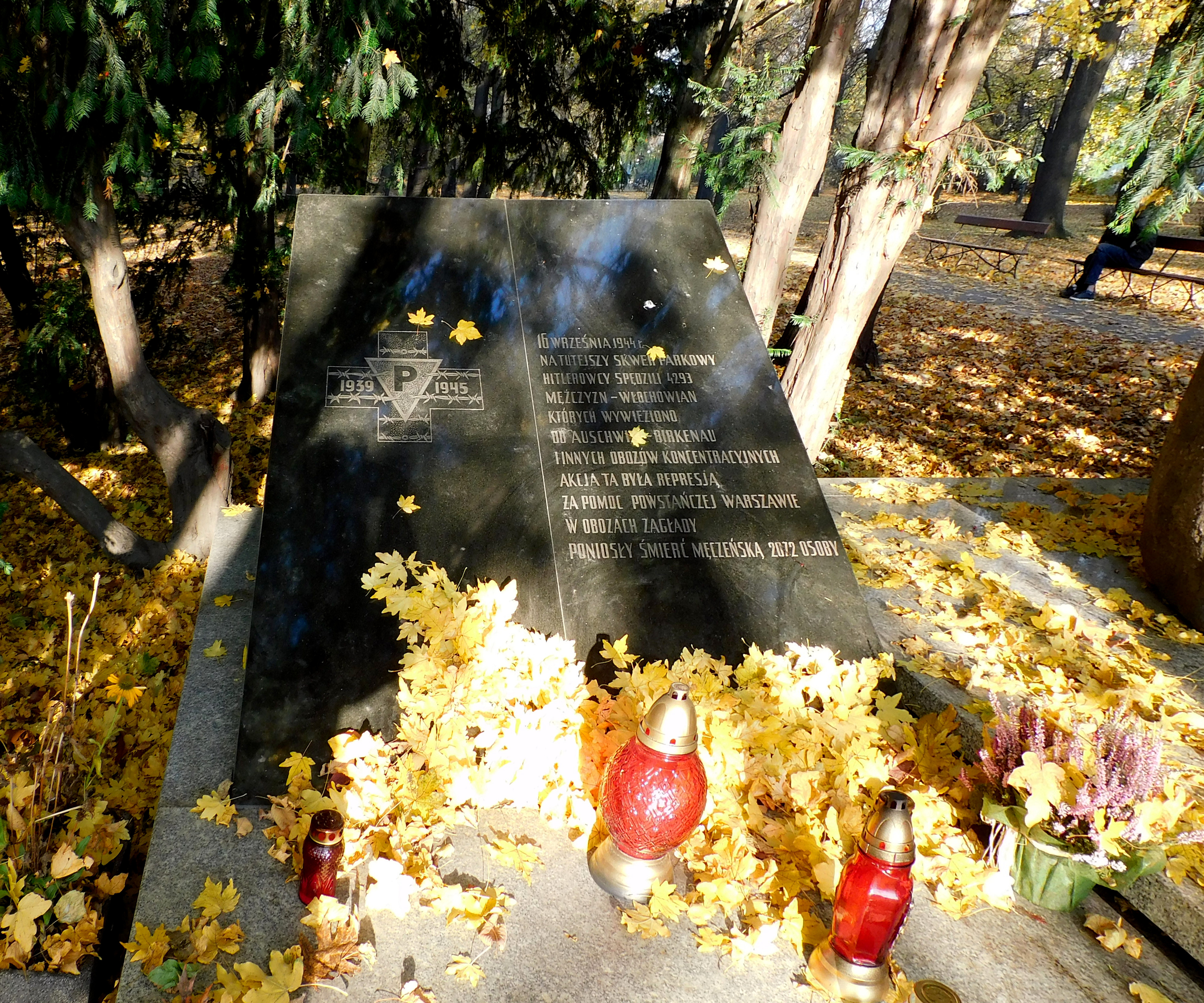
A plaque dedicated to people rounded up by German officers in the park on 16 September 1944, from where they were send to concentration camps.

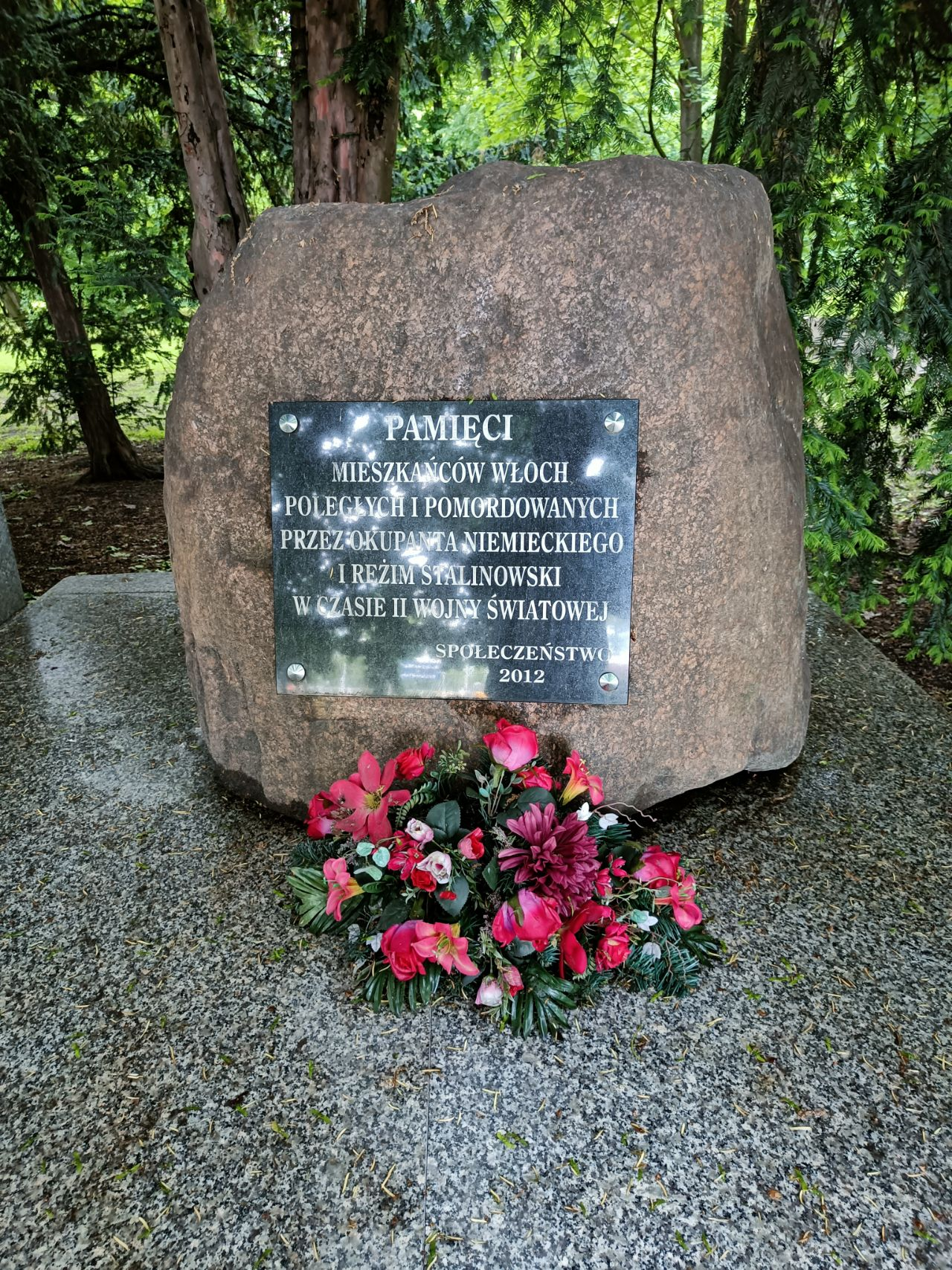
A plaque on a stone dedicated to people killed in Włochy during the German occupation.

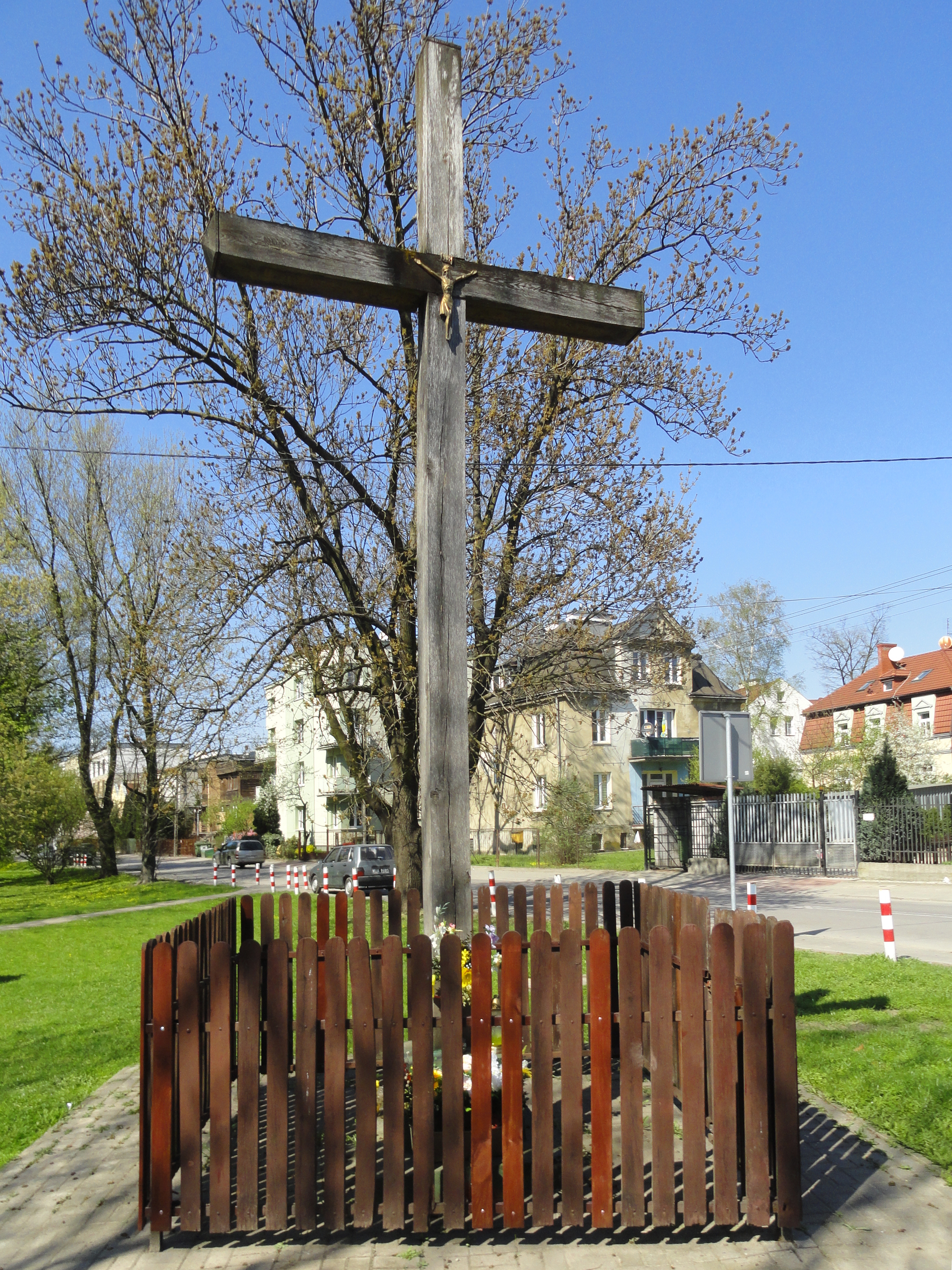
A Christian cross at the intersection of Cienista and Świerszcza Street, dedicated to people killed in Włochy during the German occupation.
