= Siege of Warsaw (1794) =

Battle of the Kościuszko Uprising

- Part of the Kościuszko Uprising
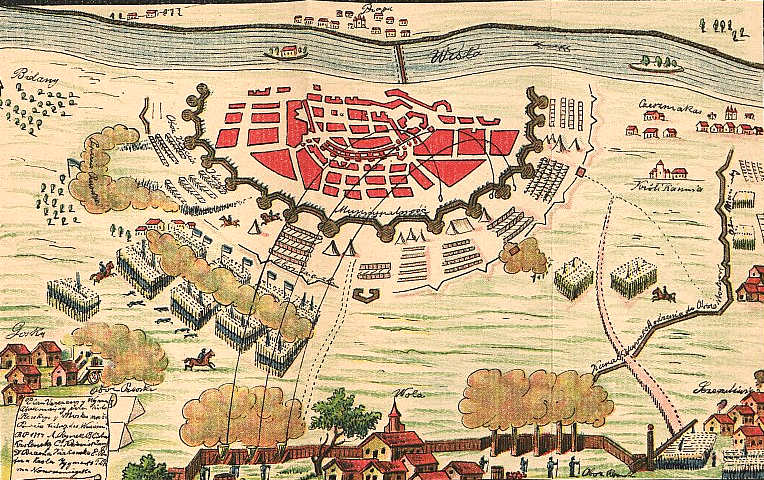
- 19th century plan of the siege of Warsaw.
Date	13 July – 6 September 1794
Location	Warsaw
Result	Polish victory

Belligerents
Poland-Lithuania	(Russia) Russian Empire; Kingdom of Prussia

Commanders and leaders
Tadeusz Kościuszko	Frederick William II; Johann Hermann von Fersen

Strength
35,000–44,000	Prussians: 25,000–30,000; Russians: 13,000–65,000

Casualties and losses
Unknown	Unknown

The Siege of Warsaw of 1794 was a joint Russian and Prussian siege of the capital of the Polish–Lithuanian Commonwealth, during the Kościuszko Uprising in the summer of 1794. It ended with the Polish victory when, after a two-month siege, the Prussian and Russian army ended the siege and withdrew from Warsaw.

== Background ==
Warsaw, the capital of the Polish–Lithuanian Commonwealth, was one of the key strategic areas for all sides in the Kościuszko Uprising. Secured by the Poles during the Warsaw Uprising in April, it was threatened by the forces of the Imperial Russia and Kingdom of Prussia. The leader of the Uprising, Tadeusz Kościuszko, gathered forces to defend Warsaw, and around 7 to 11 July fought a delaying battle at Raszyn.

== Opposing forces ==
Kościuszko was able to gain some time to finish preparation for the upcoming siege, dividing his forces into the field army (23,000), garrison (3,000) and city militia (18,000). Another estimate gave him 35,000 men and 200 guns. The field army had a line of field fortifications and trenches prepared outside the main city walls and fortifications.

The besieging forces were commanded by King Frederick William II of Prussia, whose army numbered about 25,000 and 179 guns, with a Russian army of about 65,000 and 74 guns under Johann Hermann von Fersen. Another estimate gives the Prussian size at 30,000 and the Russian, at 13,000.

== Siege ==
The attackers decided to delay their assault, waiting for heavy artillery. They launched their first attack on 27 July in the direction of Wola, but were pushed back by a division under Prince Józef Poniatowski. To relieve the pressure of the siege, Kościuszko ordered the Uprising in Greater Poland, which succeeded in disrupting the Prussian forces. Kościuszko became more radical in his political influence, endorsing the Polish Jacobins to gather more popular support. The second assault by the besieging Prussian and Russian armies on 26 to 28 August was also defeated, and with the spreading of unrest in Greater Poland, Frederick William II ordered his forces to end the siege and withdraw. The Prussians would retreat to the Bzura river, while the Russians, under von Fersen, would camp near the southern Pilica river region.

The Polish victory at Warsaw is seen as one of the major accomplishments of Kościuszko, and one of the two greatest Polish victories in the Uprising, second to the success of the Greater Poland Uprising itself, which was inspired by the siege.

== Aftermath ==
Despite this victory, the Uprising would soon end with Kościuszko's defeat at the Battle of Maciejowice in October followed by the bloody taking of Warsaw in November.
