= Warsaw–Terespol railway =

Rail line in Poland

The Warsaw − Terespol Railway (Polish: Kolej Warszawsko-Terespolska, Russian: Варшавско-Тереспольская железная дорога) is a 211 kilometres (131 mi) long railway in Poland, opened in 1866 between Warsaw and Terespol, as a part of the railway between Warsaw and Moscow.

Today the line is designated by the Polish State Railways (PKP) as Rail Line 2. Along with Line 3 it forms Rail Line E20 which is the Polish part of the Pan-European Corridor II, linking Berlin with Moscow. In addition to international passenger and freight traffic the line also carries significant regional commuter traffic in the Masovian Voivodeship between Warsaw and Siedlce.

== History ==
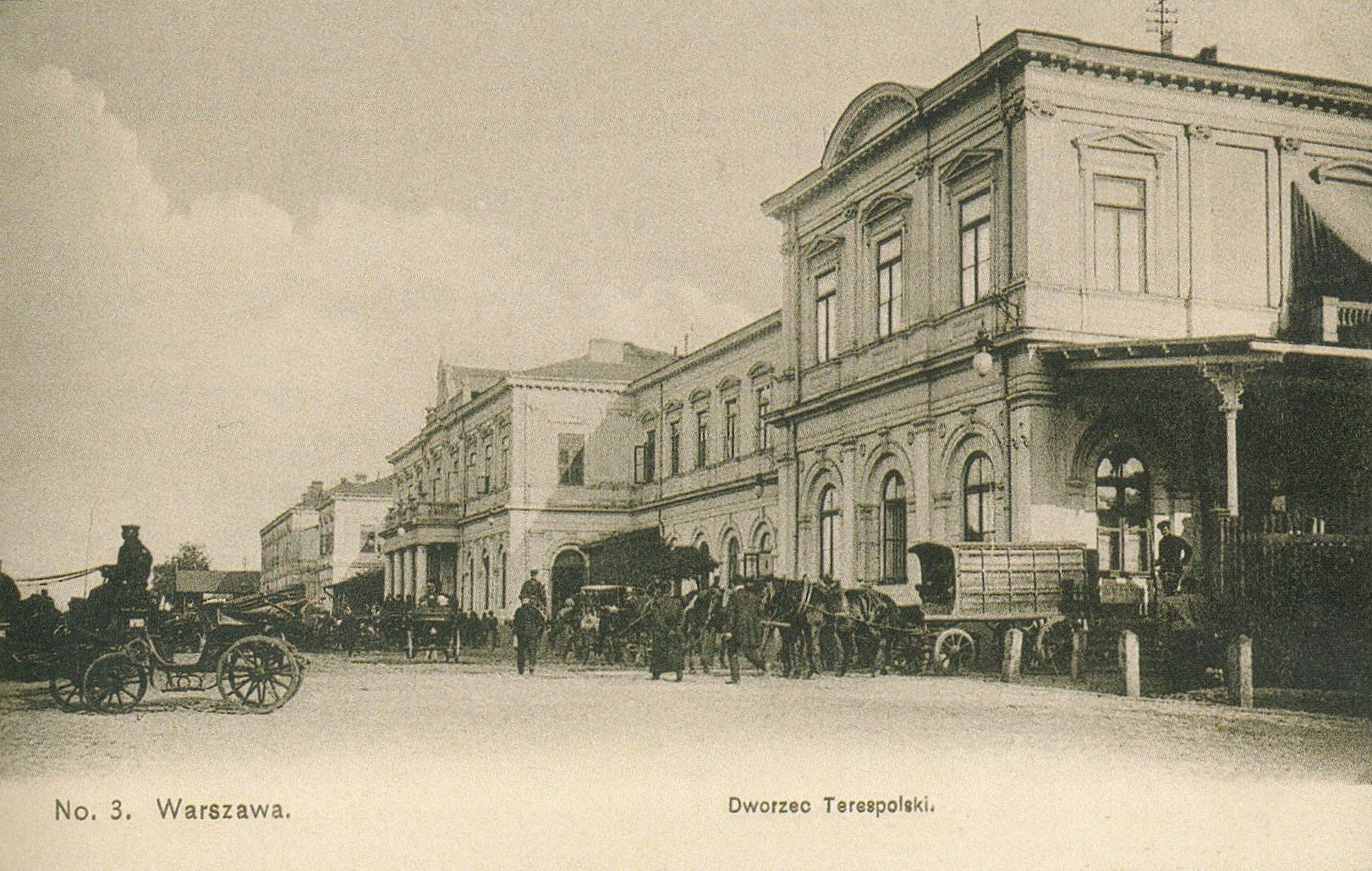
Warsaw Terespol Railway station

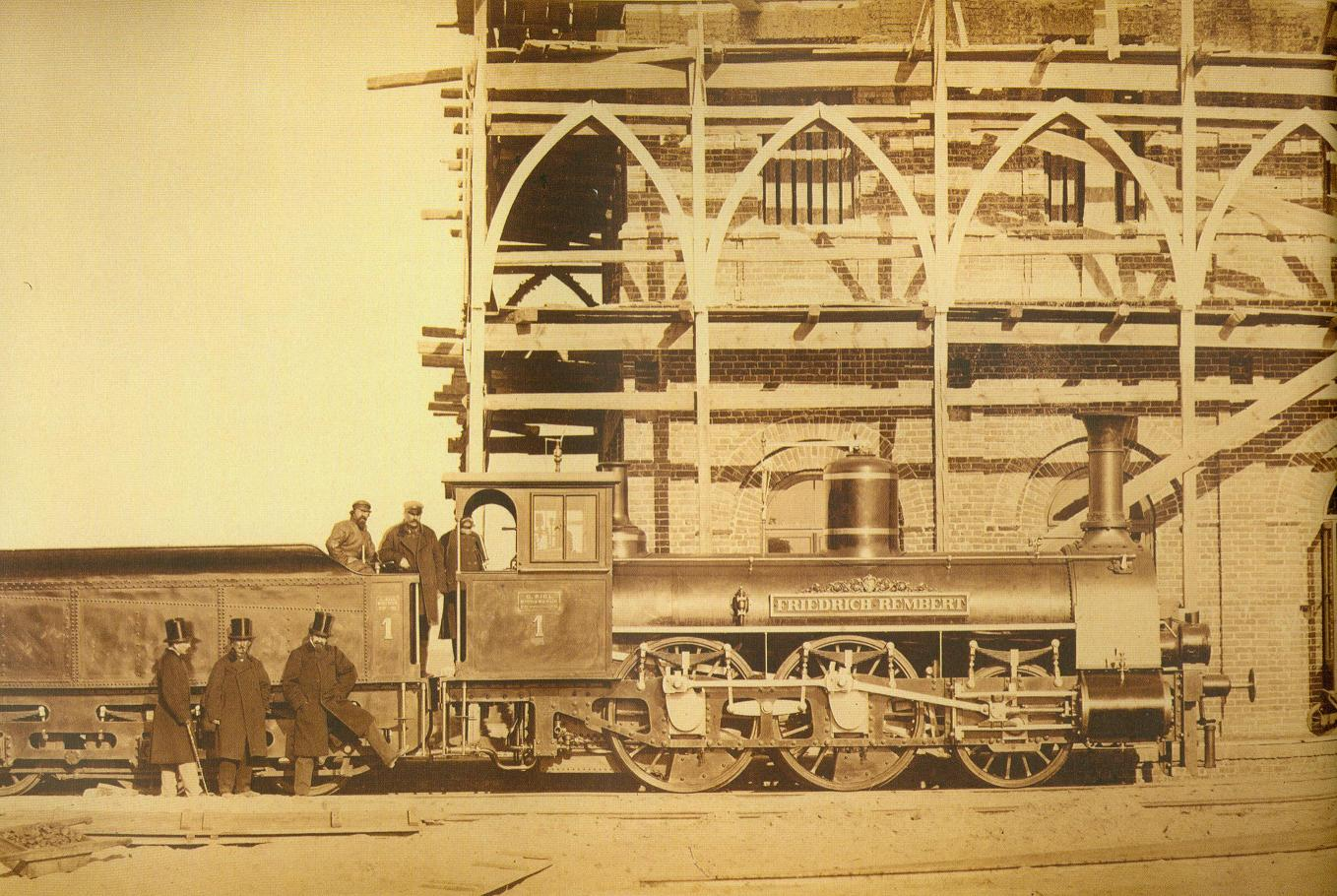
Construction of Warsaw Terespol Railway station in 1866

First concrete plans for the creation of a railway line linking Warsaw (which as a result of the Partitions of Poland for most of the 19th century was under Russian rule as part of the so-called Congress Poland) with Moscow appeared by the end of the 1850s. In 1864 a concession was granted to one of the companies interested in the project and construction work began in 1865. In 1866 trains started running on the first-opened segment between Warsaw and Siedlce, and in 1867 the entire line from Warsaw to Terespol was officially inaugurated. Four years later a bridge was built across the Bug river along with a 5 kilometres (3.1 mi) long line linking Terespol with Brest-Litovsk (Polish: Brześć Litewski, today Bierascie in Belarus), in the part of Poland annexed by Russia earlier in the Third Partition of Poland, thus connecting the railroad with an existing line running to Moscow.

The Warsaw − Terespol railway was the third railway line to reach Warsaw, following the Warsaw–Vienna railway in 1845 and Warsaw – Saint Petersburg railway in 1862. At the time of construction, the whole railway was in Russia, as Warsaw was in the Russian partition of Poland, built to Russian gauge. The line did not reach Warsaw proper, instead ending in the borough Praga on the right bank of the Vistula river, as the time the occupation authorities for strategic purposes blocked the construction of heavy railway bridges across the river. A rail bridge was built later, in 1877, along with the Vistula River Railroad and the Warsaw Circumferal Line connecting the city's rail terminals.

In 1891 the company was nationalized by the Russian government and in 1897 was merged with the Vistula River Railroad. After World War I started in 1914 the line was largely heavily damaged by the retreating Russians and later partly restored and converted to standard gauge by occupying Germans for military use. It was again briefly switched over to the Russian gauge by Russians during the Polish-Bolshevik War in 1920.

During the interbellum, in the newly independent Second Republic of Poland, the rebuilt railway was placed under the administration of the Polish State Railways which operates the entire national rail network. In 1933 the Warsaw Cross-City Line was built, along with a tunnel under the city center, directly linking the former Warsaw Terespol rail terminal (now Warsaw East railway station) with the new Warsaw Main railway station built in place of the old Warsaw Vienna terminal. In 1937 a segment of tracks from Warsaw to Mińsk Mazowiecki was electrified. The rest of the line to Terespol, where the post World War II border between Poland and the Soviet Union was set, was electrified in the 1970s.

In the 2000s the entire line was modernized, allowing conventional passenger rail at speed of 160 km/h and heavy freight at 120 km/h.

== Stations ==
International trains stop at:

- Warszawa Centralna (0 km)
- Warszawa Wschodnia (4 km)
- Mińsk Mazowiecki (40 km)
- Siedlce (92 km)
- Łuków (120 km)
- Międzyrzec Podlaski (148 km)
- Biała Podlaska (172 km)
- Małaszewicze (201 km)
- Terespol (209 km)

Belarus–Poland border (211 km)

- Brest Central (215 km)

The travel time is around 3 hours Warszaw–Terespol, but it takes 2 hours more to Brest, due to the border control and bogie exchange since the international trains continue to Moscow (there is one hour time zone difference at the Poland-Belarus border).
