= Railway electrification in Poland =

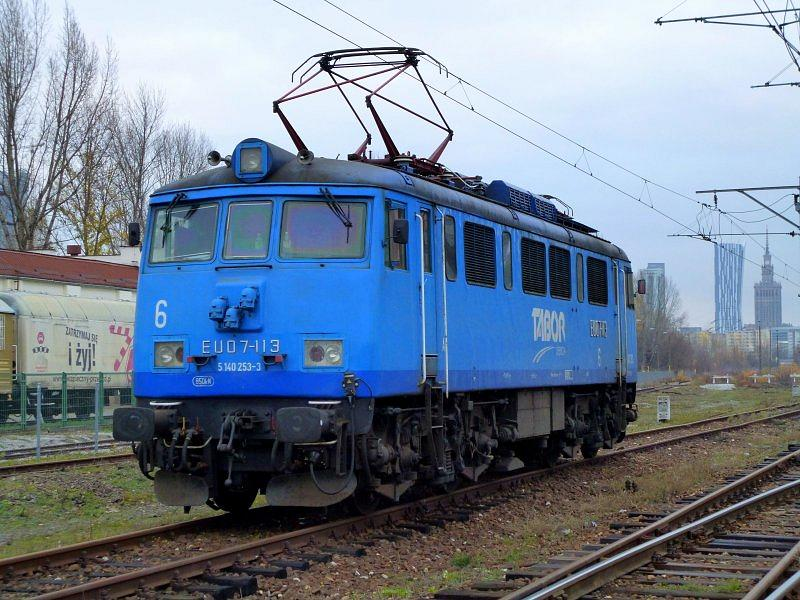
The PKP class EU07 is a popular electric locomotive on Polish railroads, used by national and private carriers. Visible on the picture is a locomotive belonging to Tabor Dębica.

Railway electrification in Poland is the process aimed at increasing the efficiency of railways and improving the railway services offered by supplying Polish railways with electricity and implementing electric rolling stock, which replaces rolling stock with other drives, mainly conventional diesel traction (in the past it was also steam traction). By the end of the 1970s, thanks to massive electrification and the introduction of a large amount of electric rolling stock into service, it allowed to replace a large number of steam locomotives and older diesel rolling stock. Despite the abandonment of works in the 90s, currently PKP and other entities managing the railway infrastructure, such as PKM or DSDiK, are working on the implementation or are already implementing the electrification of their lines. Currently, the electrification of railways in Poland is aimed at improving rail transport by increasing competitiveness and attractiveness and replacing diesel traction of national importance and saving fuel on regional lines and railways mains such as line 31 from Siedlce to Siemianówka, line 137 from Kędzierzyn-Koźle to Legnica and line 203 from Tczew to Kostrzyn.

The electric railways in Poland are powered by 3 kV DC and the length of electrified lines is over 12,236 km. The share of electric rolling stock in Poland is over 84.3%.

== Early electrifications under German rule ==
The first plans for the electrification of railways in Poland appeared before the outbreak of World War I, but works on the electrification of railways in the contemporary Polish lands was started by the Germans starting on August 15, 1897, the construction of an electrified railway line in the city of Wąbrzeźno. The railway line was put into use on April 1, 1898, and it was the first electric railway in Poland, and the line itself was of a suburban nature. In 1914 at Lower Silesia electrifying and opening the railway line from Szczawienka to the Czech Meziměstí on 15 kV AC system. In the same year, the Jugowice - Walim railway line was also opened. In the following years, the number of electrified railway lines in Lower Silesia grew, thanks to which it was possible to run electric trains from Wrocław via Wałbrzych, Jelenia Góra to Węgliniec as well as Zgorzelec and Leśna. Until the 1939, over 391.87 km of railway lines were electrified in Lower Silesia. Further works were suspended due to the outbreak of World War II.

== Second Polish Republic ==
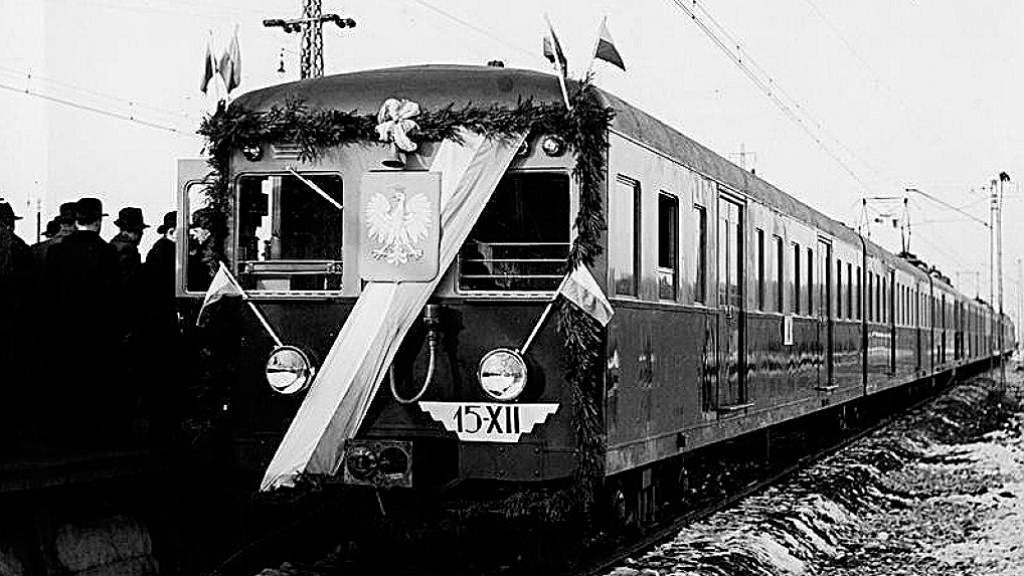
The ceremonial opening of the electrified line in Józefów. 15 December 1936.

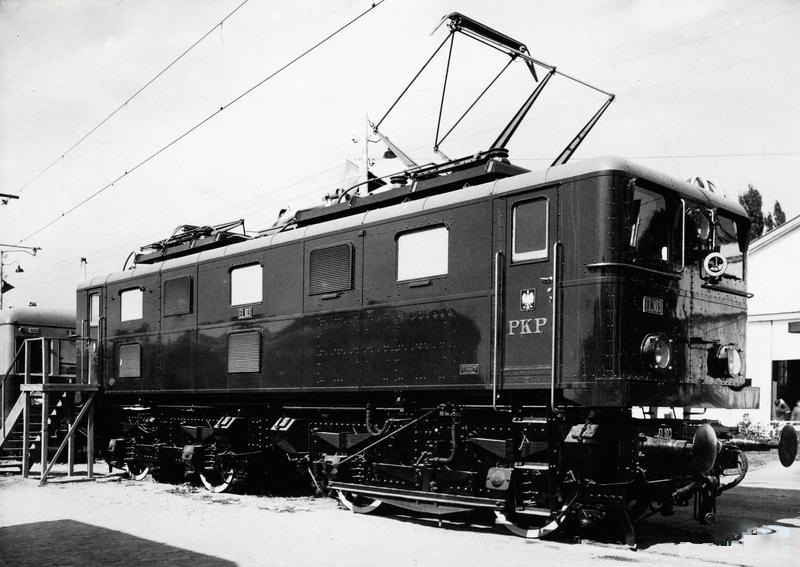
EL.100 series (later EP01) were produced by English Electric and were the first electric locomotives purchased by PKP

At the request of the Government Commission, professor R. Podoski developed a project for the electrification of railways in Poland, which included the electrification of the Warsaw Junction Kolejowy and the electrification of the Warsaw – Kraków – Katowice, Warsaw – Przemyśl – Lviv lines. In 1921, according to the request of prof. Roman Podoski, a bold decision was made at that time that the electrification would be a modern DC system with a voltage of 3000 V, not widely used at that time. so a small number of them) and allowed for the collection of energy in the form of 3-phase current from existing power plants. In 1926, for financial reasons, there was a standstill in works, in 1928 a detailed schedule of works was adopted for the years 1928 to 1931, providing for the commissioning of the electrified cross-city line in November 1931.

In the years 1925–1927, thanks to the support of English capital, a line managed by the carrier from Warsaw to Grodzisk Mazowiecki was built on the basis of a concession for a section from Warsaw to Żyrardów, issued to industrialists from Łódź, who - interested in the project - relinquished it to EKD. The EKD was made available to passengers on December 11, 1927.

At the beginning of 1931, the Ministry of Communications turned to larger foreign enterprises dealing with electric traction for offers for the electrification of the Warsaw cross-city line with a variant of electrification of suburban traffic on three lines, on credit terms. At the request of the Ministry, 17 offers were received, the comparison of which confirmed the advisability of electrification of the rail with 3 kV direct current, but the proposed credit terms were unacceptable. It is interesting that there was no offer from England among them, even though, as it turns out, the electrification was carried out by English companies.

On August 2, 1933, PKP concluded an agreement with two English companies: The English Electric Company and Metropolitan Vickers Electrical Company, with experience in the construction of 3 kV devices, for the implementation of the first stage of electrification of WKW within 4 years on credit terms.

The Warszawa Wschodnia – Otwock section was ready on August 14, 1936, and on December 15 of that year, the trains on the section from Otwock to Pruszków were officially launched.

In 1937, electric trains were launched on the section Pruszków – Grodzisk Mazowiecki. On September 6, on the section Grodzisk Mazowiecki – Żyrardów, on December 15, on the last section scheduled for electrification in the first stage, that is, from Warszawa Wschodnia to Mińsk Mazowiecki.

For the maintenance and repair of electric rolling stock, initially consisting of 6, and later 10 4-axle electric locomotives of the English EL 100 and Polish EL 200 series and 76 wagon unbalanced electric multiple units, popularly known as 91000 and 92000 series units, and a few years after the war as EW51 and EW52 for those refurbished in East Germany, was built in West Warsaw at Armatnia Street, the Main Electrotraction Workshop with an adjacent power plant in Grochów.

Further electrification plans were interrupted by the outbreak of World War II.

== Communist era ==
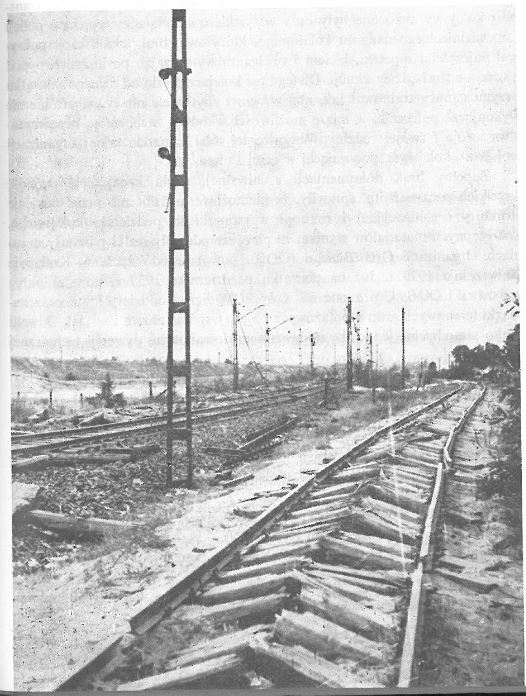
Destroyed railway infrastructure near Warsaw by retreating German forces in 1945

=== Post-war condition ===
After the end of hostilities, the railway infrastructure was in a very bad condition. Due to the terrible condition of the economy, especially the electrotechnical industry, it was impossible to undertake the production of rolling stock in the country. Already at the end of the 1940s, the planning of further electrification of the lines, including the Coal Main from Chorzów to Tczew, began, but at that time this was not possible. However, the reconstruction of the pre-war traction network at the Warsaw railway junction was undertaken. In addition, shortly after the end of the war, the German traction network in Lower Silesia, except for the Jugowice-Walim railway line, was completely liquidated, on which the traction network remained at 1000 V DC for some time.

Already in 1945, equipment for the Brwinów substation and two mobile substations assembled on railway vehicles were ordered from the Swedish concern ASEA. At the beginning of 1946, preliminary talks were started with the ASEA concern regarding the conclusion of a loan agreement for large deliveries of electrotraction equipment for the Warsaw node. The Swedish delivery was to include 44 three-car electric multiple units, 8 BoBo electric locomotives, complete equipment of 6 traction substations and section cabins, and equipment for remote control electric system control room. The contract was signed on April 16, 1947.

The electric policy is not yet the preparatory period, but steam traction was almost electric. There was resistance or what is complemented by the entries for the correction of this transaction on the entry transaction record. The effectiveness of the Railway Electrification Office has developed in practice:

- Efficiency Reconstruction of the pre-war state and further electrification of suburban traffic in WWK
- Electrification of urban and suburban traffic on the Gdańsk Coast, i.e. in the Tri-City Gdańsk – Sopot – Gdynia
- Electrification of the Warsaw – Częstochowa – Katowice – Gliwice line with a branch to Łódź and Kraków

Complementary ASEA mobile substations, periodically constructed for the construction of 1948. The queue first passed to replace substations and missions, which prevent the operation of traffic to Warsaw East - Mińsk Mazowiecki. The trains started from Warszawa Wschodnia station to Miłosny 3 February, and to Mińsk Mazowiecki on March 14, 1948. At the turn of 1947 and 1948, technical possibilities of technical problems related to technical problems on the market, problems related to PKP with breakthrough capital due to the traditions of the interwar period. Due to the future electrification of the GWK using the standard voltage of 3 kV direct current for PKP, it was decided to build a traction network with dimensions and insulation typical for a voltage of 3 kV. Direct current with a voltage of 800 V was to be provided by traction substations, for which equipment was ordered in United Kingdom at the turn of 1947 and 1948.

In the years 1948–1951, the electrification of the lines on the Coast from Gdańsk to Sopot was carried out, on which the traction network was put into service in 1951–1952. The rolling stock operated on the line were electric multiple units of the EW90, EW91 and EW92 series, imported from the Berlin S-Bahn as part of war reparations. In the following years, from 1953 to 1957, further fragments of the Tricity line from Sopot through Gdynia to Wejherowo were electrified.

=== 1952–1963 ===
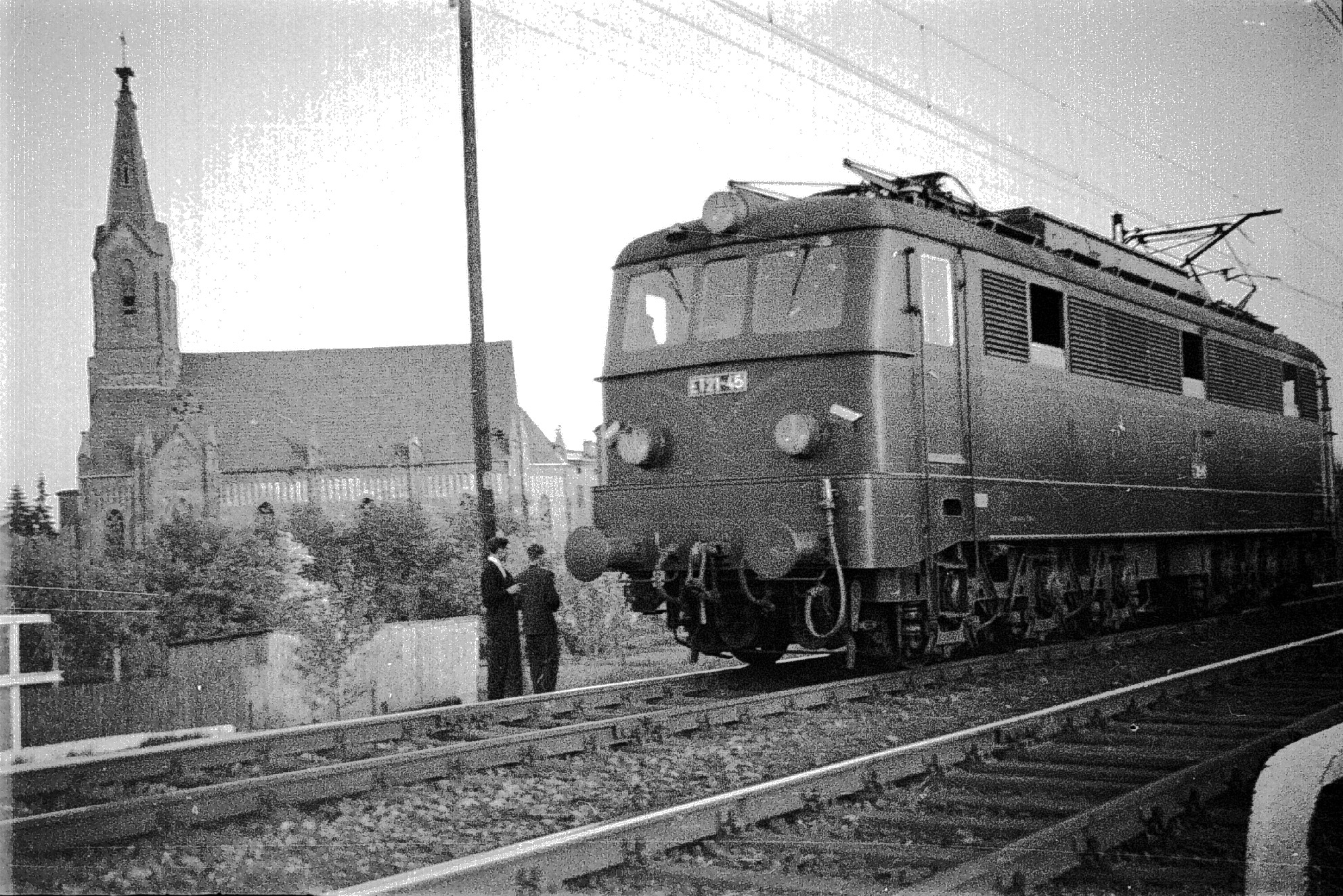
First electric locomotive PKP class ET21 in Radomsko

From 1952, the pace of electrification of railway lines in Poland gained momentum. On March 14, 1952, the railway line from Warszawa Wileńska to Zielonka was electrified. On the same day, the traction network from Zielonka to Tłuszcz was put into use. At the turn of 1957–1958, the electrification of the line from Otwock to Pilawa was completed.

On September 10, 1954, the first electric train from Warsaw arrived in Łódź, entering the Łódź Fabryczna station.

In 1955, the Piotrków Trybunalski – Częstochowa section was electrified, but the first electric train arrived in Częstochowa on January 21, 1956. A few months later, on May 1, electric trains began to reach Zawiercie. On June 3, the traction network for Łazy was put into operation. Then, until 1957, the railway line from Łazy to Gliwice was electrified. After the Warsaw – Gliwice main line was fully commissioned in 1957, the speed of electric trains - compared to steam trains - increased for passenger trains from 40.8 to 65.3 km / h, and for freight trains - from 29 to 49 km / h. Compared to the operation with steam traction, 60% carbon savings and significant savings in wagons were achieved. Rail transport between Silesia and Warsaw has been improved for a long time.

The obtained investment and operational experience related to the first main line and the WWK electrification allowed the Ministry of Communications to develop general assumptions for the electrification of railways in Poland, which were used, among others, by to make a significant decision by the minister to abandon the purchase of steam locomotives for PKP from 1957. It is worth adding that during its construction, a practically large team of specialists was educated for the electrification of subsequent railway routes. In the area of the Łódź junction, the Bedoń - Łódź Olechów - Łódź Kaliska and Łódź Widzew - Łodź Chojny connections with a total length of 26 km were electrified (January 25, 1958). In this way, it was possible to connect three most important stations of the Łódź agglomeration by electric traction. (Widzew, Chojny, Łódź Kaliska) In the years 1961–1962, the electrification of the very important Warsaw-Poznań bus began. On March 22, 1961, 71 km electrified section Sochaczew - Łowicz - Kutno was put into operation. On the 29 September 1962 section Kutno - Konin 79 km, electrification thus reached the area of DOKP Poznań.

Ongoing plans for the electrification of the PKP network include the main lines connecting Upper Silesia with the developing Kraków district and connecting Upper Silesia with Lower Silesia, i.e. with the Wrocław district. The following set of lines were among those electrified and commissioned:

- Katowice – Szczakowa 22 km, May 14, 1959
- Ząbkowice – Szczakowa 16 km, April 30, 1959
- Szczakowa – Mydlinki – Kraków Płaszów 59 km, September 29, 1959,

The necessity to improve and increase the railway transport capacity on the Upper Silesia - Wrocław communication route formed the basis of government decisions regarding the modernization and electrification of the Gliwice - Pyskowice – Opole – Wrocław railway line. The electrification of this trunk was carried out in stages, the entire trunk line was commissioned by electric traction on the following dates:

- Gliwice – Pyskowice – Strzelce Opolskie (along with the second pair of tracks on the section Gliwice – Łabędy) – Opole Główna – Święta Katarzyna – Wrocław Brochów 158 km on 3 October 1960.
- Święta Katarzyna – Wrocław Główny 10 km on December 15, 1960,

In 1961, additional connections in the Opole area were electrified: Groszowice - Opole Główna Towarowe (3 km) and Groszowice - Opole Wschodnie (6 km). In 1962, the section Brochów - Wrocław Towarowy (3 km) was additionally electrified in the area of Wrocław. The electrification investment Gliwice - Wrocław also includes the electrification of branches along the Odra River: Gliwice - Łabędy - Kędzierzyn - Groszowice (83 km).

In the Katowice junction itself, in 1961, the suburban section Katowice - Katowice Ligota - Tychy - Tychy Miasto was electrified. In 1962, the following sections were put into operation by electric traction:

- Podłęże – Bogumiłowice, 51 km, April 28, 1962.
- Bogumiłowice – Tarnów Zachodni 4 km

In 1959, the traction network on the Jugowice Walim railway line was liquidated along with passenger traffic, which was served by steam locomotives for a few more months, and was finally liquidated by 1960. Freight traffic on this line was served until 1975, and the line itself was dismantled in 1984.

The EP02 series electric locomotives (1953–1954) and three-car electric multiple units of the EW53 series (1953–1955), intended for WWK, were built in Pafawag Wrocław with the use of electrical equipment purchased in England. In 1957, 2 prototypes were built, and in 1958, serial production of the locomotives began based on the Soviet technical documentation, ET21. In 1958, a prototype of the domestic three-car EMU (EW55 series) was built for suburban traffic with adaptation to high platforms, and in the years 1958–1962 a series of these vehicles was delivered for WWK. In 1962, the first three-car multiple unit for local traffic was built, with the same equipment as the EW55, but adapted to low platforms, the EN57 series. On the other hand, the demand for electric locomotives for servicing long-distance passenger trains was covered by the intervention purchase of 30 BoBo electric locomotives in CSRS (EU05 series). A contract was also concluded for the delivery from England of 20 BoBo electric locomotives (EU06 series) with full production documentation.

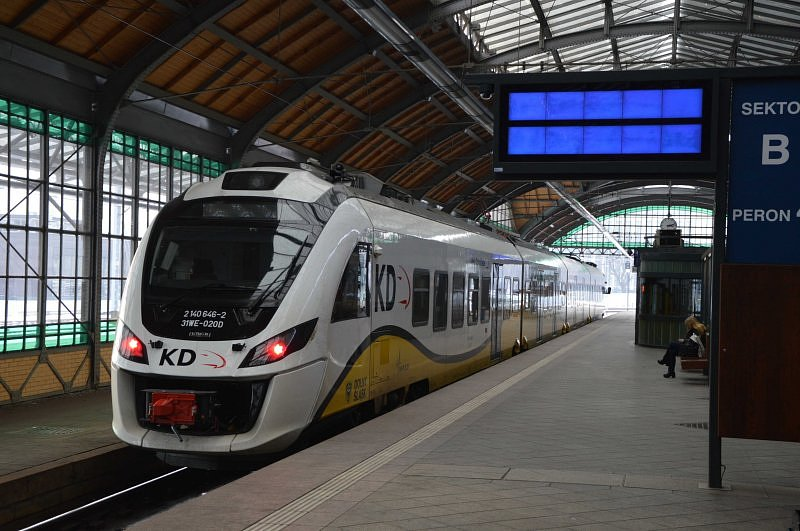
31WE Lower Silesian Railways train at Wrocław Główny

=== 1963–1971 ===
In 1964, the electrification of the last part of the Kraków - Medyka line was completed, which had been going on since 1960 (in 1963 the Tarnów Zachodni - Dębica - Rzeszów section was electrified, and the final section Rzeszów - Medyka in 1964). On June 6, 1964, the electrification of the entire length of the Warsaw - Poznań line (after the Konin - Poznań section was electrified) started in 1958. Together with the electrified sections of Łowicz - Skierniewice (22 km - May 25, 1963) and Odolany - Warszawa Gdańska - Warszawa Praga (14 km - May 25, 1963), it constituted the electrification of an important route for the east–west direction, linking two electrified main lines Warsaw - Katowice and Warsaw - Poznań. On November 29, 1963, the electric traction connection of Katowice through Ligota - Tychy - Czechowice with Bielsko (38 km) was launched, extended on December 30, 1970, by the Bielsko - Żywiec section (21 km). On September 9, 1964, it took place on the section Czechowice - Zebrzydowice - state border (37 km). On December 19, 1966, electric traction was introduced along the entire length of the Wrocław - Wałbrzych - Jelenia Góra line (151 km); on the section Wrocław - Kuźnice Świdnickie a year earlier - December 18, 1965. It is the first electrified line of the PKP network of a piedmont character. From that moment, also in Lower Silesia, parts of the lines on which the traction network were located before the war were re-electrified.

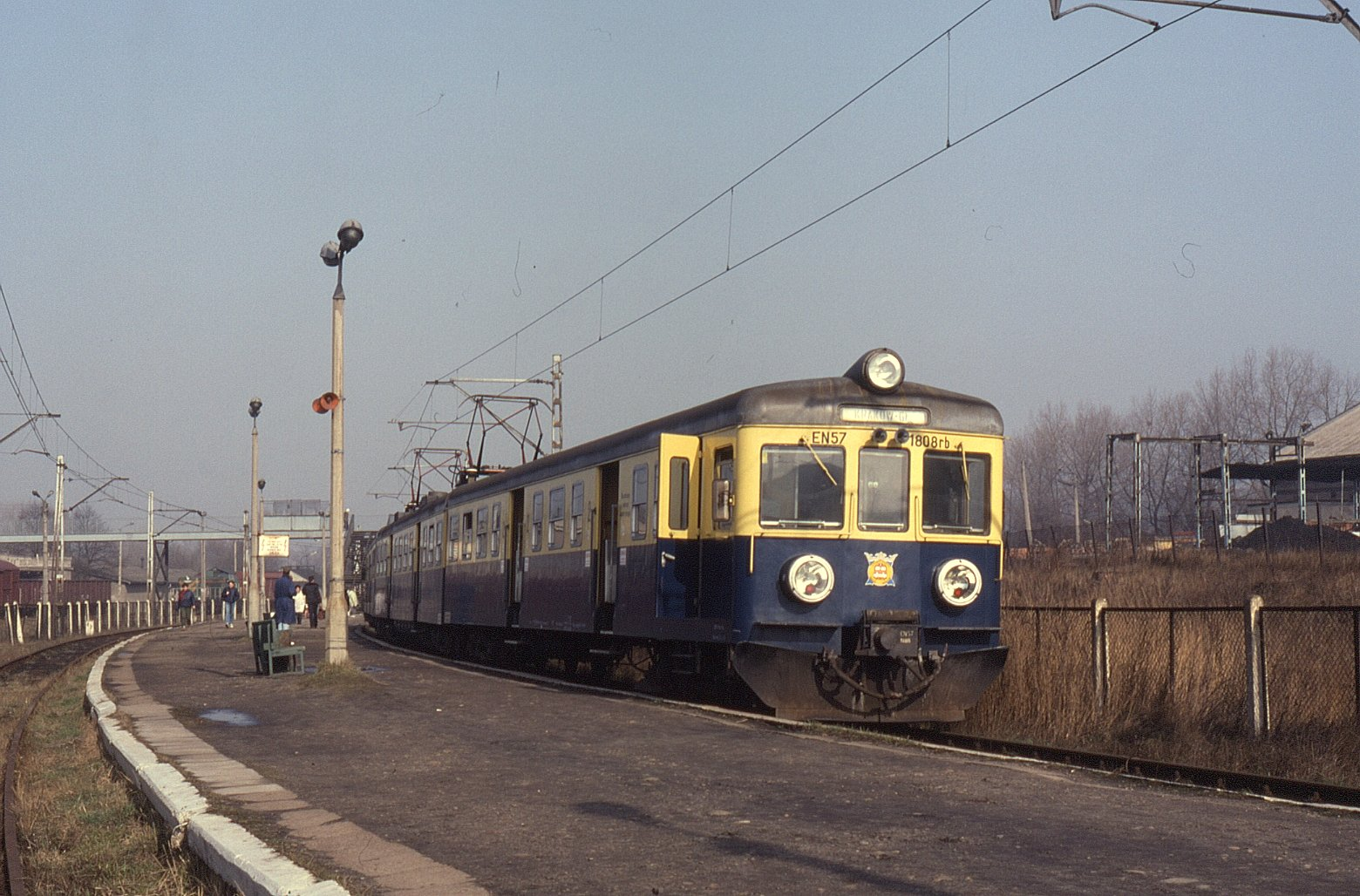
EN57-1808 at the railway station in Wieliczka on 22 March 1994. The EN57s classes of this type became a symbol of rail electrification in the period of the Polish People's Republic.

The next important electrified route was the Śląsk - Lublin main railway line with connections towards Kraków (Batowice - Tunel section) and Warsaw (from Radom to Czachówek and from Dęblin to Pilawa), electrified in stages and launched on the following dates:

- Strzemieszyce – Sędziszów 98 km, September 8, 1966.
- Sędziszów – Kielce 66 km, September 29, 1967,

Launching the supplementary sections, forming the shortest connection, was as follows:

- Tunel – Batowice 46 km September 22, 1968
- Czachówek – Radom 70 km

By the resolution of the Council of Ministers of February 21, 1963, the electrification of the Coal Main was officially started. The first completed section was Tarnowskie Góry - Zduńska Wola Karsznice, the electrification of which was completed on November 28, 1965. The second section from Zduńska Wola to Maksymilianowo has been divided into stages: Zduńska Wola Karsznice - Lipie Góry, Lipie Góry - Inowrocław, Inowrocław - Maksymilianowo along with the electrification of the Bydgoszcz Railway Junction and Maksymilianowo - Tczew (and further to Gdynia by line Warsaw–Gdańsk railway). These stages were completed on May 30, 1966, December 30, 1966, September 9, 1967, and December 23, 1968, respectively. Due to electrification, line 131 took over 70% of the freight transport of DOKP Gdańsk. The reduction in travel costs resulted in a return on investment after 5 years. The introduction of electric traction also resulted in changes in the workshops of the locomotive shed and the creation of a control point for electric locomotives in Karsznice. The electrification of the bus was completed on May 23, 1974, when the last section from Chorzów Batory to Tarnowskie Góry was electrified. The total length of electrified lines under this project was 714 km.

As soon as the 3kV direct current electrification system reached Gdynia, the voltage was switched from 800 V to 3000 V on the Gdynia Stocznia - Wejcherowo section (23 km) (October 19, 1969). At the same time, the voltage was also switched from 800 V to 3000 V on the Gdańsk Gł. - Gdańsk Nowy Port section. The separate electric traction system 800 V on the Gdańsk - Gdynia route was liquidated on December 20, 1976. The power supply was switched to 3000 V and the system was unified in the GWK. Thus, the operation of the post-German 800 V electric rolling stock operated on the Coast lasted 25 years, instead of the initially anticipated 10 years.

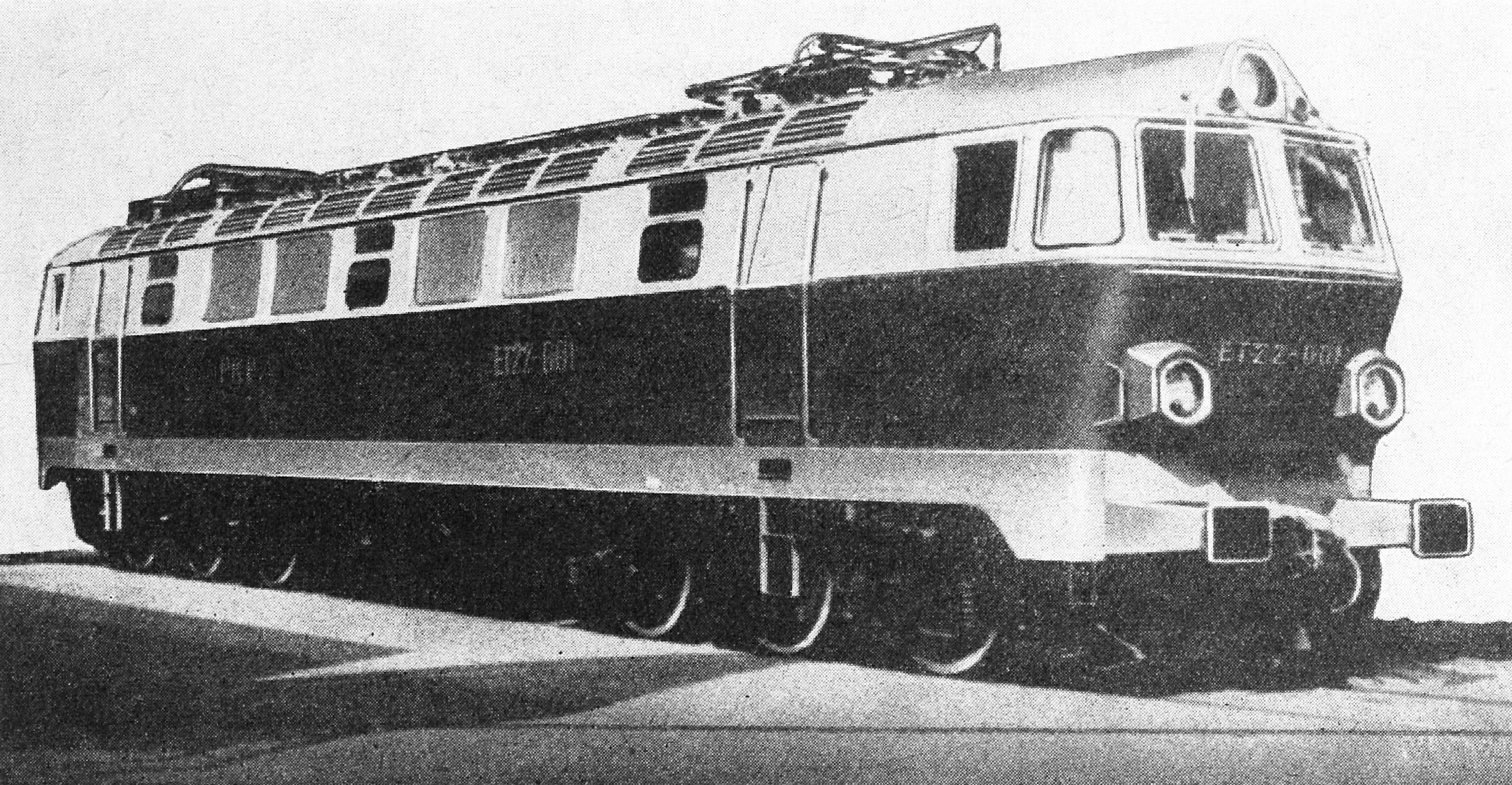
The prototype of the ET22 locomotive was produced in 1969, and in 1971 this vehicle entered mass production, thanks to which, with a high continuous power of 3000 kW, it could replace steam and diesel locomotives on electrified lines.

In the period 1969–1970, an electric traction was put into operation on the Wrocław - Poznań line, 165 km long, and 198 km including slip roads (September 24, 1970). In addition, in the first decade of the period in question, the following lines or sections of the PKP network were electrified, starting to operate trains with electric traction:

- Łódź Widzew – Zgierz 14 km, December 23, 1969,

From the 1960s, the domestic industry at a rapid pace began to provide new electric locomotives and electric multiple units, which allowed a large part to replace steam locomotives, which in the late 1970s began to be phased out in favor of diesel locomotives on non-electrified lines. In addition to the mass-scale introduction of the domestic ET22, EU07 and two-section ET41 locomotives, Polish State Railways also purchased two-section locomotives of the ET40 series in Czechoslovakia, which were produced by Skoda, and in the Soviet Union Novocherkassk Electric Locomotive Plant, locomotives of the ET42 series were purchased, which were one of the strongest series at the Polish State Railways.

=== 1972–1979 ===
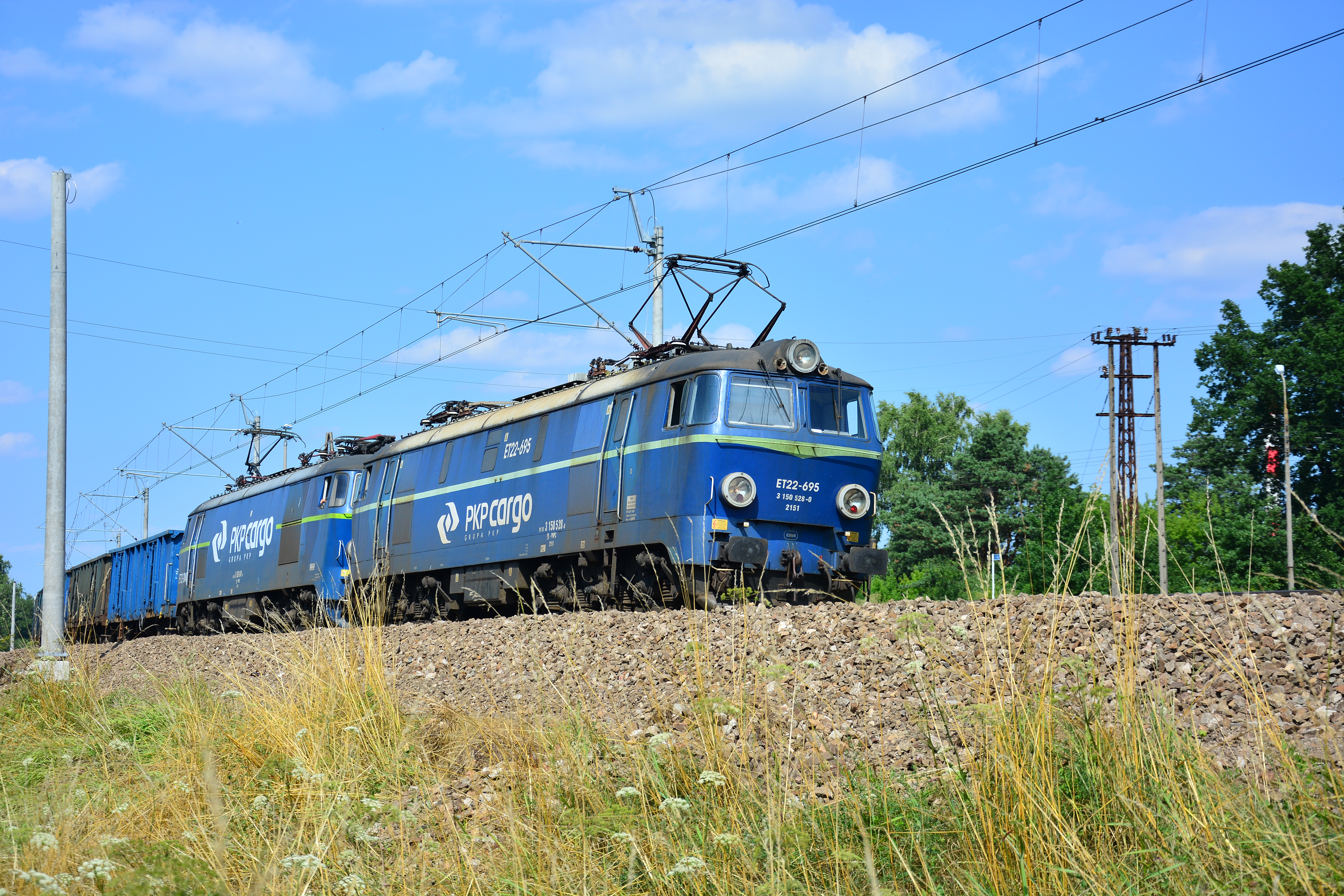
A train consisting of both locomotives of the PKP class ET22 in Skarżysko Kamienna in July 2015

In the years 1973 - 1982 many important lines and communication routes were electrified. On October 15, 1973, the electric traction was started on the Paczyna - Lubliniec - Herby line (55 km), on December 29, 1973 - on the Kozłów - Koniecpol - Kielce line (44 km), built in 1971, and on December 4, 1974 - on the Częstochowa - Koniecpol - Kielce line (114 km). The Koniecpol - Częstochowa section was put into operation by electric traction a year earlier (December 29, 1973). An electrified large northern bypass of the Katowice junction was created, constituting an element of fundamental importance in the transport service of the areas adjacent to industrial Silesia and the Częstochowa region in the system of the electrified PKP network.

On December 30, 1974, the electrified Częstochowa - Wyczerpy - Siemkowice line (48 km) was put into operation, constituting a direct connection between the Częstochowa junction and the Tarnowskie Góry coal main - ports in Gdańsk and Gdynia. On December 2, 1975, the staged electrification of the Zduńska Wola - Ostrów Wlkp. - Oleśnica line (171 km) was completed. Zduńska Wola - Sieradz section (17 km) - 30.IX.1975 This way an electrified communication route from Warsaw through Łódź Kaliska, Ostrów Wlkp., Pleśnica to Wrocław was created. A direct electric traction connection was made between the economic regions of Wrocław, Wałbrzych and Jelenia Góra with Warsaw.

On December 2, 1975, electric traction began on the Kraków - Zakopane line (135 km). The Kraków - Skawina section was commissioned on November 12, 1970, and Skawina - Sucha Beskidzka on July 17, 1974. The commissioning of this old railway line, connecting the winter capital of Poland with the rest of the country, was commissioned by electric traction. If the construction of slip roads designed in the areas of Sucha and Chabówka stations (change of the train's head) had not been abandoned, the improvement of traffic would have been even greater.

On December 31, 1974, electric trains began to operate along the entire length of the Tarnowskie Góry - Kalety - Kluczbork - Ostrów Wlkp. - Jarocin - Poznań route (203 km). On the section Kluczbork - Ostrów Wlkp. Electric traction started earlier, i.e. on September 7, 1973. The electrification of the above-mentioned line created a second electric connection between Silesia and Poznań, and soon electric traction was introduced for further elements of port routes: Poznań - Inowrocław (101 km ) on December 14, 1976, and Jarocin - Gniezno (65 km)

In the years 1975 - 1977, electric trains were introduced according to the given dates also on the following lines (sections):

- Koluszki - Żakowice - Tomaszów Maz. - Radzice - Radom 123 km 29 May 1976
- Lubliniec - Opole 60 km., Supplementing the connection Częstochowa - Herby - Opole on December 18, 1976.

In the years 1971–1976, the central railway line was built, the CMK line was electrified in stages:

- Zawiercie - Włoszczowa 68 km on May 31, 1975.

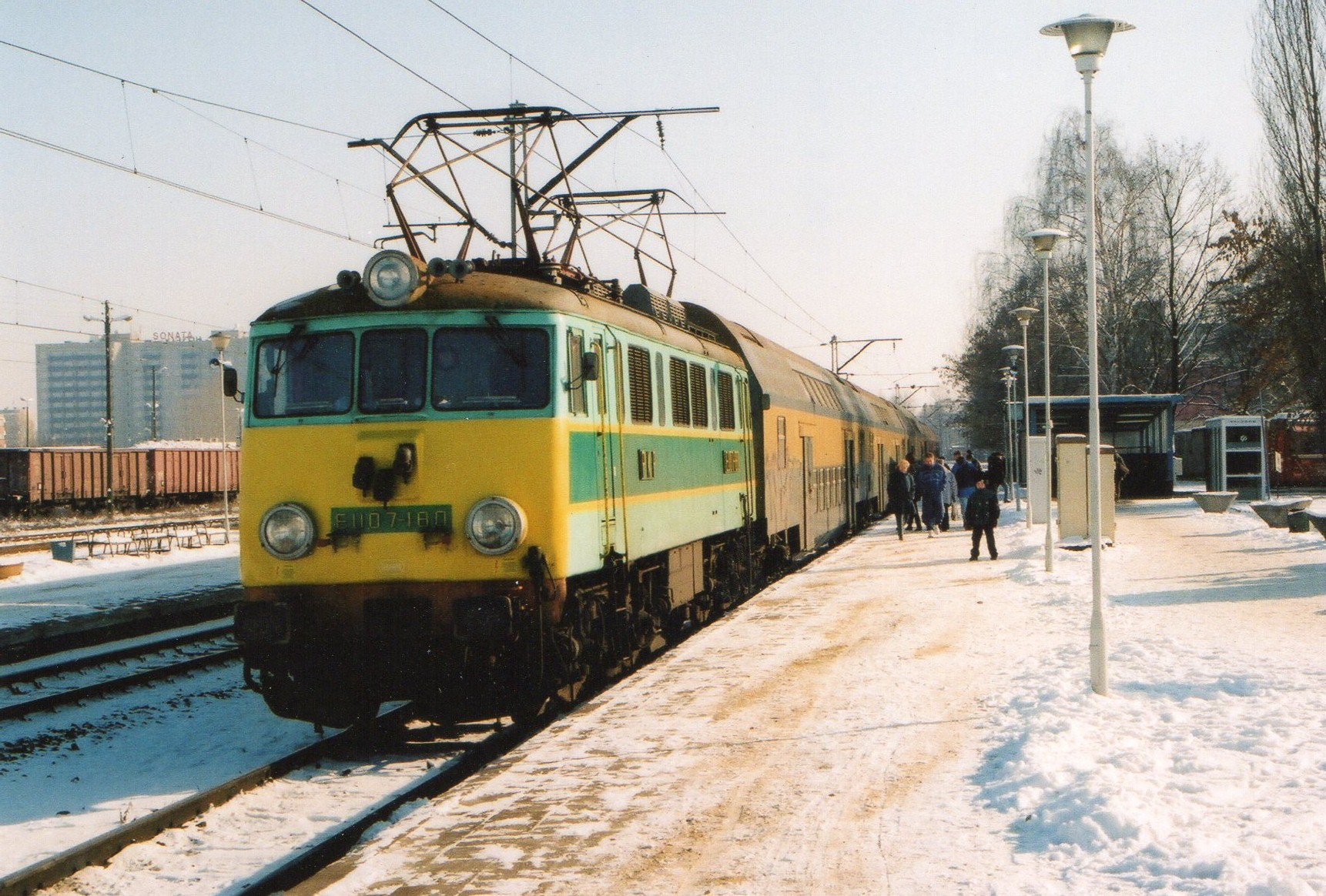
EU07-180 in Konin railway station in February 2001.

In 1978, the phased electrification of another important Poznań-Szczecin main line was completed:

- Poznań - Rokietnica 18 km June 27, 1975.
- Rokietnica - Krzyż 66 km. September 10, 1977.

After a thorough modernization, the Szczecin Dębie - Świnoujście route (101 km) became a two-track line. On December 15, 1980, its electrification was completed (the section Szczecin Dąbie - Goleniów, 23 km was electrified earlier - December 21, 1979) On September 11, 1982, the adjacent electrified connection, Wysoka Kamieńska - Kamień Pomorski, was opened, 17 km.

In the years 1971 - 1981 the electrification of the east–west transit main was extended, the following sections were put into operation:

- Poznań - Zbąszynek 76 km, December 20, 1979.
- Łuków - Biala Podlaska, 52 km, December 20, 1979.

The electrification of the east–west main line covered the dry transhipment port in Małaszewice.

In 1981, the following electrified lines were put into operation:

- Zgierz - Kutno 57 km, 30 May 1981.
- Herby - Wieluń - Kępno 102 km October 24, 1981.

In the years 1981–1982, the line from Warsaw to Białystok and Ostrołęka was electrified including:

- Tłuszcz - Łochów 21 km December 22, 1981.
- Łochów - Małkinia 30 km (direction to Białystok) September 10, 1982.

After a thorough reconstruction and modernization, the electrification of the so-called The 101 km long line on the Odtzanska line Wrocław - Głogów - Zielona Góra - Rzepin - Szczecin Głogów (Wróblin Głogowski) was put into operation on 23 December 1982. This included:

- Lublin - Zemborzyce 9 km April 15, 1976.
- Lublin - Świdnik 12 km, December 20, 1981.
- Trzebinia - Bolęcin, 5 km (in the vicinity of the Kraków junction), June 30, 1982.

Many lines in the area of the Katowice junction were covered by electrification, including:

- Oświęcim - Trzebinia, 25 km, April 30, 1973
- Rudzieniec Gliwicki - Trzonek North, 17 km, the section closing the electrification of the northern bypass of the Katowice junction on 13 February 1976.

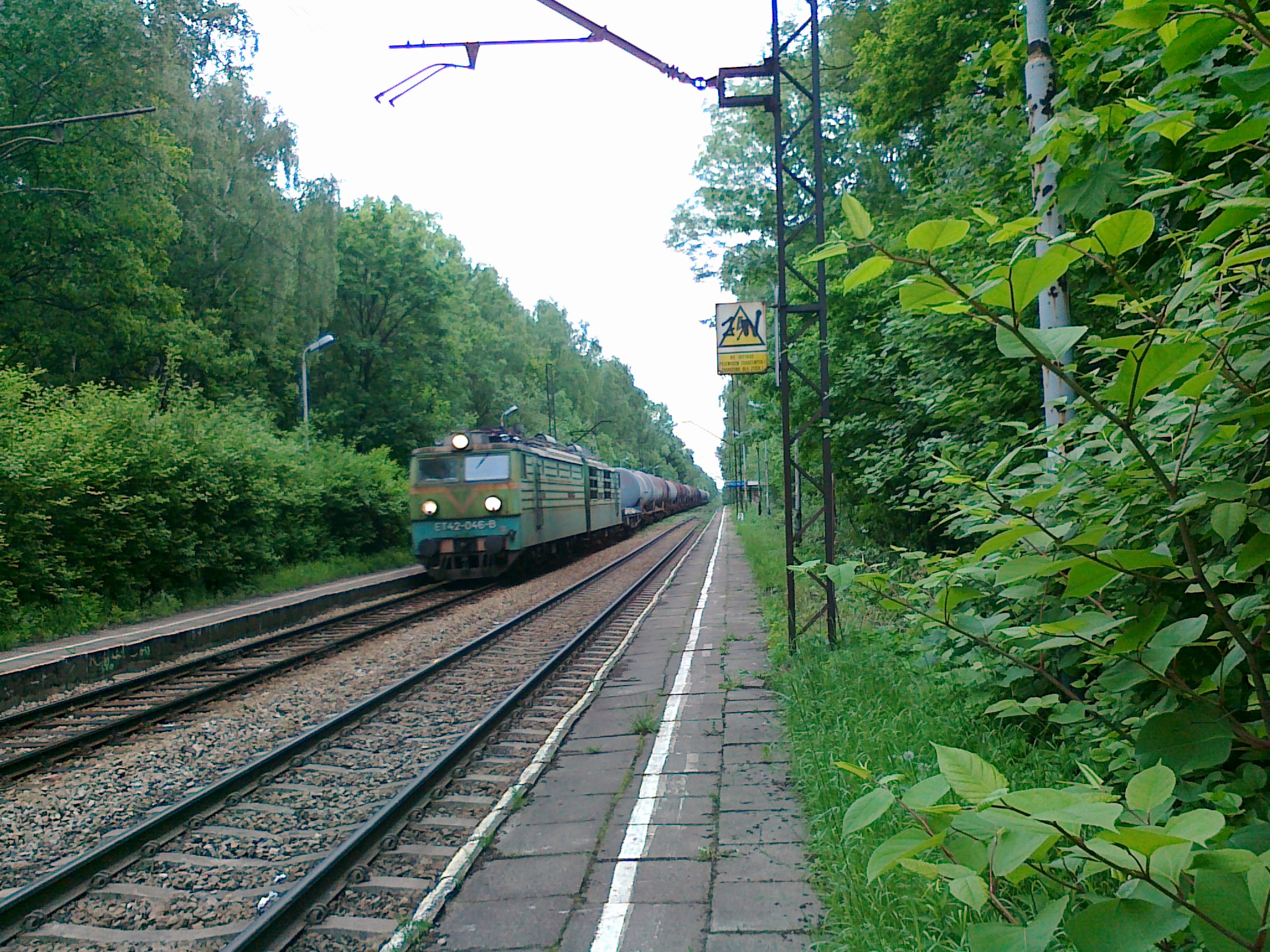
ET42 in Bytom Północ

=== 1980s ===
On October 10, 1983, the electrified section Siedlce - Mordy (19 km) was put into operation. It was the initial stage of electrification of the entire Siedlce - Czeremcha line (91 km) planned for later implementation. The electrification of this line was never completed.

On December 20, 1983, the electric traction was introduced to the section Toruń - Inowrocław (35 km). On May 31, 1984, the section Poznań - Zbąszynek - Rzepin (74 km) was covered by electrification as the last fragment of the great east–west transit main, running from Terespol through Kutno, Poznań to Rzepin station. On June 1, 1984, the electric traction on the Lublin - Dorohusk line was put into operation, the first section of which was already electrified from Lublin to Świdnik. On the section Świdnik - Chełm Lub. - Dorohusk (83 km).

On December 29, 1984, the additional electrified section Rejowiec - Żulin (9 km) was put into operation. On July 20, 1984, the Toruń - Bydgoszcz section (45 km) was put into operation by electric traction. It is the last stage of electrification of the Toruń-Bydgoszcz-Inowrocław triangle. On September 30, 1984, the section Florek - Płock Miasto (46 km) was put into operation by electric traction, extended on November 27, 1984, by the section Płock Miasto - Płock Trzepowo (6 km). On December 21, 1985, the electric traction was introduced on the entire line Kutno - Toruń Gł. (106 km) together with the adjacent section of Aleksandrów Kujawski - Ciechocinek (7 km). On the Toruń - Aleksandrów Kujawski (17 km) and Aleksandrów - Ciechocinek (7 km) sections, the electric traction was introduced a little earlier - on May 31, 1985. On May 28, 1985, the electrification of the transport line, which had been going on since 1982, was put into operation Wrocław - Głogów - Zielona Góra - Rzepin - Kostrzyń - Szczecin (342 km)

- Wrocław – Głogów (Wróblin Głogowski) 101 km, December 23, 1982
- Rzepin – Dolna Odra 106 km on May 28, 1985.

On December 9, 1985, electric traction was introduced on the shortest connection between Warsaw and Gdańsk, 235 km long, with simultaneous activation of electric traction on the Malbork - Elbląg (29 km) branch - on July 20, 1985, and in 1986 on the Działdowo - Olsztyn line (83 km). The Tczew - Gdańsk section was already electrified in 1969 as part of the electrification of the coal main line, the Warsaw - Nasielsk section in 1972 as part of the electrification of the WWK region.

- Tczew – Malbork 18 km, September 30, 1983.
- Działdowo – Iława 60 km 19.XII.1985

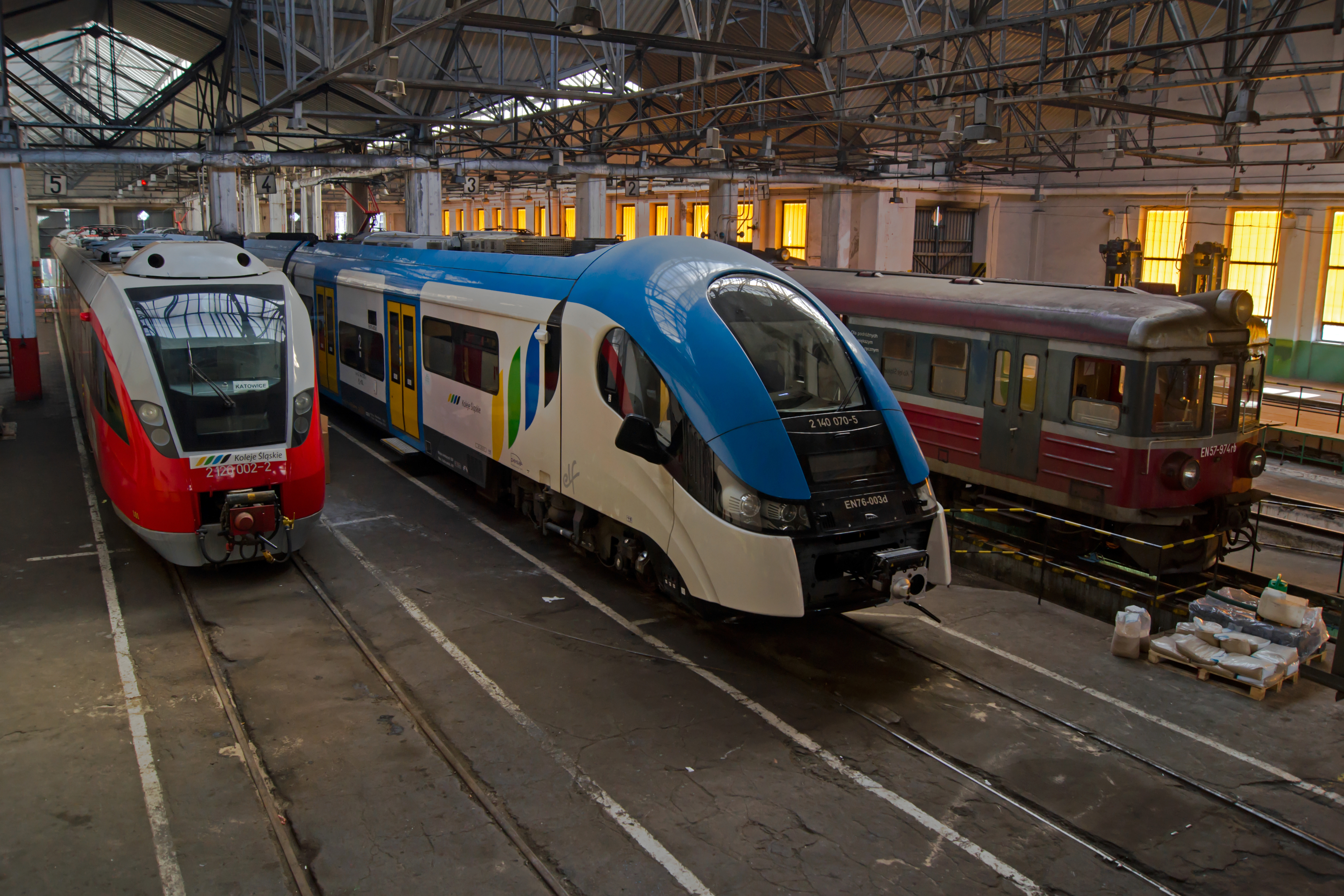
Silesian Railways trains at Łazy depot

In order to accelerate the electrification of this important communication route, works were carried out simultaneously on both sides of the line, from the side of Tczew and from the side of Nasielsk. There were two work fronts that met in the middle section of Działdowo - Iława. On October 7, 1985, the electric traction traffic introduced in 1982 on the Tłuszcz - Wyszków section was extended to Ostrołęka. 54 km. The next important communication route, the electrification of which was completed in 1986, is the Warsaw - Białystok - Kuźnica Białostocka line. The Warsaw - Tłuszcz section was electrified as early as 1952 as part of the electrification of the WWK. The Tłuszcz - Białystok - Kuźnica Białostocka route (199 km). The work included:

- Tłuszcz – Łochów 21 km 22.12.1981
- Łochów – Małkinia 30 km, September 20, 1982,

86,

On December 21, 1985, the electrification of the Wrocław - Legnica - Bolesławiec - Węgliniec route, 123 km long, was completed. Stages of this electrification:

- Wrocław Leśnica – Legnica – Miłkowice 61 km (on this line there was a risk of introducing a 25 kV 50 Hz power supply system. 23.XII.1984
- Miłkowice – Węgliniec 62 km on December 21, 1985.

On 30 May 1986, this line is completed with a second connection with an electric traction with Jelenia Góra via Lubań Śl. (section Węgliniec - Lubań Śl. - Jelenia Góra, 74 km long) and the section in the copper basin Legnica - Rudna Gwizdanów, 39 km long. On 28 May 1986, the electrification of the Kraków - Tarnów - Nowy Sącz - Krynica line reaches Marcinkowice near Nowy Sącz (the section Tarnów - Stróże - Nowy Sącz - Marcinkowice, 96 km long). The electrification to krynica was completed in 1987. The line was electrified in stages including:

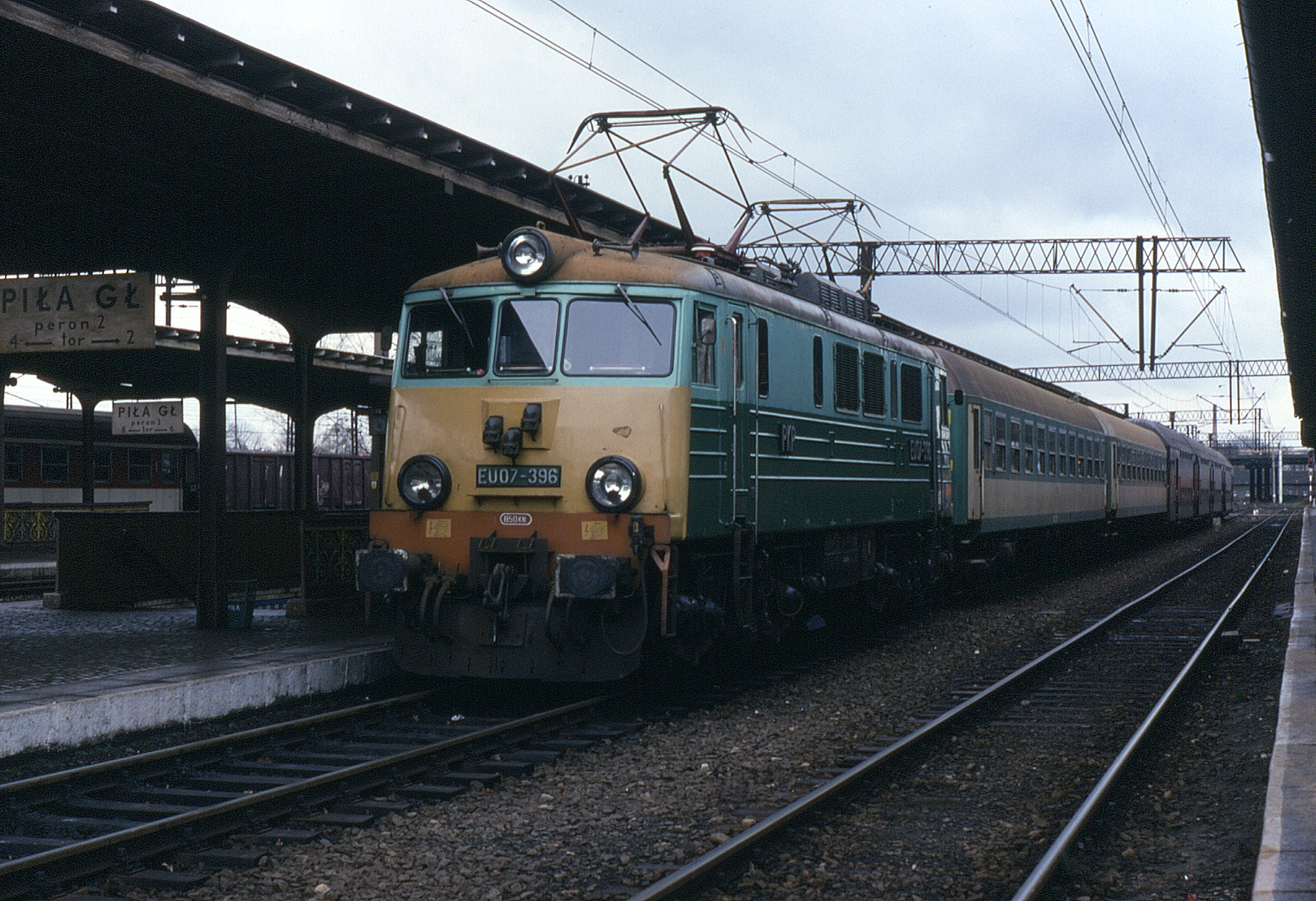
EU07-396 in Piła Główna in November 1994

- Tarnów – Tuchów 19 km, 30 November 1984
- Tuchów – Gromnik 10 km, 23 August 1985

On September 12, 1986, the northern bypass of WWK Warszawa Gdańska – Warszawa Czyste was included in the service of suburban trains. In 1987, the railway line from Jelenia Góra to Szklarska Poręba was electrified.

== Third Polish Republic ==
=== 1990s ===
Along with the political system changes, the electrification of Polish railways slowed down. On 5 December 1994 electrified railway line 220 Olsztyn Główny – Bogaczewo and railway line 204 on section Elbląg – Bogaczewo. It was the last largest investment in the electrification of Polish railways in the 20th century. In 1995 located on the Polish–Ukrainian border the broad-gauge railway line 92 Przemyśl Główny – Medyka was electrified on voltage 3000 V DC, which facilitated access to Przemyśl for international passenger trains and eliminating the handling of international trains by Polish SM48 diesel locomotives in double traction.

7 April 1995 in Warsaw opened Warsaw Metro line M1 at station Politechnika about power 750 V DC on third rail.

=== Since 2000s ===
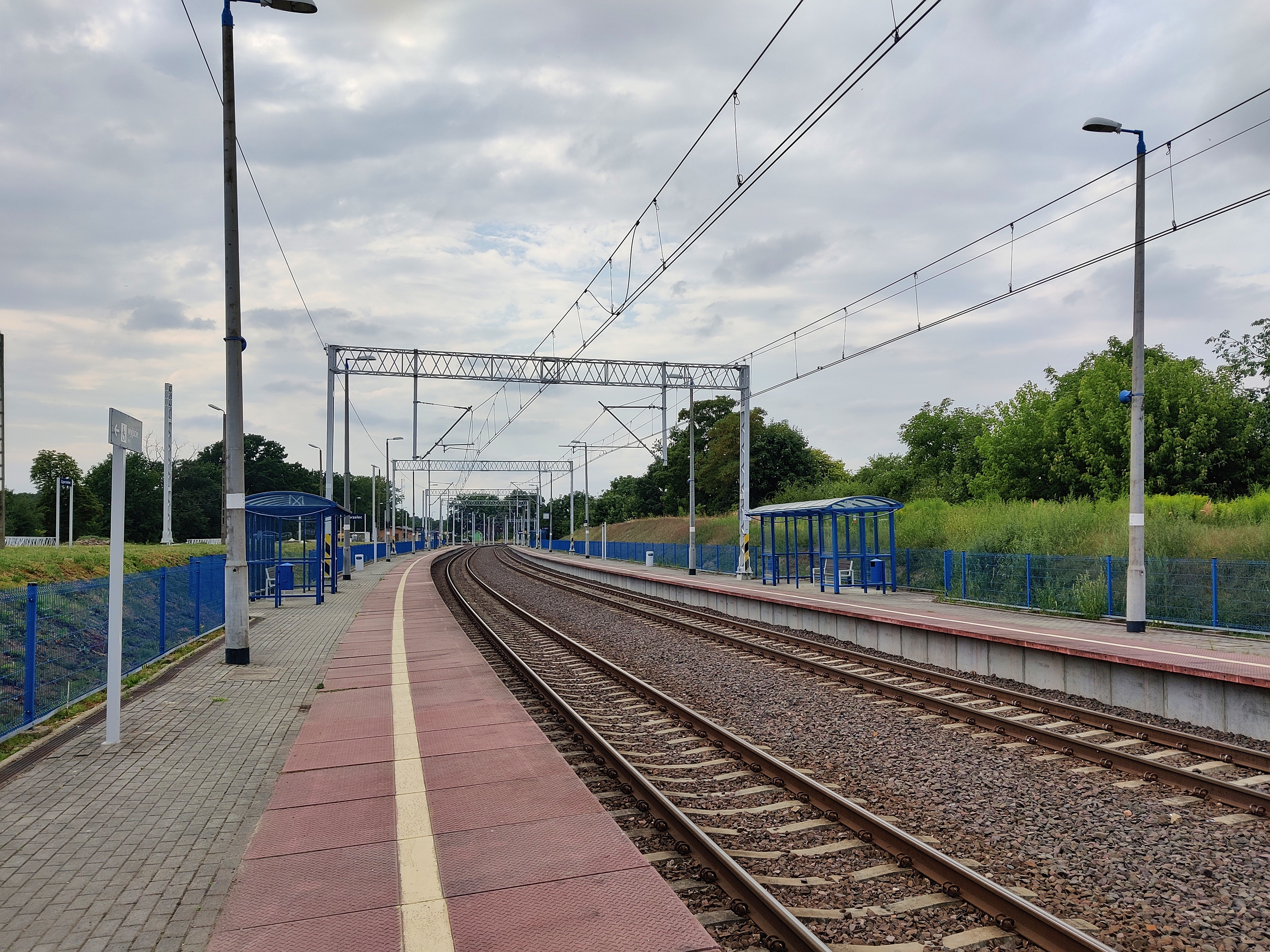
Zgorzelec railway station in July 2022

In the 2000s, PKP carried out minor electrification of border lines with Germany, the Czech Republic and Slovakia.

In February 2014, work began on the modernization and electrification of the railway line 118 Kraków Główny – Kraków Lotnisko to Balice. The works were completed the following year, and the ceremonial opening of the line took place on September 25, 2015.

On May 28, 2016, the power supply to Warsaw Commuter Railway was changed from 600 V to 3000 V DC. Which ultimately resulted in the resignation from using 600 V power on the Polish railways.

In 2017, the modernization and completion of the unfinished electrification of the line 68 from Lublin Zemborzyce to Stalowa Wola Rozwadów, where the traction network was put into service on December 13, 2020, began.

In 2018–2019, the Węgliniec – Zgorzelec line 278, which is the E 30 line of the international pan-European transport corridors, was electrified. The traction network on the line was launched on December 15, 2019.

In September 2019, work began on the electrification of the Ocice – Rzeszów railway line 71, which ended on December 12, 2021, which made it possible to shorten connections to Rzeszów from Warsaw.

In addition, from 15 June 2021 to 2023 the electrification of the Pomeranian Metropolitan Railway, which was opened in 2015, was carried out. On June 12, 2023, the traction network was launched on the section belonging to PKM.

On 10 December 2023 the electrification and modernization of the railway line 182 Tarnowskie Góry – Zawiercie together with two neighboring connectors, which are railway lines 705 and 892, were completed, thanks to which passenger connections to Katowice Airport in Pyrzowice were launched.

In July 2020, a tender was announced for the modernization and electrification of the Ełk – Giżycko section of railway line 38 as part of the first stage related to works on the Ełk – Korsze section. Eleven offers were submitted to the tender, from which, a year later, Torpol's offer worth 681.3 million Polish Złoty was selected as the most advantageous one to carry out the works; however, the offer was soon invalidated, and the Spanish-Chinese consortium of Aldesa Construcciones Polska, Aldesa Construcciones, Coalvi and China Civil Engineering Construction Corporation was selected to carry out the work, with which the contract was signed on December 7, 2021, which also resulted in a delay in the date of the originally planned start of works. The works started on March 13, 2022, which resulted in the introduction of replacement bus transport on this section and the redirection of long-distance trains to other routes. In January 2023, the European Commission awarded a subsidy of 145 million Euro from the Cohesion Fund to finance works on the Ełk – Giżycko section. On May 4, 2022, a tender was announced for the modernization and electrification of the Giżycko – Korsze section, the contract for which was concluded on October 2, 2023, with Torpol. The investment cost is 876 million Polish złoty. The Ełk – Giżycko section under the overhead line was put into operation on 3 September 2025, while the Giżycko – Korsze section was put into operation on 1 April 2026, thus completing the electrification of the entire Ełk – Korsze section.

== Unrealized plans for alternating current electrification ==
During the implementation of electrification, many technical and economic problems related to electrification with 3000 V DC appeared, which resulted in a discussion on the selection of a new power supply system for electric traction. Already in 1956, a discussion was started on the accuracy of electrification of railway lines with a voltage of 25 kV AC. In July 1957, at the request of the Ministry of Communication, the Railway Electrification Design Office carried out a study analyzing the possibilities and desirability of using single-phase alternating current electric traction with an industrial frequency of 50 Hz on PKP.

In April 1959, an inter-ministerial working team was established. Thanks to the efforts of this team, a number of studies and design studies have been carried out. The electrification projects for several lines were carried out at that time in two variants: for 3 kV direct current and 25 kV 50 Hz alternating current. a reasonable compromise, the Wrocław – Legnica line (50 km long) was selected for electrification with 50 Hz alternating current, for which a preliminary project of electrification with this system was developed. The Ministry of Communications placed an order for the supply of 70 50 Hz AC electric locomotives for this line, but the rolling stock industry did not even start to build a prototype of these locomotives, considering that it could not risk starting new production for such a small series of locomotives. In 1959, PKP also tried to convince the Ministry of Communications to electrify the Coal Main to 25 kV 50 Hz alternating current, but the idea was also rejected.

In October 1960, BPEK developed a study entitled "Selection of a test section on PKP for electrification with 50 Hz alternating current", and in March 1961, a study was prepared to compare the costs of electrification of the Kraków – Przemyśl – Medyka railway line with 3 kV direct current and 25 kV alternating current In May this year, a comparative study was also prepared on the electrification of the Poznań – Szczecin line with 3 kV direct current and 25 kV 50 Hz alternating current. The discussion on the introduction of 25 kV AC power supply lasted eight years and was completed in 1965 by the Ministry of Transport, which decided to continue the 3 kV DC electrification. The rejection of electrification plans for 25 kV 50 Hz was related to the fact that the introduction of a new type of power supply could seriously weigh on the pace of electrification and would require many points of contact with the exchange of a large number of trains. It was required to build tangential stations with individual switching of the power supply system and changing the locomotives of each train would be very expensive, and due to the need to expand the station, in some conditions impossible. Although, despite these conditions, there would be savings on power equipment, the total expenditure on electrification and associated works for the new system would be greater than the corresponding expenditure related to electrification with the DC system, which was the reason for the termination of all work on the development of 25 kV 50 Hz power supply.

The topic of 25 kV AC electrification was revisited in the 1980s, but then most of the railway lines had already been electrified, and this topic did not play a significant role in the development of the future of electrification development.

Another plan to introduce the 25 kV AC system on the Polish railways was the project high speed line Y from the turn of 2000s and 2010s, but the project has not been implemented to this day.

== Current projects ==
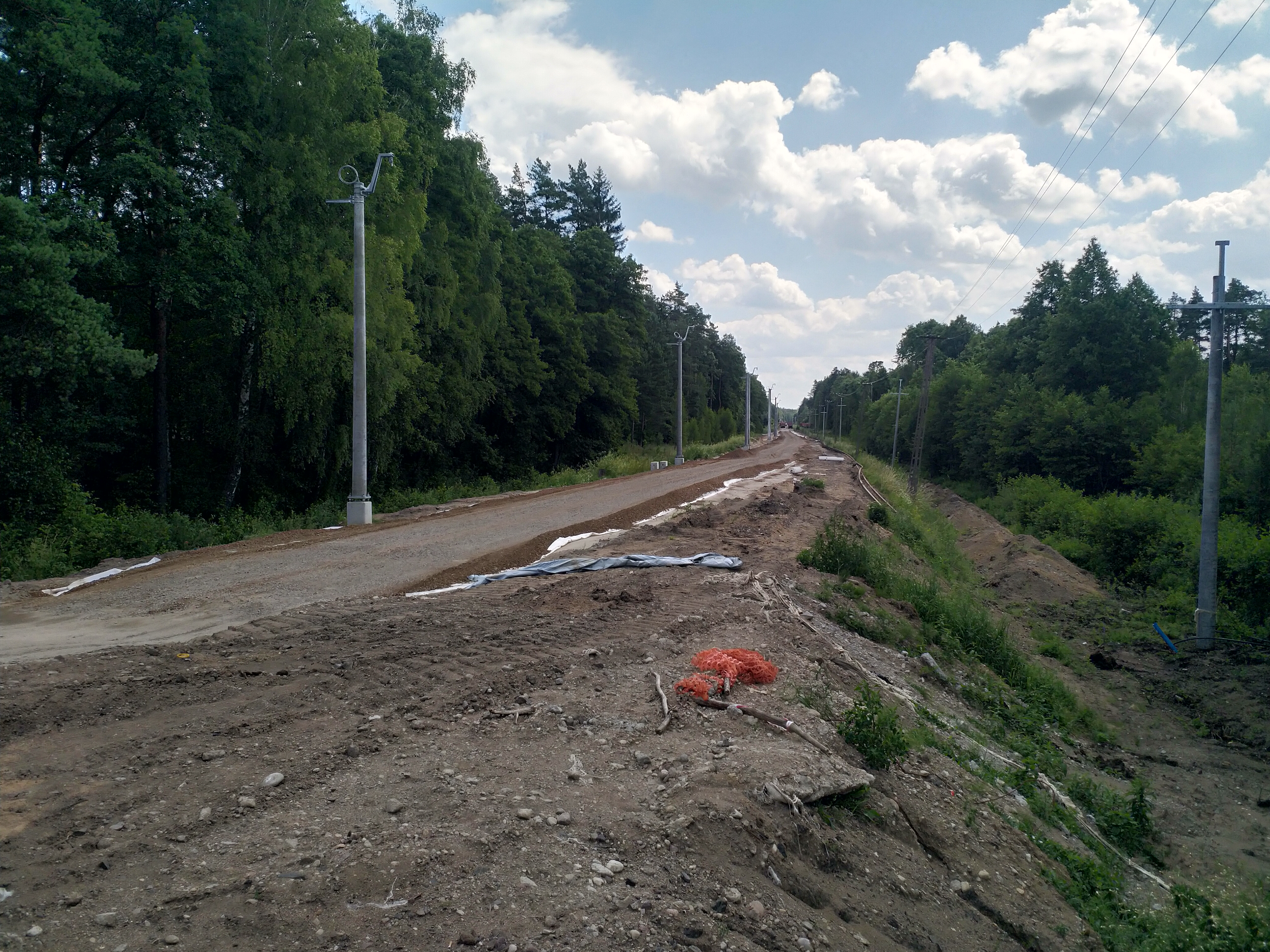
Length Ełk – Giżycko railway line 38 during electrification and modernization in July 2023.

=== Rabka-Zdrój – Fornale and Tymbark – Marcinkowice ===
On February 10, 2022, PKP PLK announced a tender for the modernization and electrification of the railway line 104 Chabówka – Nowy Sącz on the sections Chabówka – Rabka Zaryte and siding Klęczany – Nowy Sącz of construction for the electrificted line Podłęże – Piekiełko so called hellish line (pl: Piekielna linia). The works planned are to be completed until 2027 On April 5, 2023, a tender was announced to extend the works by a section Rabka Zaryte – Mszana Dolna and Limanowa – siding Klęczany. In September 2023, work began on the Klęczany – Marcinkowice section. On October 3, 2023, a contract was signed with Strabag for the modernization and electrification of the Rabka Zaryte – Mszana Dolna section. and on March 8, 2024, an agreement was signed with the Polish-Turkish consortium Budimex S.A./Gülermak Ağir Sanayi Inşaat ve Taahhüt A.Ş./Gülermak Sp. z o.o. for the implementation of the works. In June 2024 work began on the Limanowa – Klęczany section, consisting of the construction of a mostly new section along with the construction of a tunnel in Pisarzowa and electrification of the route.

=== Kępno – Oleśnica ===
2 January 2023 a tender was announced for the electrification of the Kępno – Oleśnica section of line 181 and on March 8, 2024, a contract for the implementation of works was signed. Work began in the summer of 2024 and is scheduled to last until 2026.

=== Maksymilianowo – Gdynia Główna and Glincz – Kartuzy – Somonino ===
In 1993, electrification of railway line 201 on the Kościerzyna – Gdynia Główna section was planned, but this was not implemented.

On September 25, 2017, PKP PLK signed an agreement with Egis Poland to develop design documentation for the construction of a second track between Gdańsk Osowa and Kościerzyna and the electrification of the Kościerzyna – Gdynia section. On November 9, 2018, PKP PLK signed an agreement with MGGP to prepare design documentation for the reconstruction and electrification of the line on the Maksymilianowo – Kościerzyna section.

On July 13, 2022, a tender was announced for the modernization and electrification of railway line No. 201 on the Kościerzyna – Somonino section and line No. 214 in the design and build form.

On September 20, 2024, a contract was signed for the electrification and construction of a second track on railway line No. 201 on the Somonino – Gdańsk Osowa section, and railway line No. 229 on the Glincz – Kartuzy section. The implementation of works on the Maksymilianowo – Gdynia Główna and Glincz – Kartuzy – Somonino sections is planned for 2024–2030.

== Future projects ==
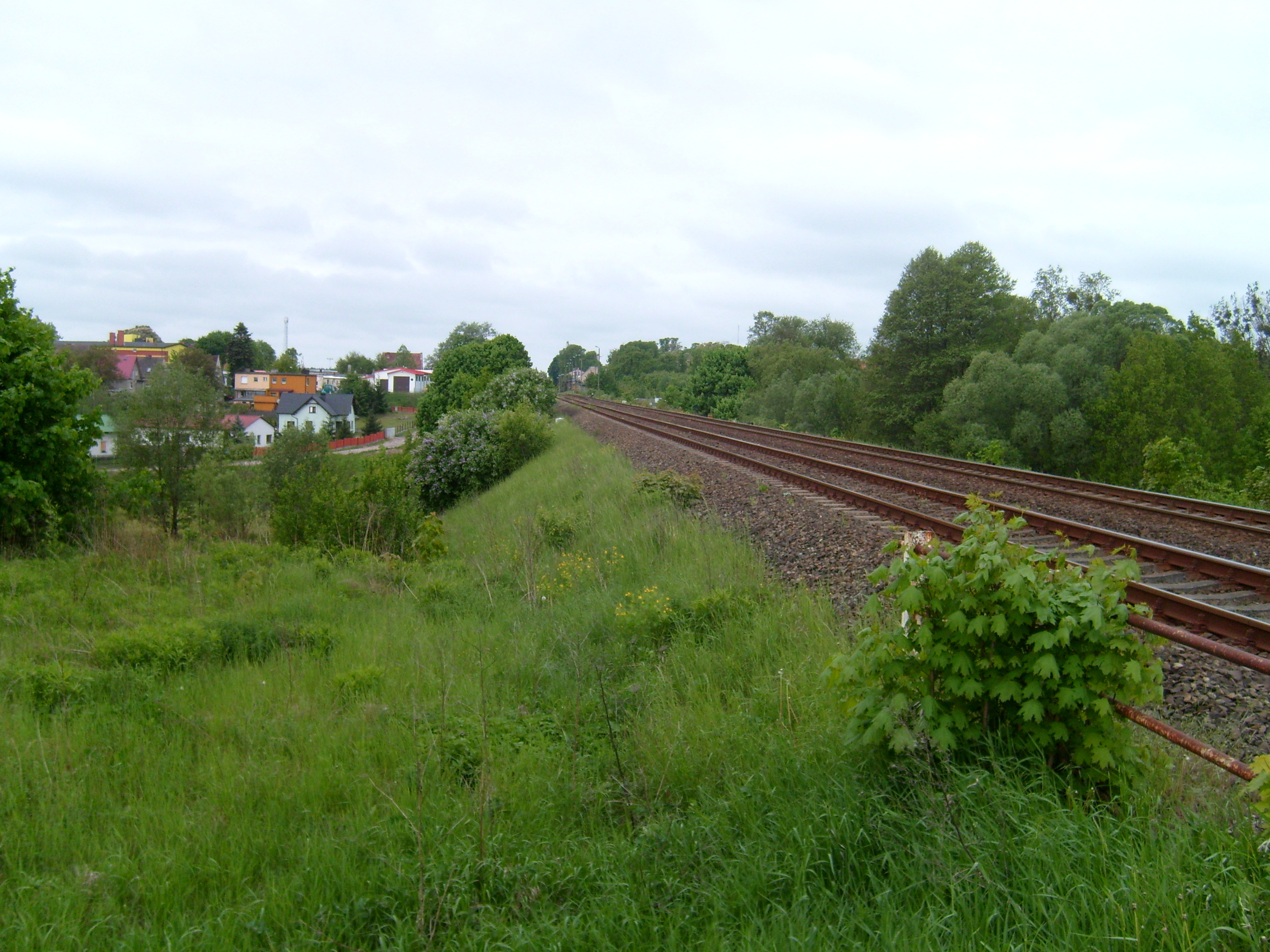
The railway line 203 Tczew – Kostrzyn constituting a part of the Prussian Eastern Railway was planned for electrification in the 1970s and 1980s. Neither of these plans were implemented. Currently, PKP plans to electrify the line in the coming years.

On August 16, 2023, a resolution was adopted at the meeting of the Council of Ministers on the establishment of the National Railway Program (pl: Krajowy Program Kolejowy), assuming the electrification of over 1,400 km of railway lines by the end of 2030. DSDiK also plans to electrify the railway line 326 Wrocław Psie Pole – Trzebnica along with the construction of an additional passing loop, but currently no tender for the work has been announced.

The plans of PKP for the years 2021–2030 with the perspective until 2040 include electrification of the following lines:

1. Line 14 on length Podg. Durzyn (Krotoszyn) – Leszno – Głogów.

2. Line 25 on length Tomaszów Mazowiecki – Skarżysko Kamienna.

3. Line 27 Nasielsk – Sierpc – Lipno – Toruń Wschodni.

4. Line 30 Łuków – Lublin Północny.

5. Line 31 Siedlce – Siemianówka.

6. Line 34 Małkinia – Ostrów Mazowiecka – Ostrołęka.

7. Line 106 Rzeszów Główny – Jasło.

8. Line 107 Nowy Zagórz – Łupków.

9. Line 108 on length Jasło – Nowy Zagórz – Krościenko.

10. Line 115 Tarnów – Szczucin koło Tarnowa.

11. Line 137 on length Kędzierzyn Koźle – Legnica.

12. Line 203 Tczew – Kostrzyn divided into stages: Piła – Kostrzyn and Tczew – Piła.

13. Line 208 Działdowo – Chojnice on the part: Jabłonowo Pomorskie – Brodnica, Laskowice Pomorskie – Grudziądz and Wierzchucin – Tuchola.

14. Line 215 on length Laskowice Pomorskie – Bąk.

15. Line 274 on length Lubań Śląski – Zgorzelec.

16. Line 287 Opole Zachodnie – Nysa.

=== Piotrków Trybunalski – Zarzecze ===
As part of the government's Kolej + program, it is planned to electrify line 24 with the restoration of passenger traffic from Piotrków Trybunalski to Bełchatów. On 16 December 2022 PKP PLK signed with Marshal's Office of the Łódź Voivodeship contract for the performance of works modernization and electrification on line 24 worth 662 mln zł. On 27 December this year a tender was announced for the execution of design works. On July 24, 2023, an agreement was concluded with TPF for the implementation of design works.

=== Łuków – Lublin Północny ===
On November 8, 2022, PKP PLK signed an agreement with the Lublin Voivodeship for the electrification of the railway line 30 (Lublin Północny – Łuków) and the modernization and electrification of railway lines 69 and 72 on the Rejowiec – Zawada – Zamość Szopinek route as part of the Kolej + program. On May 8, 2023, a tender was announced for the development of design documentation along with author's supervision for the electrification of railway line 30.

On October 6, 2023, PKP PLK concluded an agreement with Multiconsult Sp. z o. o. for the preparation of design documentation for the electrification of railway line 30 Łuków – Lublin Północny. According to the assumptions, work on the documentation is to be completed by 2026, and work on electrification would last in the years 2026–2029.

=== Ostrów Mazowiecka – Małkinia and Sokołów Podlaski – Siedlce ===
17 October 2022 PKP has signed an agreement with the local government of the Mazowieckie Voivodeship for the modernization and electrification of the railway line 34 from Małkinia to Ostrów Mazowiecka and the railway line 55 from Siedlce to Sokołów Podlaski. These works are aimed at restoring passenger connections that both cities lost in 1993. On 10 October 2023 an agreement was signed for the modernization and electrification of railway line 55 on the Sokołów Podlaski – Siedlce section.

=== Bojanów – Góra ===
The self-government of the Lower Silesian Voivodship also postulates the electrification of the railway line 372 from Bojanów to Góra, where passenger traffic is planned to be restored.

== Specification ==
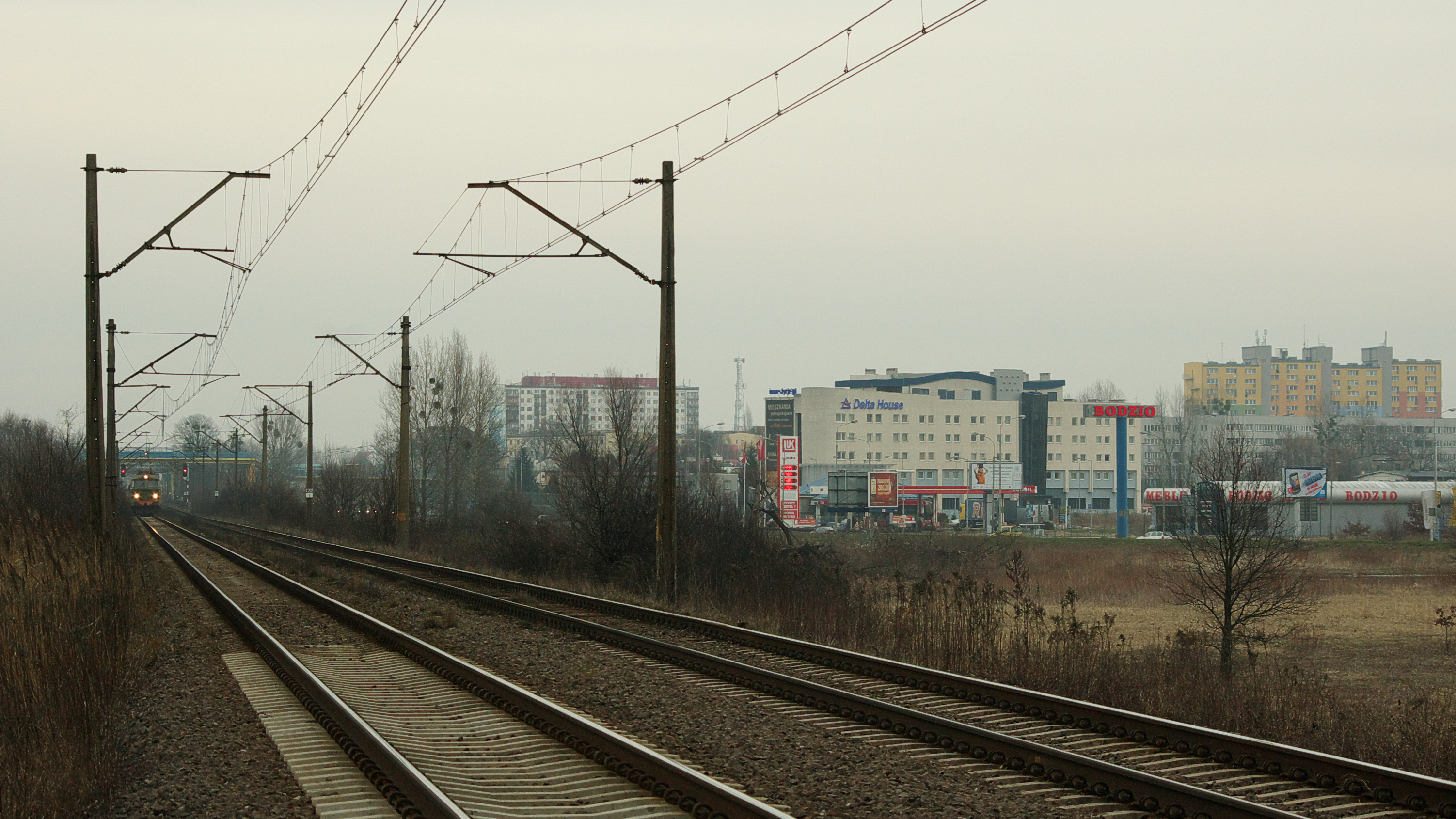
Overhead catenary poles with T-bar booms in railway line 143. Booms of this type were installed during the electrification of railway lines until the early 1980s when they were replaced by tubular booms.

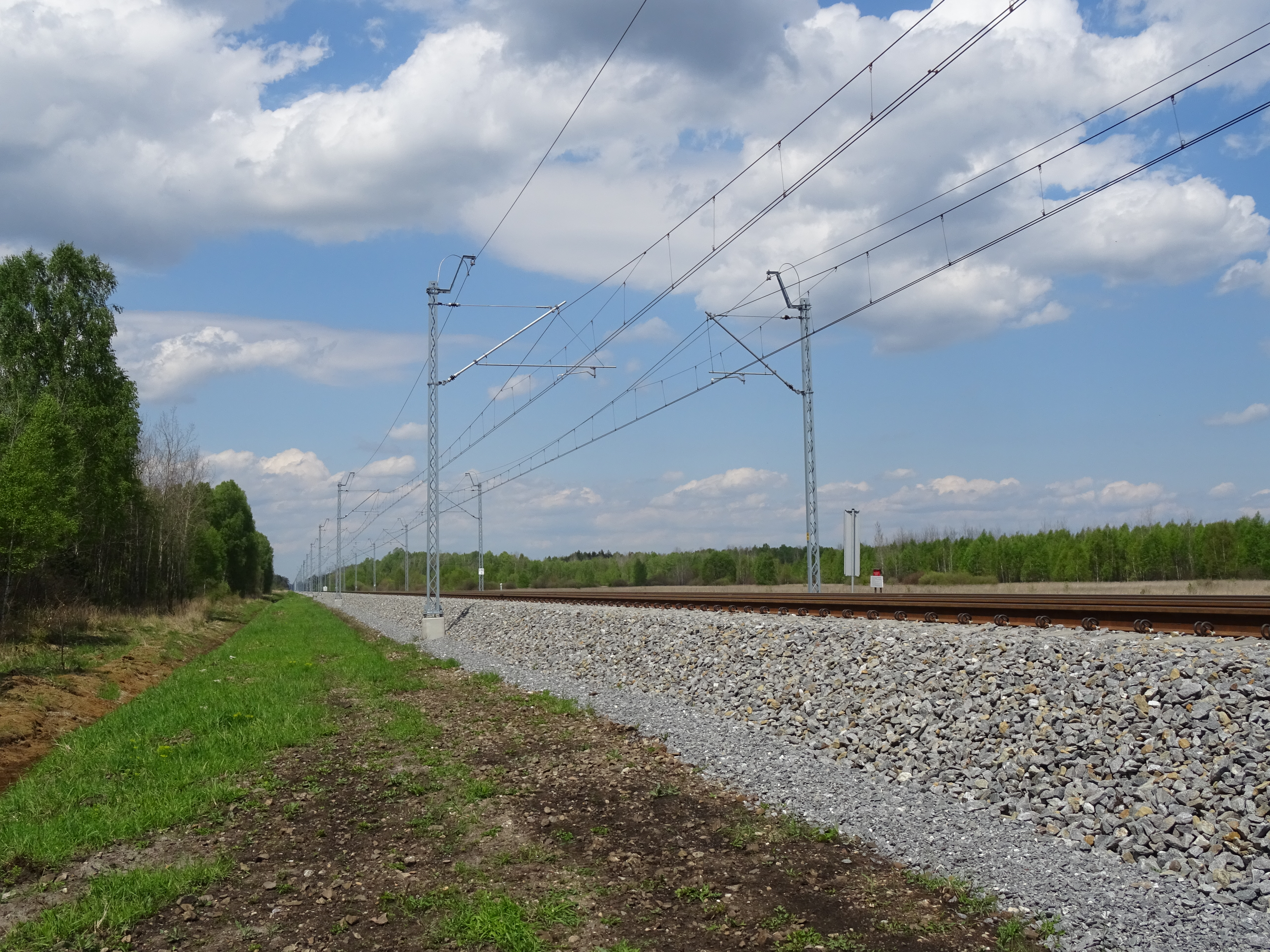
Modern electric traction network on the railway line 1. The poles are bolted to piles driven into the ground.

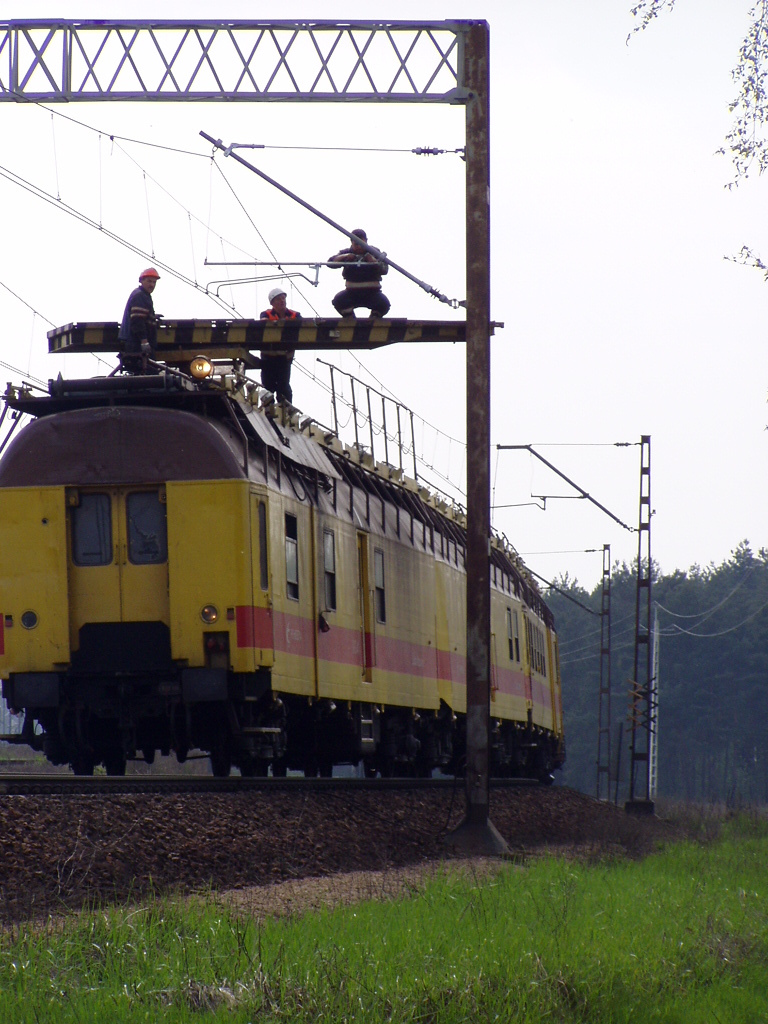
Network train with workers at work.

Used or planned line systems

mains voltage	Name of system	Note
3000 V DC	Polish State Railways	Standard voltage used on all railroads in country.
3000 V DC	Warsaw Commuter Railway	Standard voltage used on all railroads in country.
3000 V DC	SKM Trójmiasto	Standard voltage used on all railroads in country.
3000 V DC	Pomorska Kolej Metropolitalna	Standard voltage used on all railroads in country.
3000 V DC	Dolnośląska Służba Dróg i Kolei we Wrocławiu	Planned of electrification several railway lines.
2400 V DC	KWB Konin	
250 V DC	KWB Konin	On this voltage, the side network functions under the loaders.
48 V DC	KWB Konin	On this voltage, the side network functions under the loaders.
750 V DC	Warsaw Metro	Powered from third rail
25000 V AC	Broad Gauge Metallurgy Line	The electrification of a four-kilometer section from the transshipment terminal to the border in Hrubieszów is planned in connection with the electrification of the Kowel – Izow line by the UZ. The electrification of the entire LHS line to 25 kV AC is taken into account.
25000 V AC	Polish State Railways	The electrification of 25 kV planned for the construction of high-speed lines under the New Central Polish Airport is also taken into account.

Former line systems

mains voltage	Name of system	Note
400 V DC	Wąbrzeźno city / Polish State Railways	This type of traction was only used on Line 264 which was dismantled in 1959.
600 V DC	Warsaw Commuter Railway	Until 27 May 2016. Currently, this voltage is used by tram lines.
650 V DC	Warsaw Commuter Railway	It was used at the beginning of EKD's operations.
800 V DC	SKM Trójmiasto	Used in the Tri-City agglomeration from 1951 to 19 December 1976.
1000 V DC	Polish State Railways	Used by the Polish State Railways on the Walimska Railway from 1946 to 1959.
15000 V AC	Polish State Railways	It was in possession in 1945 in south Lower Silesia. Soon after, it was dismantled by the Red Army as a spoil of war.

Length of electrified lines
Year	Length	% network
1938	106 km	0,5
1950	156 km	0,7
1955	477 km	2,1
1960	1026 km	3,8
1965	2227 km	8,3
1970	3872 km	16,7
1975	5588 km	23,5
1980	6868 km	28,1
1981	7091 km	29,1

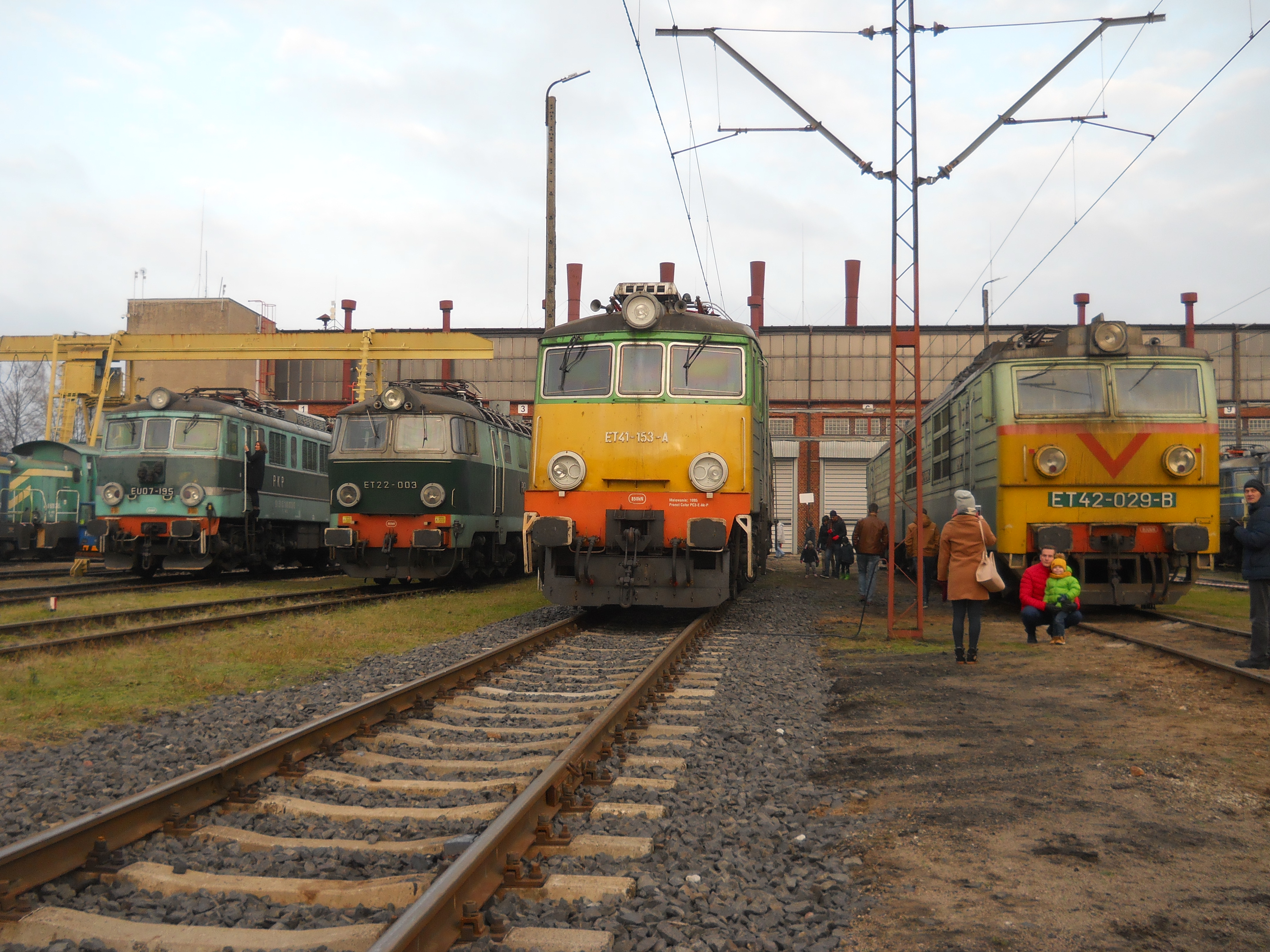
PKP Cargo electric locomotives at the Kobylepole depot. November 2019

Mean rate of electrification of railway lines in the years 1946–1995
Years	percent of a kilometer	length electrificted railways on kilometer
1946–1950	30,4	152
1951–1955	66,6	333
1956–1960	108,2	541
1961–1965	240,2	1 201
1966–1970	329,0	1 645
1971–1975	343,2	1 716
1976–1980	256,0	1 280
1981–1985	406,8	2 034
1986–1990	497,0	2 485
1991–1995	74,4	372

Number of operated standard-gauge electrified railway lines in km in 1950–2009, 2015 and 2020–2023
Year	Total	Electrificted		Non-electrficted	
Year	Total	Number	participation	Number	participation
1950	22 500	200	0,9%	22 300	99,1%
1960	23 200	1 000	4,3%	22 200	95,7%
1970	23 300	3 900	16,7%	19 400	83,3%
1980	24 400	6 900	28,3%	17 500	71,7%
1990	24 000	11 400	47,5%	12 600	52,5%
1993	23 300	11 500	49,4%	11 800	50,6%
1994	22 900	11 600	50,7%	11 300	49,3%
1995	22 600	11 600	51,3%	11 000	48,7%
1996	22 300	11 600	52,0%	10 700	48,0%
1997	22 300	11 600	52,0%	10 700	48,0%
1998	22 100	11 600	52,5%	10 500	47,5%
1999	21 900	12 000	54,8%	9 900	45,2%
2000	21 600	11 900	55,1%	9 700	44,9%
2001	20 100	12 000	59,7%	8 100	40,3%
2002	20 700	12 200	58,9%	8 500	41,1%
2003	20 300	12 200	60,1%	8 100	39,9%
2004	19 900	12 000	60,3%	7 900	39,7%
changing the counting method
2005	19 800	11 900	60,1%	7 900	39,9%
2006	19 800	11 900	60,1%	7 900	39,9%
2007	19 800	11 900	60,1%	7 900	39,9%
2008	20 000	11 900	59,5%	8 100	40,5%
2009	20 200	12 000	59,4%	8 200	40,6%
2015	19 330	11 795	63,7%	no data	no data
2020	19 461	12 048	61,9%	7 548	38,1%
2021	19 326	12 156	62,9%	7 170	37,1%
2022	19 393	12 126	62,5%	7 267	37,4%
2023	19 576	12 236	62,5%	7 340	37,4%
