= Pan-European Corridor II =

Garmany-Russia road and rail investment priority area

- Pan-European Corridor II highlighted in red

Major junctions
- Start end: Berlin (Germany)
- End end: Nizhny Novgorod (Russia)

Location
- Countries: Germany, Poland, Belarus and Russia

Highway system
- Pan-European corridors

The Corridor II is one of the Pan-European corridors. It runs between Berlin in Germany, and Nizhny Novgorod in Russia, passing through Poland and Belarus. The corridor follows the route: Berlin - Poznań - Warsaw - Brest - Minsk - Smolensk - Moscow - Nizhny Novgorod. The road corridor is concurrent with E30 from Berlin to Moscow.

Due to the Schengen Agreement, the border between Germany and Poland can be crossed easily without any passport or immigrations checks. There is border control when crossing the border from the European Union (Poland) into Belarus near Brest, and citizens of most countries need a visa to enter one country or the other, or both. On the Belarus–Russia border, however, there are no immigration checks, because Russia and Belarus are part of the same Union State.

Rail traffic along this route is hindered by a break of gauge at the border between Poland and Belarus. Poland (along with the rest of Western and Central Europe) uses standard-gauge, while Belarus, Russia, and the former Soviet Union use Russian gauge. The route from Brest to Moscow is also part of Euro-Asian Rail Route 2.

== The Road Corridor ==
2,262 km comprising:

- Germany

118 km from Berlin made up of 24 km of the Berlin Ring Road A10 to the "Spreeau" Junction and the Freedom Autobahn A12 (E30) to the Polish border at Frankfurt an der Oder

- Poland

672 km comprising National Road DK2 (E30) via Poznan and Warsaw to the Belarus border at Terespol including 465 km of the Motorway of Freedom (Autostrada Wolności) A2 Autostrada and S2 Expressway southern bypass in Warsaw for 34 km.

- Belarus

604 km comprising M1 (E30) from Brest via Minsk to the Russian border at Krasnoye.

- Russia

860 km including M1 (E30) the Belarus Highway 440 km via Smolensk to Moscow and M7 (E22) the Volga Highway to Nizhny Novgorod.

== The Rail Corridor ==
2,313 km comprising

- Germany

the double track electrified KBS 201 (E20) from Berlin 85 km to Frankfurt an der Oder.

- Poland

Railway line E20 consists of the PLK 3 from Germany 473 km electrified mostly double track via Kunowice and Poznań to Warsaw and PLK 2 211 km electrified double track from Warsaw via Siedlce to Terespol and the border, with a single rail non-electrified broad gauge line 446 joining at Terespol.

- Belarus

610 km double track electrified from Poland as the Brest branch and Baranavichy (Baranovichi) branch via Minsk and the Minsk branch to Russia at Vorša Belarusian_Railway.

- Russia

489 km via Smolensk to Moscow as part of the Moscow Railway and 439 km from Moscow to Nizhny Novgorod as part of the Gorky Railway.
