= Mińsk Mazowiecki railway station =

Railway station in Mińsk Mazowiecki, Poland

Mińsk Mazowiecki
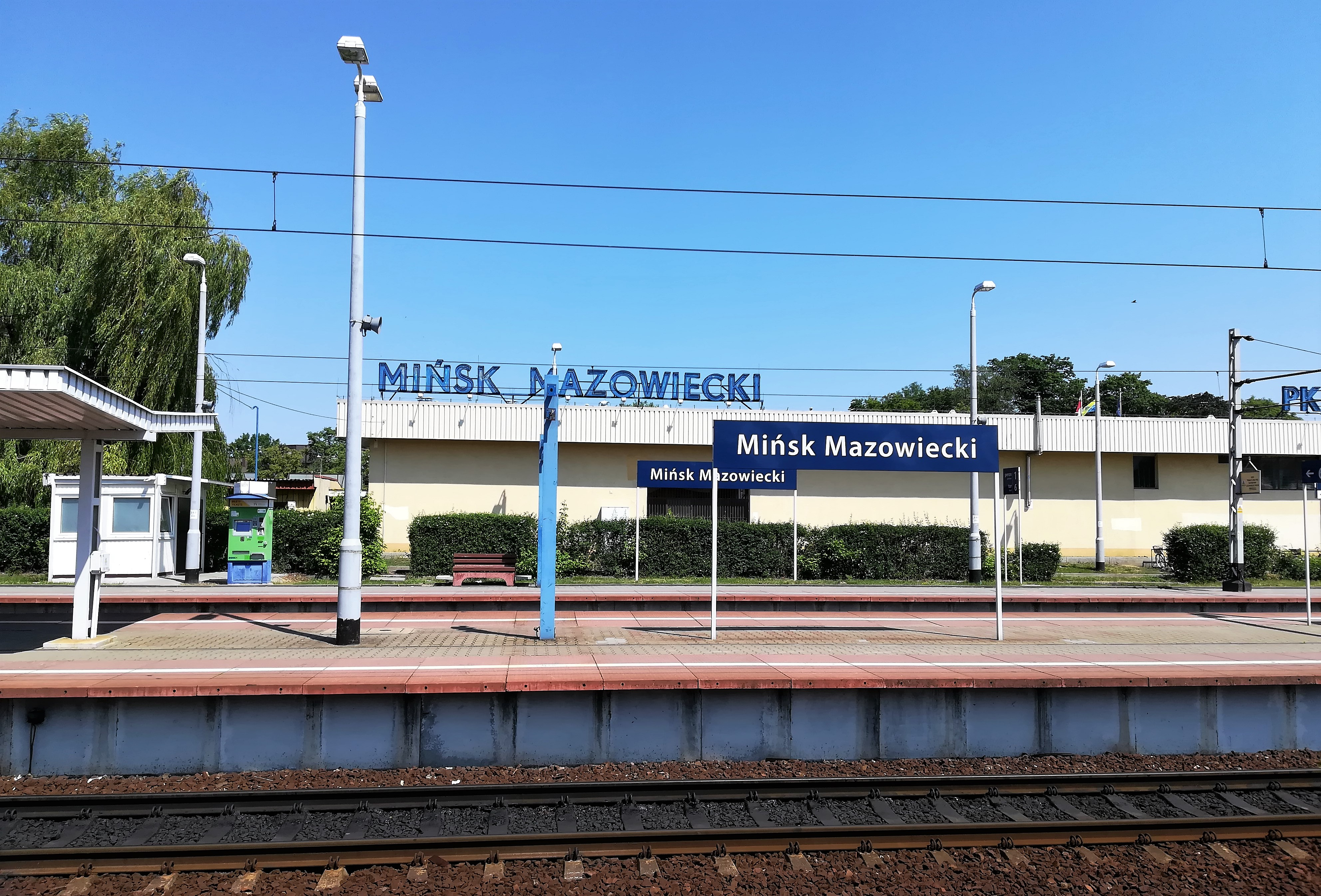

General information
- Location: Mińsk Mazowiecki, Masovian; Poland
- Coordinates: 52°10′32″N 21°33′15″E
- System: B
- Owner: Polskie Koleje Państwowe S.A.
- Platforms: 4
- Tracks: 7

Construction
- Structure type: Building: Yes

History
- Opened: 1866

Services
Preceding station	PKP Intercity	Following station
Warszawa Wschodnia towards Warszawa Zachodnia	Kyiv-Express	Siedlce towards Kyiv-Pasazhyrskyi
Preceding station	Masovian Railways	Following station
Wrzosów towards Warszawa Zachodnia	R2	Mińsk Mazowiecki Anielina towards Łuków
Location
- Location within Masovian Voivodeship Location within Poland Location within Europe

Mińsk Mazowiecki railway station is a railway station serving Mińsk Mazowiecki in Masovian Voivodeship, Poland. It is served by Masovian Railways (who run services from Warszawa Zachodnia to Łuków) Polregio and PKP Intercity (TLK services). Some international trains also serve the station.

The station was opened on 9 October 1866. The current building was opened in 1979. In 2006–2007, the station was refurbished further with the addition of an accessible underpass to all platforms. Mińsk Mazowiecki is classified as B importance in the categories of Polish rail stations.

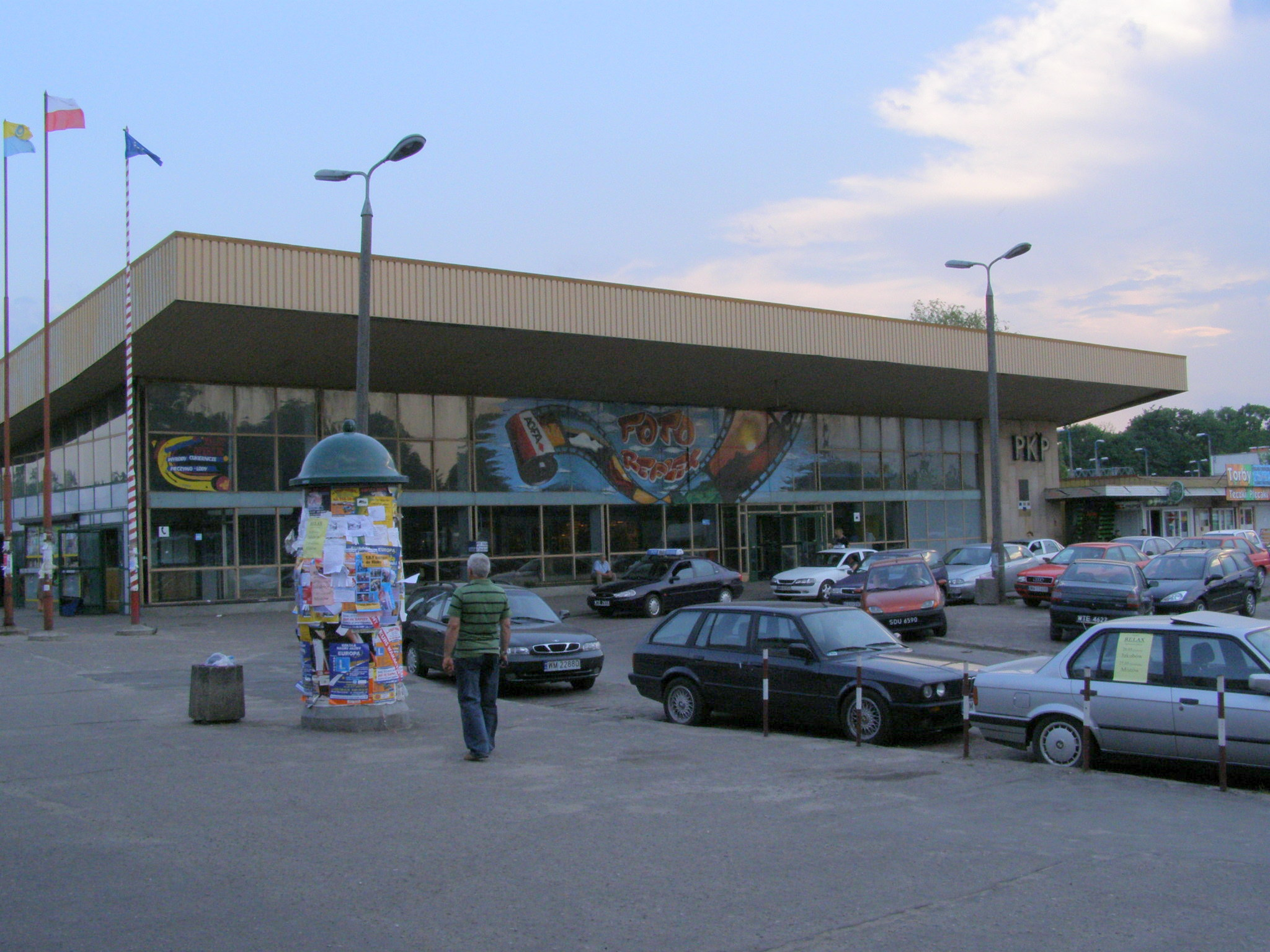

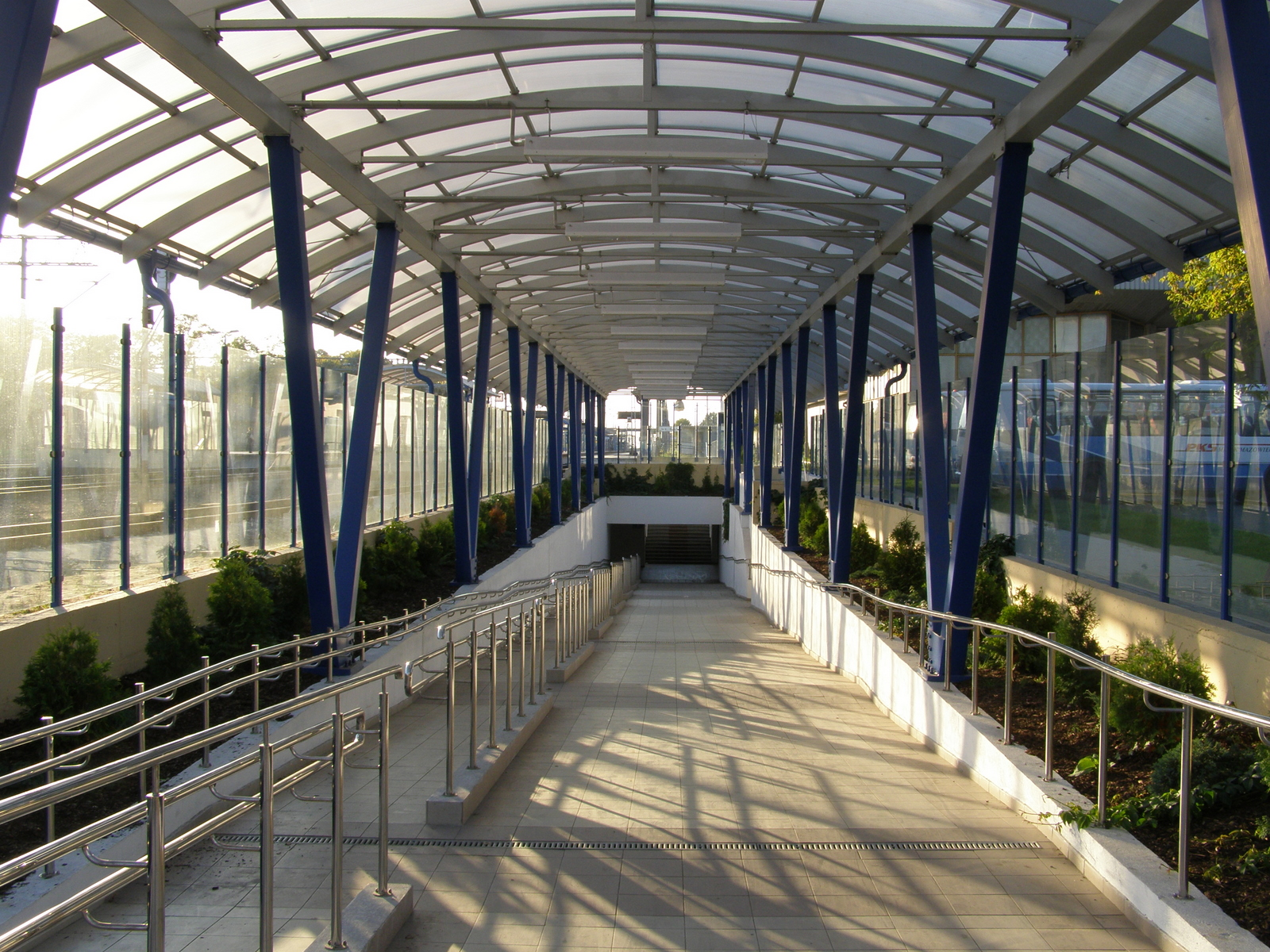

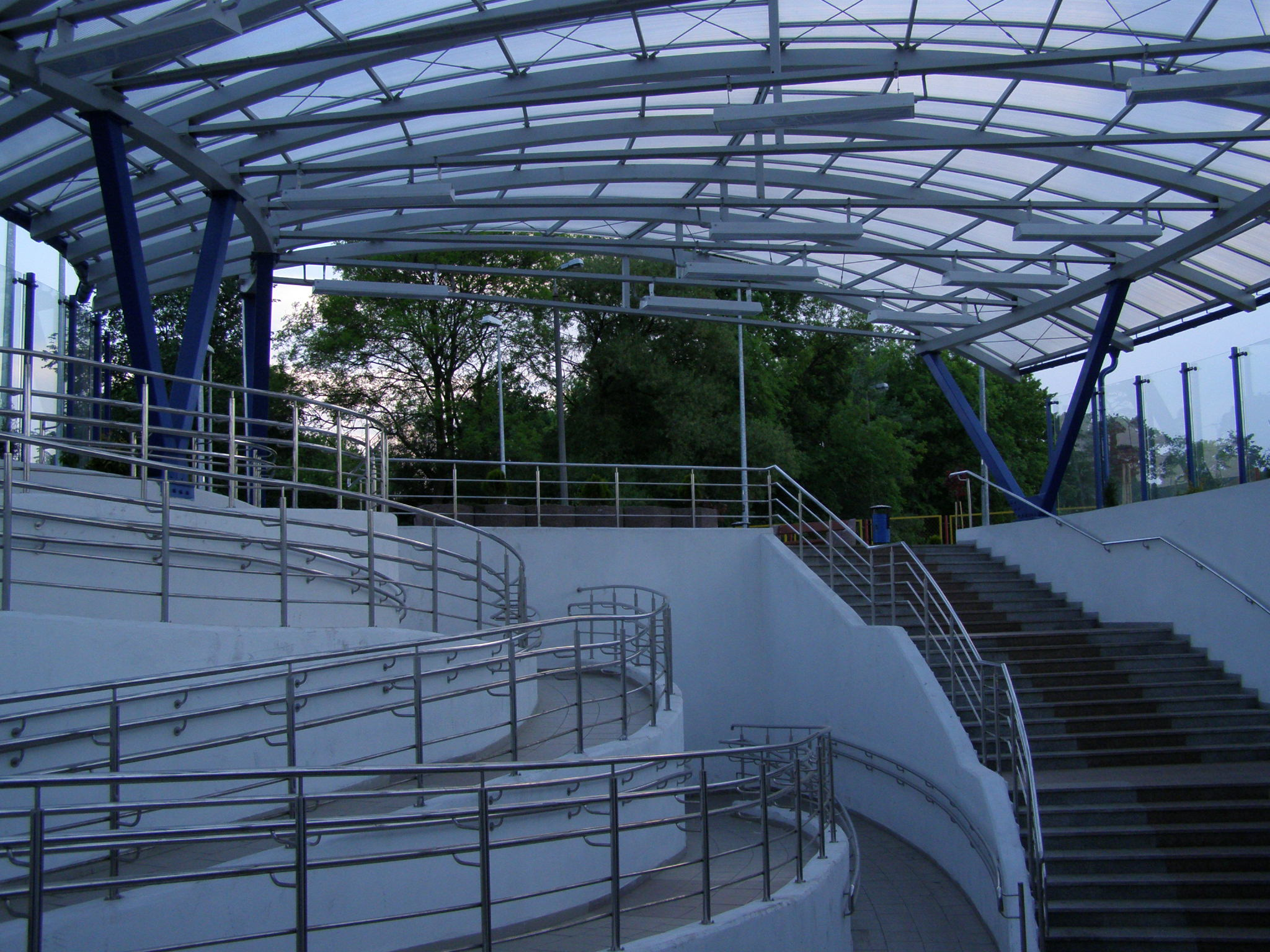
