= Siedlce railway station =

Railway station in Siedlce, Poland

Siedlce
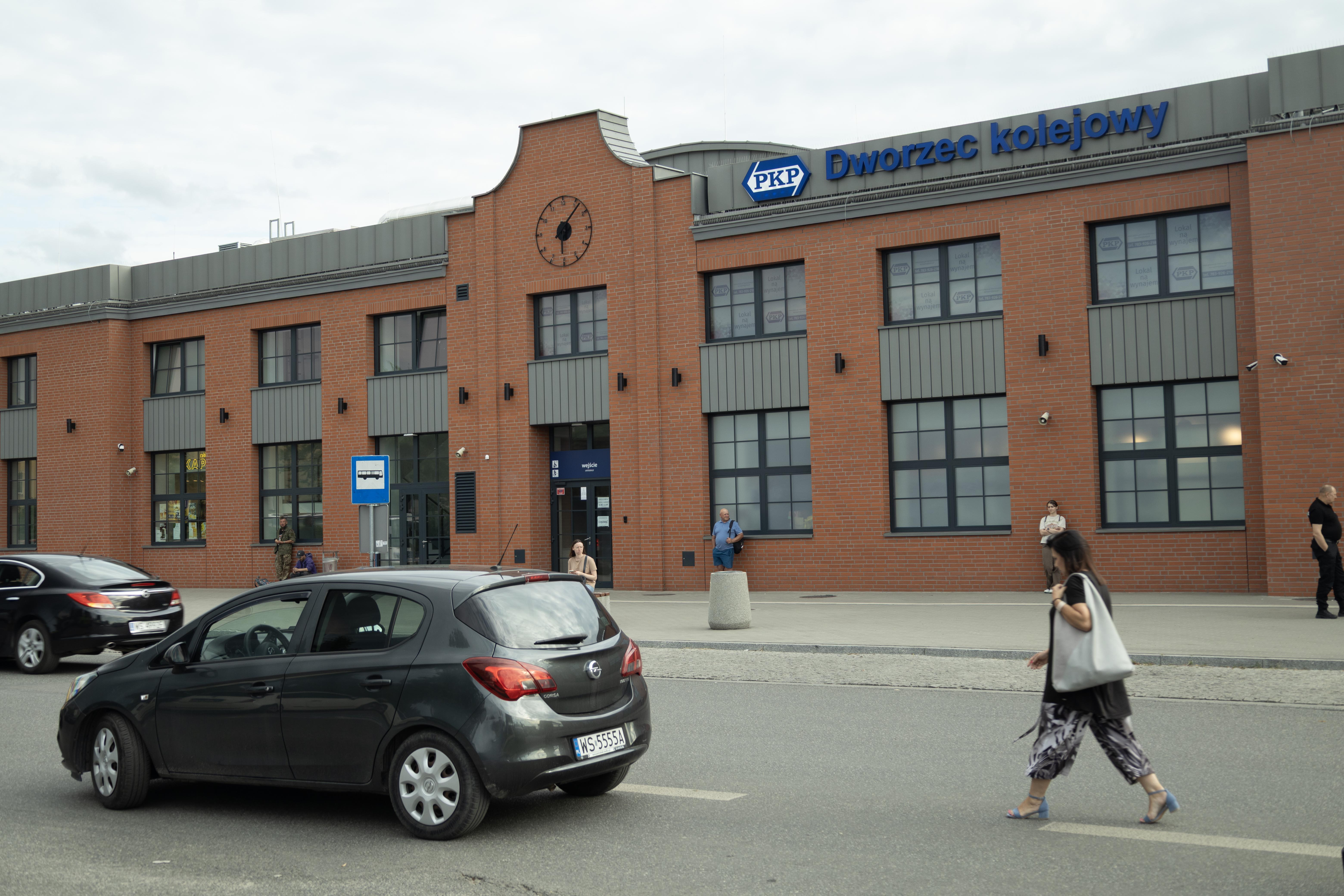

General information
- Location: Siedlce, Masovian; Poland
- Coordinates: 52°09′42″N 22°16′21″E
- Owner: Polskie Koleje Państwowe S.A.
- Platforms: 3
- Tracks: 5

Construction
- Structure type: Building: Yes

History
- Opened: 1866

Services
Preceding station	Masovian Railways	Following station
Siedlce Zachodnie towards Warszawa Zachodnia	R2	Siedlce Wschodnie towards Łuków
Terminus	R21	Stok Lacki towards Czeremcha
Preceding station	PKP Intercity	Following station
Mińsk Mazowiecki towards Warszawa Zachodnia	Kyiv-Express	Łuków towards Kyiv-Pasazhyrskyi
Location
- Location within Masovian Voivodeship Location within Poland Location within Europe

Siedlce railway station is a railway station in Siedlce, Poland. As of 2011, it is served by Masovian Railways (which runs the KM2 services from Warszawa Zachodnia to Łuków and KM31 services from Siedlce to Czeremcha), Polregio (InterRegio services between Łuków and Bielsko Biała Główna), and PKP Intercity. The station was opened in 1866.
