= Łuków railway station =

Railway station in Łuków, Poland

Łuków
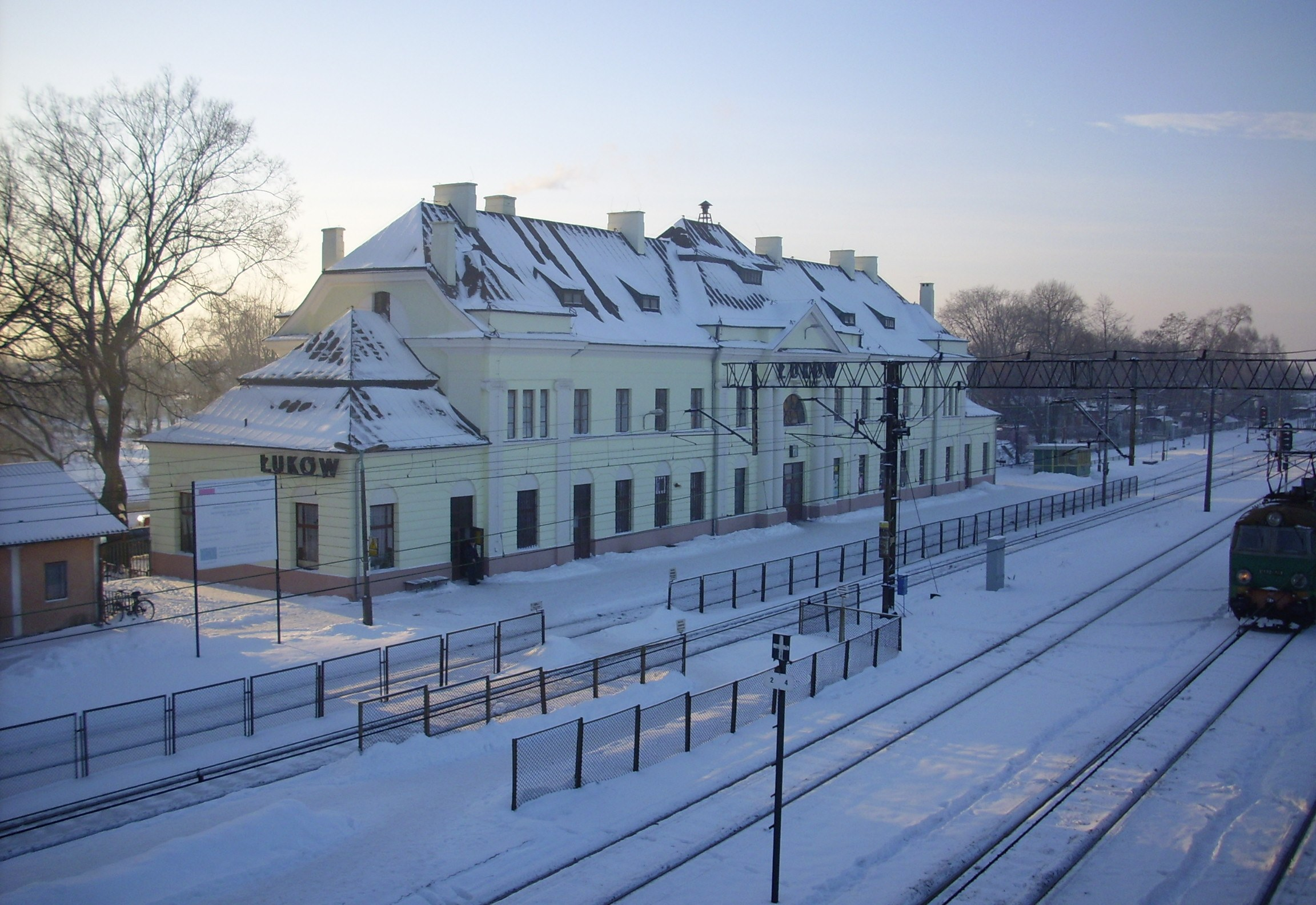

General information
- Location: Łuków, Lublin; Poland
- Coordinates: 51°56′29″N 22°23′23″E
- Owner: Polskie Koleje Państwowe S.A.
- Platforms: 2
- Tracks: 4

Construction
- Structure type: Building: Yes

History
- Opened: 1866

Services
Preceding station	Masovian Railways	Following station
Krynka Łukowska towards Warszawa Zachodnia	R2	Terminus
Preceding station	PKP Intercity	Following station
Siedlce towards Warszawa Zachodnia	Kyiv-Express	Lublin Główny towards Kyiv-Pasazhyrskyi
Location

Łuków railway station is a railway station serving Łuków, Poland. It is served by Masovian Railways (which runs services from Łuków to Warszawa Zachodnia), Polregio (local and InterRegio services), PKP Intercity (TLK services) and some international trains.

It was opened in 1866.
