= Opacz railway station =

Commuter railway station in Opacz-Kolonia, Poland

Coordinates: 52.1811°N 20.8851°E

Opacz
- Station in September 2021

General information
- Location: Opacz-Kolonia, Masovian Voivodeship; Poland
- System: Commuter rail
- Operator: Warsaw Commuter Railway
- Line: Warszawa Śródmieście WKD–Grodzisk Mazowiecki Radońska
- Platforms: 2
- Tracks: 2

Other information
- Fare zone: 1
- Website: Opacz

History
- Opened: 11 December 1927
Location
- Location within Poland

Opacz-Kolonia is a railway station of the Warsaw Commuter Railway located in the village of Opacz-Kolonia, within central Poland.

== History ==
The station opened on 11 December 1927.

== Train services ==
Train services are operated by the Warsaw Commuter Railway (WKD); the station is in fare zone 1. On weekdays, services operate every 10 minutes during peak hours and every 15 minutes during off-peak hours, and every 20 minutes during weekends and public holidays. The station is also in the ZTM–KM–WKD ticket fare zone.

Preceding station	Warsaw Commuter Railway	Following station
Michałowice towards Grodzisk Mazowiecki Radońska or Milanówek Grudów	WKD	Warszawa Salomea towards Warszawa Śródmieście WKD
