= Podkowa Leśna Zachodnia railway station =

Commuter railway station in Podkowa Leśna, Poland

Coordinates: 52°07′15″N 20°42′45″E

Podkowa Leśna Zachodnia Podkowa Leśna West
- Class EN97 arriving into the station in July 2025

General information
- Location: Podkowa Leśna, Masovian Voivodeship; Poland
- System: Commuter rail
- Operator: Warsaw Commuter Railway
- Lines: Warszawa Śródmieście WKD–Grodzisk Mazowiecki Radońska; Podkowa Leśna Główna–Milanówek Grudów
- Platforms: 2
- Tracks: 2

Other information
- Fare zone: 3
- Website: Podkowa Leśna Zachodnia

History
- Opened: 30 September 1936
Location
- Location within Poland

Podkowa Leśna Zachodnia is a railway station of the Warsaw Commuter Railway (WKD) located in the town of Podkowa Leśna, within central Poland.

The station is a junction as the Podkowa Leśna Główna–Milanówek Grudów railway branches off the main section of WKD northwards to Milanówek Grudów.

== History ==
The station opened on 30 September 1936 with the extension to Milanówek Grudów.

In 2021, part of the double-tracking of the Podkowa Leśna Główna–Grodzisk Mazowiecki Radońska section of the Warszawa Śródmieście WKD–Grodzisk Mazowiecki Radońska railway, the station was rebuilt with two platforms and a junction allowing for trains to switch tracks. The project was completed in December 2023.

== Train services ==
Train services are operated by WKD; the station is in fare zone 3. On weekdays, services operate every 10 minutes during peak hours and every 15 minutes during off-peak hours, and every 20 minutes during weekends and public holidays.

Preceding station	Warsaw Commuter Railway	Following station
Kazimierówka towards Grodzisk Mazowiecki Radońska	WKD	Podkowa Leśna Główna towards Warszawa Śródmieście WKD
Polesie towards Milanówek Grudów	WKD	Podkowa Leśna Główna towards Warszawa Śródmieście WKD
