= Warszawa Salomea railway station =

Commuter railway station in Warsaw, Poland

Coordinates: 52.1865°N 20.9245°E

Warszawa Salomea Warsaw Salomea
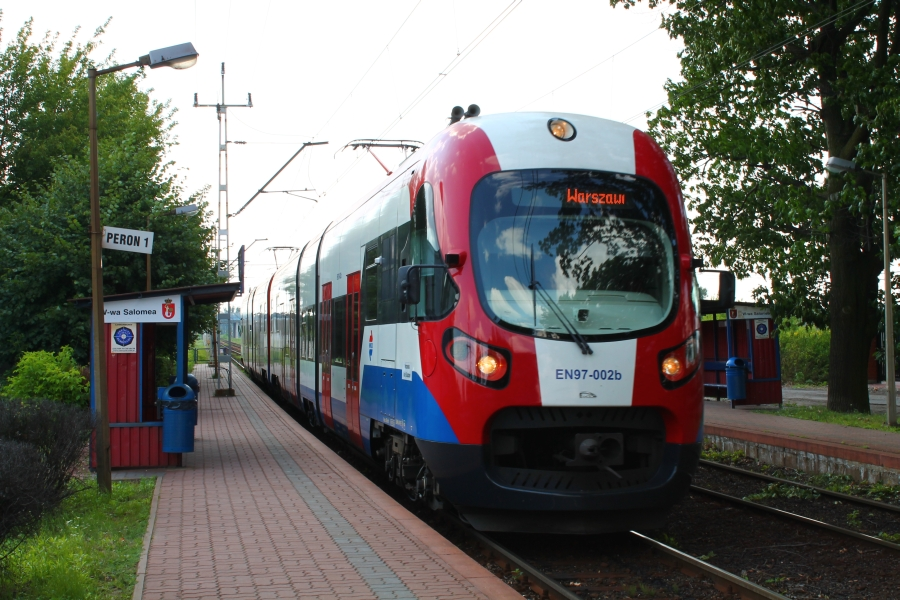
- Class EN97 at the station in July 2014

General information
- Location: Salomea, Warsaw, Masovian Voivodeship; Poland
- System: Commuter rail
- Operator: Warsaw Commuter Railway
- Line: Warszawa Śródmieście WKD–Grodzisk Mazowiecki Radońska
- Platforms: 2
- Tracks: 2

Other information
- Fare zone: 1
- Website: Warszawa Salomea

History
- Opened: 11 December 1927
- Former names: Salomea (1927–1959)
Location
- Location within Poland

Warszawa Salomea is a railway station of the Warsaw Commuter Railway located in the Salomea neighbourhood of Warsaw, within central Poland.

== History ==
The station opened on 11 December 1927 as Salomea. It was renamed to Warszawa Salomea in 1959.

== Train services ==
Train services are operated by the Warsaw Commuter Railway (WKD); the station is in fare zone 1. On weekdays, services operate every 10 minutes during peak hours and every 15 minutes during off-peak hours, and every 20 minutes during weekends and public holidays. The station is also in the ZTM–KM–WKD ticket fare zone.

Preceding station	Warsaw Commuter Railway	Following station
Opacz towards Grodzisk Mazowiecki Radońska or Milanówek Grudów	WKD	Warszawa Raków towards Warszawa Śródmieście WKD
