= Pruszków WKD railway station =

Commuter railway station in Pruszków, Poland

Coordinates: 52.1616°N 20.8166°E

Pruszków WKD
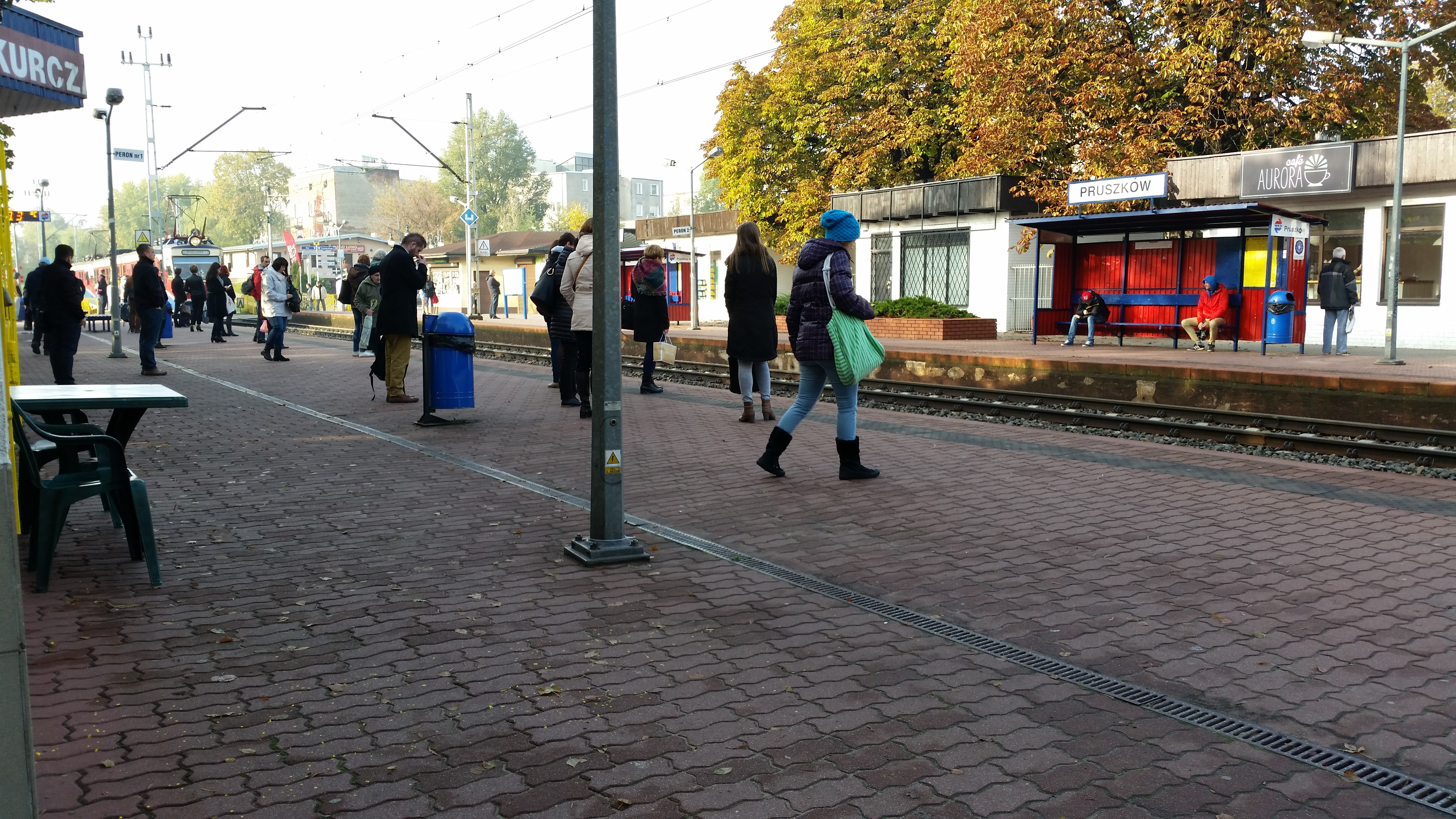
- Station in October 2015

General information
- Location: Pruszków, Masovian Voivodeship; Poland
- System: Commuter rail
- Operator: Warsaw Commuter Railway
- Line: Warszawa Śródmieście WKD–Grodzisk Mazowiecki Radońska
- Platforms: 2
- Tracks: 2
- Connections: Pruszków railway station

Other information
- Fare zone: 2
- Website: Pruszków WKD

History
- Opened: 11 December 1927
- Former names: Pruszów EDK (1927–1949)
Location
- Location within Poland

Pruszków WKD is a railway station of the Warsaw Commuter Railway located in the town of Pruszków, Poland. It is located approximately 1.6 km (0.99 mi) from the mainline station, Pruszków.

== History ==
The station opened on 11 December 1927 as Pruszków EKD. It was renamed to Pruszków WKD in 1949.

There are proposals to build a new line branching of the WKD network to connect with Pruszków's mainline station.

== Train services ==
Train services are operated by the Warsaw Commuter Railway; the station is in zone 2. On weekdays, trains operate every 10 minutes during peak hours and every 15 minutes during off-peak hours, and every 20 minutes during weekends and public holidays.

Preceding station	Warsaw Commuter Railway	Following station
Komorów towards Grodzisk Mazowiecki Radońska or Milanówek Grudów	WKD	Tworki towards Warszawa Śródmieście WKD
