= Podkowa Leśna Główna railway station =

Commuter railway station in Podkowa Leśna, Poland

Coordinates: 52.1223°N 20.7251°E

Podkowa Leśna Główna Podkowa Leśna Main
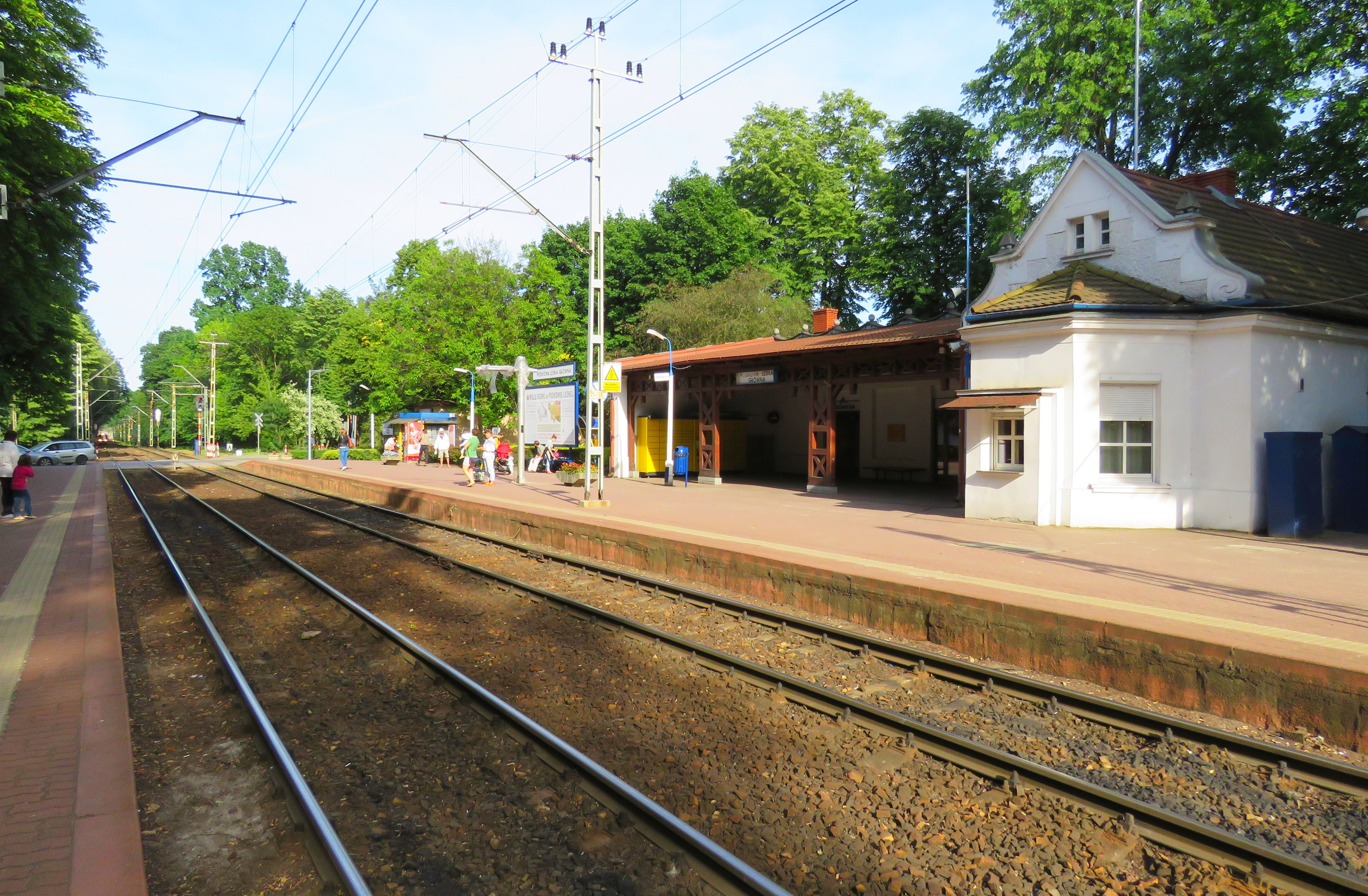
- Station in June 2016

General information
- Location: Podkowa Leśna, Masovian Voivodeship; Poland
- System: Commuter rail
- Operator: Warsaw Commuter Railway
- Lines: Warszawa Śródmieście WKD–Grodzisk Mazowiecki Radońska; Podkowa Leśna Główna–Milanówek Grudów
- Platforms: 2
- Tracks: 2

Other information
- Fare zone: 3
- Website: Podkowa Leśna Główna

History
- Opened: 11 December 1927
- Former names: Podkowa Leśna (1927–1929)
Location
- Location within Poland

Podkowa Leśna Główna is a railway station of the Warsaw Commuter Railway (WKD) located in the town of Podkowa Leśna, within central Poland.

The station is the starting point of the Podkowa Leśna Główna–Milanówek Grudów railway, where it shares track with the Warszawa Śródmieście WKD–Grodzisk Mazowiecki Radońska railway until it branches off at Podkowa Leśna Zachodnia where it heads northwards to Milanówek Grudów.

== History ==
The station opened on 11 December 1927 as Podkowa Leśna. It was renamed to Podkowa Leśna Główna in 1929.

== Train services ==
Train services are operated by WKD; the station is in fare zone 3. On weekdays, services operate every 10 minutes during peak hours and every 15 minutes during off-peak hours, and every 20 minutes during weekends and public holidays.

Preceding station	Warsaw Commuter Railway	Following station
Podkowa Leśna Zachodnia towards Grodzisk Mazowiecki Radońska or Milanówek Grudów	WKD	Podkowa Leśna Wschodnia towards Warszawa Śródmieście WKD
