= Warszawa Aleje Jerozolimskie railway station =

Railway station in Warsaw, Poland

Warszawa Aleje Jerozolimskie
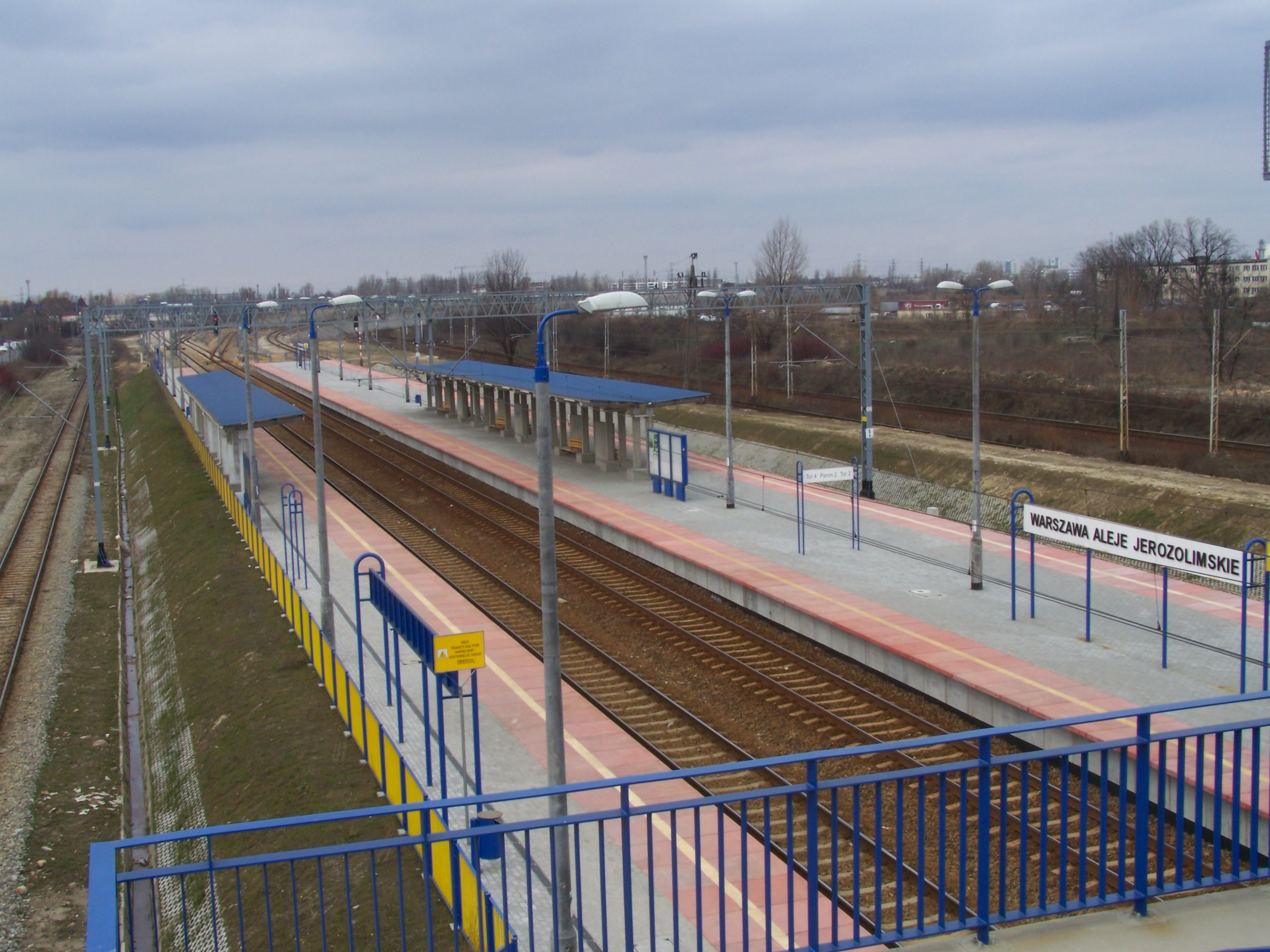

General information
- Location: Ochota, Warsaw, Masovian; Poland
- Coordinates: 52°12′22″N 20°56′27″E
- Owner: Polskie Koleje Państwowe S.A.
- Platforms: 3
- Tracks: 5

Construction
- Structure type: Building: No

History
- Opened: 1974

Services
Preceding station	Masovian Railways	Following station
Warszawa Rakowiec towards Góra Kalwaria or Skarżysko-Kamienna	R8	Warszawa Zachodnia towards Warszawa Wschodnia
Warszawa Rakowiec towards Warsaw Chopin Airport	RL	Warszawa Zachodnia towards Modlin
Preceding station	SKM Warsaw	Following station
Warszawa Rakowiec towards Warsaw Chopin Airport	S2	Warszawa Zachodnia towards Sulejówek Miłosna
Warszawa Rakowiec towards Warsaw Chopin Airport	S3	Warszawa Zachodnia towards Legionowo Piaski or Radzymin
Warszawa Rakowiec towards Piaseczno	S4	Warszawa Zachodnia towards Zegrze Południowe
Preceding station	Warsaw Commuter Railway	Following station
Warszawa Raków towards Grodzisk Mazowiecki Radońska or Milanówek Grudów	WKD	Warszawa Reduta Ordana towards Warszawa Śródmieście WKD
Location

Warszawa Aleje Jerozolimskie railway station is a railway station in the Ochota district of Warsaw, Poland. The station is built on a viaduct of Aleje Jerozolimskie. It handles trains from Warsaw Commuter Railway, from Warszawa Śródmieście WKD to Grodzisk Mazowiecki Radońska and Milanówek Grudów, and Masovian Railways, from Warszawa Wschodnia via Radom to Góra Kalwaria and Skarzysko Kamienna. The platforms for the Warsaw Commuter Railway were built in 1974 as part of the realignment of the route into central Warsaw. The platforms for Masovian Railways trains were added in 2008.

== Train services ==
Train services are also operated by the Warsaw Commuter Railway (WKD); the station is in fare zone 1. On weekdays, services operate every 10 minutes during peak hours and every 15 minutes during off-peak hours, and every 20 minutes during weekends and public holidays. The station is also in the ZTM–KM–WKD ticket fare zone.
