= Salomea, Warsaw =

Neighbourhood of Warsaw, Poland

Salomea
- City Information System area (neighbourhood)
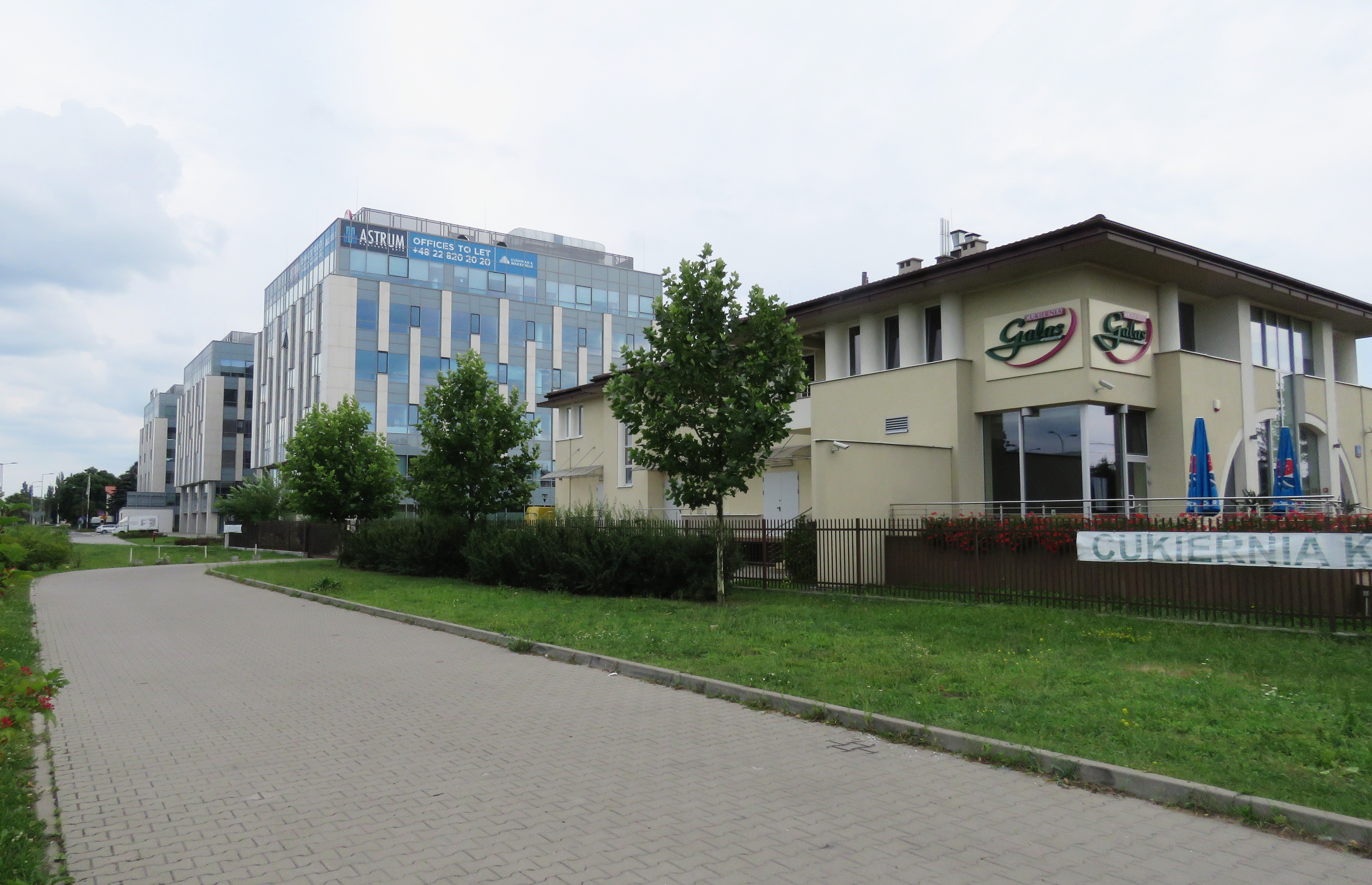
- Buildings on Łopuszańska Street in Salomea

- Salomea within the Włochy district.
- Coordinates: 52°11′23.16″N 20°55′36.20″E
- Country: Poland
- Voivodeship: Masovian
- City county: Warsaw
- District: Włochy
- Time zone: UTC+1 (CET)
  - Summer (DST): UTC+2 (CEST)
- Area code: +48 22

Salomea (Polish: [sa.lɔˈmɛ.a]) is a neighbourhood, and a City Information System area, in Warsaw, Poland, within the Włochy district. It is a mixed-use area, with low-rise houses, high-rise apartment and office buildings, and warehouses. It also includes two railway stations, Warszawa Raków, and Warszawa Salomea. In the 15th century, the village of Opacz (now Opacz Wielka) was founded in the area, and in the hamlet of Salomea was separated from it in the 19th century. It was incorporated into Warsaw in 1951.

== History ==
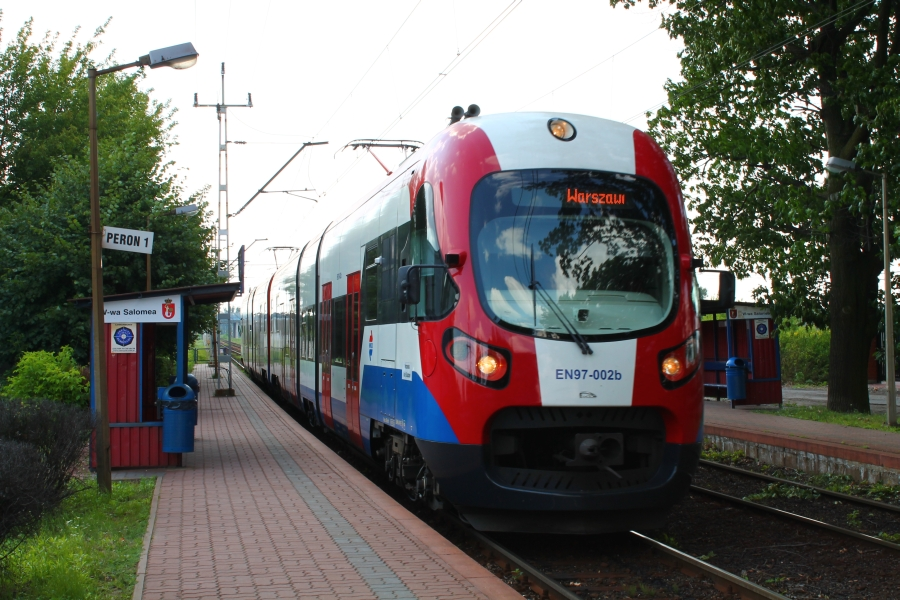
Warszawa Salomea railway station, opened in 1927.

At the end of the 15th century, the village of Opacz (now Opacz Wielka) was founded alongside modern Jutrzenki Street. In the 18th century, it was acquired by Arnold Anastazy Byszewski, the lieutenant general of the Crown Army, and the aide-de-camp of King Stanisław August Poniatowski, becoming part of his large landed estate. In the 19th century, the hamlet of Salomea was separated from the northwestern portion of Opacz. Following the abolition of serfdom in 1864, the area was incorporated into the municipality of Skorosze.

Between 1883 and 1888, the Fort V "Włochy" was constructed by the Imperial Russian Army, between Salomea and Włochy, as part of the city fortifications, known as the Warsaw Fortress. The government heavily restricted construction in its vicinity, hindering the development of the nearby villages. It was retired and partially demolished in 1913.

Salomea began to develop rapidly throughout the early 20th century. In 1927, the tracks of Electric Commuter Railways (now the Warsaw Commuter Railway) were constructed crossing the village, including two stations, Warszawa Salomea at the intersection of modern Jutrzenki and Serwituty Streets, and Warszawa Raków, originally known as Włochy EKD, on current Łopuszańska Street. On 1 April 1939, Salomea was incorporated to the new municipality of Okęcie. In 1943, Salomoea was inhabited by 174 people. On 15 May 1951, it was incorporated into the city of Warsaw. In 1973, the Kleszczowa bus garage was opened at 28 Kleszczowa Street in Salomea.

On 19 May 2004, the district of Włochy was subdivided into areas of the City Information System, with Salomea becoming one of them.

== Characteristics ==
Salomea is a mixed-use area, with low-rise houses, high-rise apartment and office buildings, and warehouses. The neighbourhood is crossed by the railway tracks with two stations, Warszawa Raków on Łopuszańska Street, and Warszawa Salomea at the intersection of Jutrzenki and Serwituty Streets. Salomea also includes Kleszczowa bus garage at 28 Kleszczowa Street.

== Location and boundaries ==
Salomea is a City Information System area in Warsaw, located in the central north portion of the Włochy district. Its boundaries are approximately determined by Kleszczowa Street, and Łopuszańska Street to the north; by Kociego Wąsa Street, Krakowiaków Street, and Działkowa Street to the east; around the buildings of Serwituty Street to the south; by Przerwa Street, Dojazdowa Street, and around the Kleszczowa bus garage. The neighbourhood borders Stare Włochy to the north, Raków to the northeast, Okęcie to the east, Opacz Wielka to the south, and the municipality of Michałowice to the west. Its western boundary forms the city border with Pruszków County.
