= Warszawa Raków railway station =

Commuter railway station in Warsaw, Poland

Coordinates: 52.1968°N 20.9661°E

Warszawa Raków Warsaw Raków
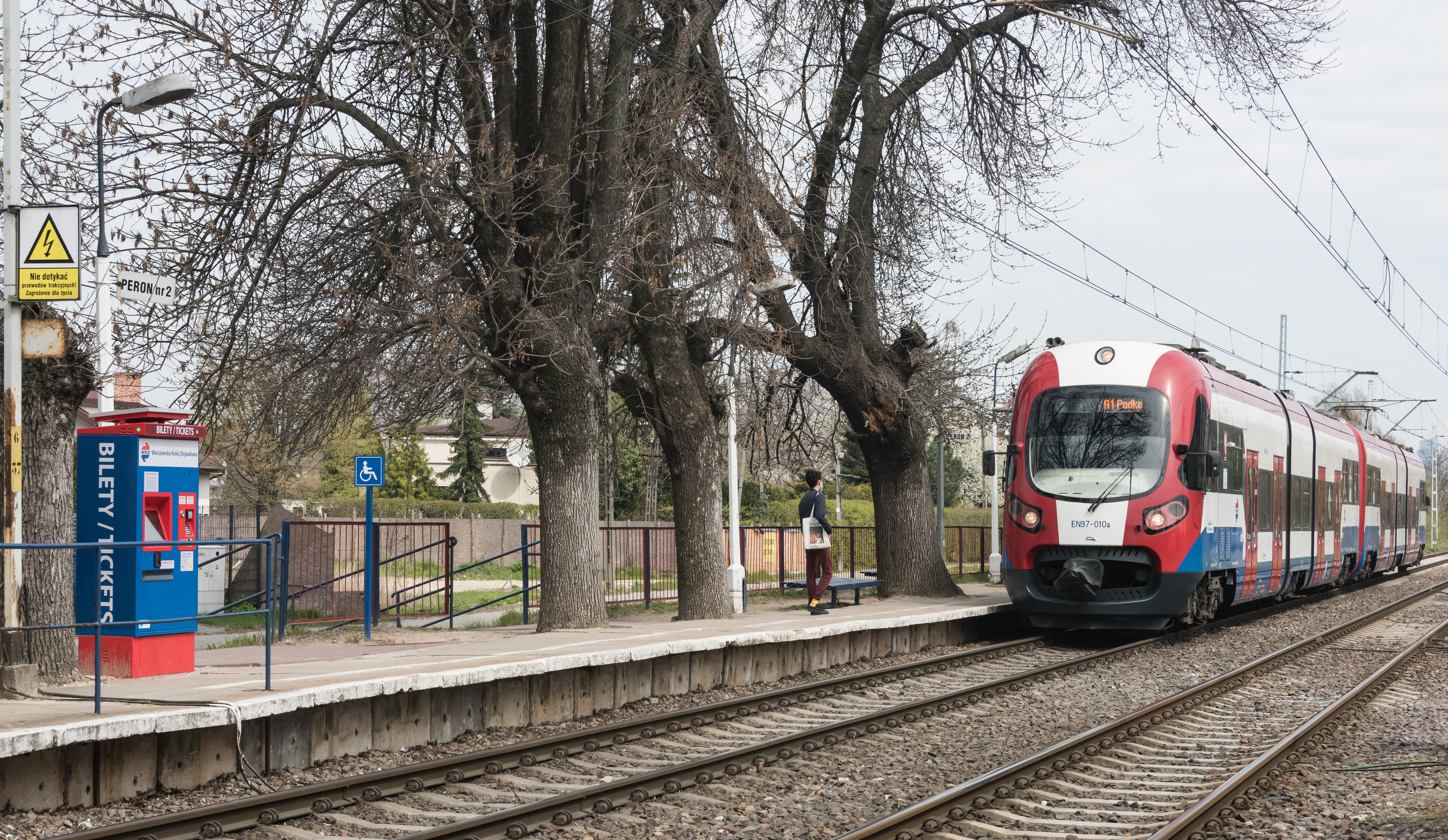
- Class EN97 approaches the station in April 2021

General information
- Location: Raków, Warsaw, Masovian Voivodeship; Poland
- System: Commuter rail
- Operator: Warsaw Commuter Railway
- Line: Warszawa Śródmieście WKD–Grodzisk Mazowiecki Radońska
- Platforms: 2
- Tracks: 2

Other information
- Fare zone: 1
- Website: Warszawa Raków

History
- Opened: 11 December 1927
- Former names: Włochy EKD (1927–1932); Raków (1932–1959)
Location
- Location within Poland

Warszawa Raków is a railway station of the Warsaw Commuter Railway located in the Raków district of Warsaw, within central Poland.

== History ==
The station opened on 11 December 1927 as Włochy EKD. It was renamed to Raków in 1932 and later to Warszawa Raków in 1959. Originally, Electric Commuter Railways operated a short spur to Warszawa Szczęśliwice. It was dismantled in 1975.

== Train services ==
Train services are operated by the Warsaw Commuter Railway (WKD); the station is in zone 1. On weekdays, services operate every 10 minutes during peak hours and every 15 minutes during off-peak hours, and every 20 minutes during weekends and public holidays. The station is also in the ZTM–KM–WKD ticket fare zone.

| Preceding station | Warsaw Commuter Railway | Following station |
|---|---|---|
| Warszawa Salomea towards Grodzisk Mazowiecki Radońska or Milanówek Grudów | WKD | Warszawa Aleje Jerozolimskie towards Warszawa Śródmieście WKD |
