= Warszawa Reduta Ordona railway station =

Railway station in Warsaw, Poland

Warszawa Reduta Ordona
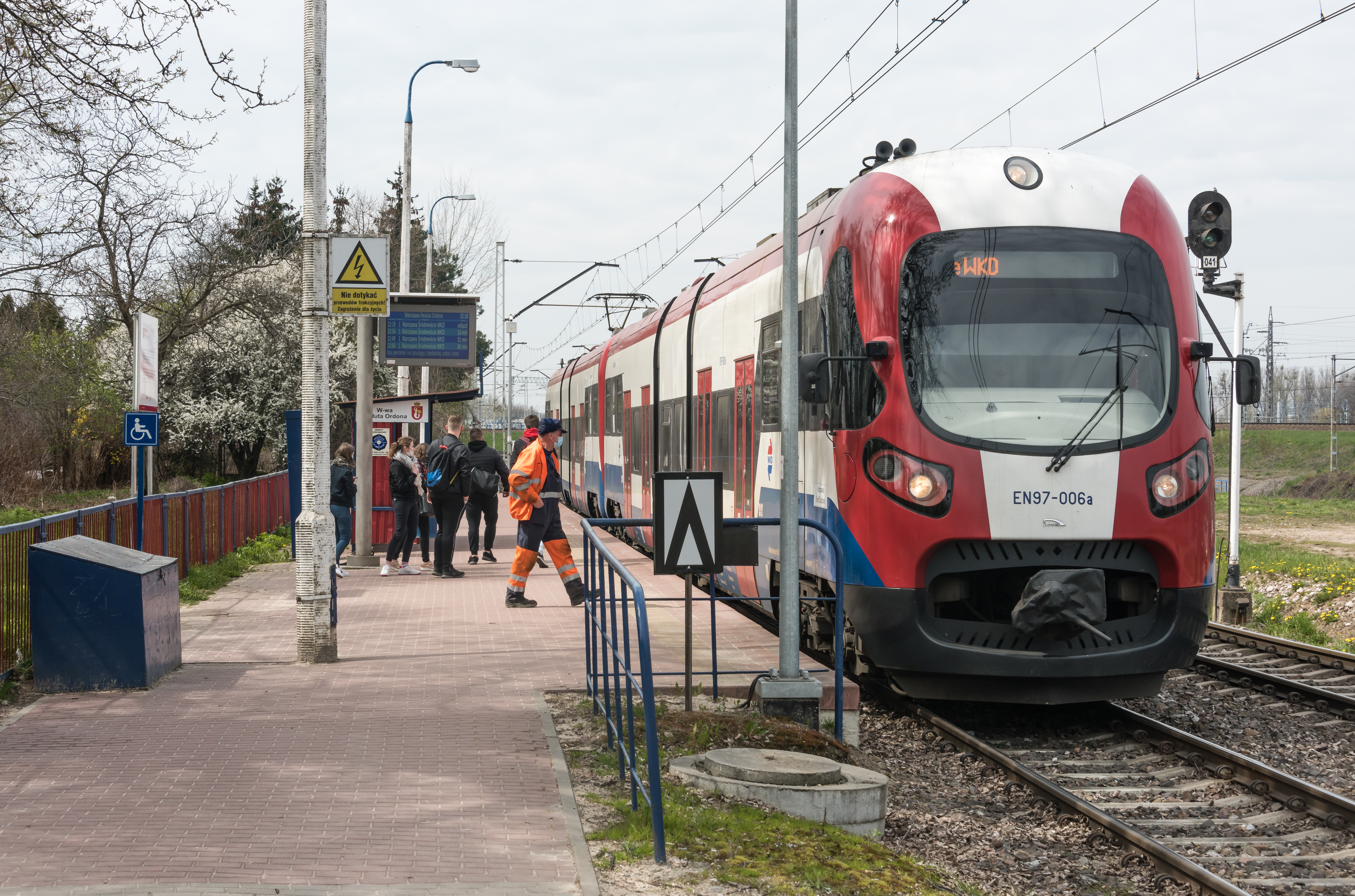

General information
- Location: Ochota/Wola, Warsaw, Masovian; Poland
- Coordinates: 52°12′52″N 20°56′53″E
- Owner: Polskie Koleje Państwowe S.A.
- Platforms: 2
- Tracks: 2

History
- Opened: 1974
- Former names: Warszawa Mszczonowska
Location
- Location of Warszawa Reduta Ordona within the Warsaw Railway Junction

Warszawa Reduta Ordona railway station is a railway station that lies between the Ochota and Wola districts of Warsaw, Poland. It serves the Warsaw Commuter Railway system and was built in 1974 when Warsaw Commuter Railway was realigned into the city centre along its present line.

== Train services ==
Train services are operated by the Warsaw Commuter Railway (WKD); the station is in fare zone 1. On weekdays, services operate every 10 minutes during peak hours and every 15 minutes during off-peak hours, and every 20 minutes during weekends and public holidays. The station is also in the ZTM–KM–WKD ticket fare zone.

Preceding station	Warsaw Commuter Railway	Following station
Warszawa Aleje Jerozolimskie towards Grodzisk Mazowiecki Radońska or Milanówek Grudów	WKD	Warszawa Zachodnia WKD towards Warszawa Śródmieście WKD
