= Opacz-Kolonia =

- Village
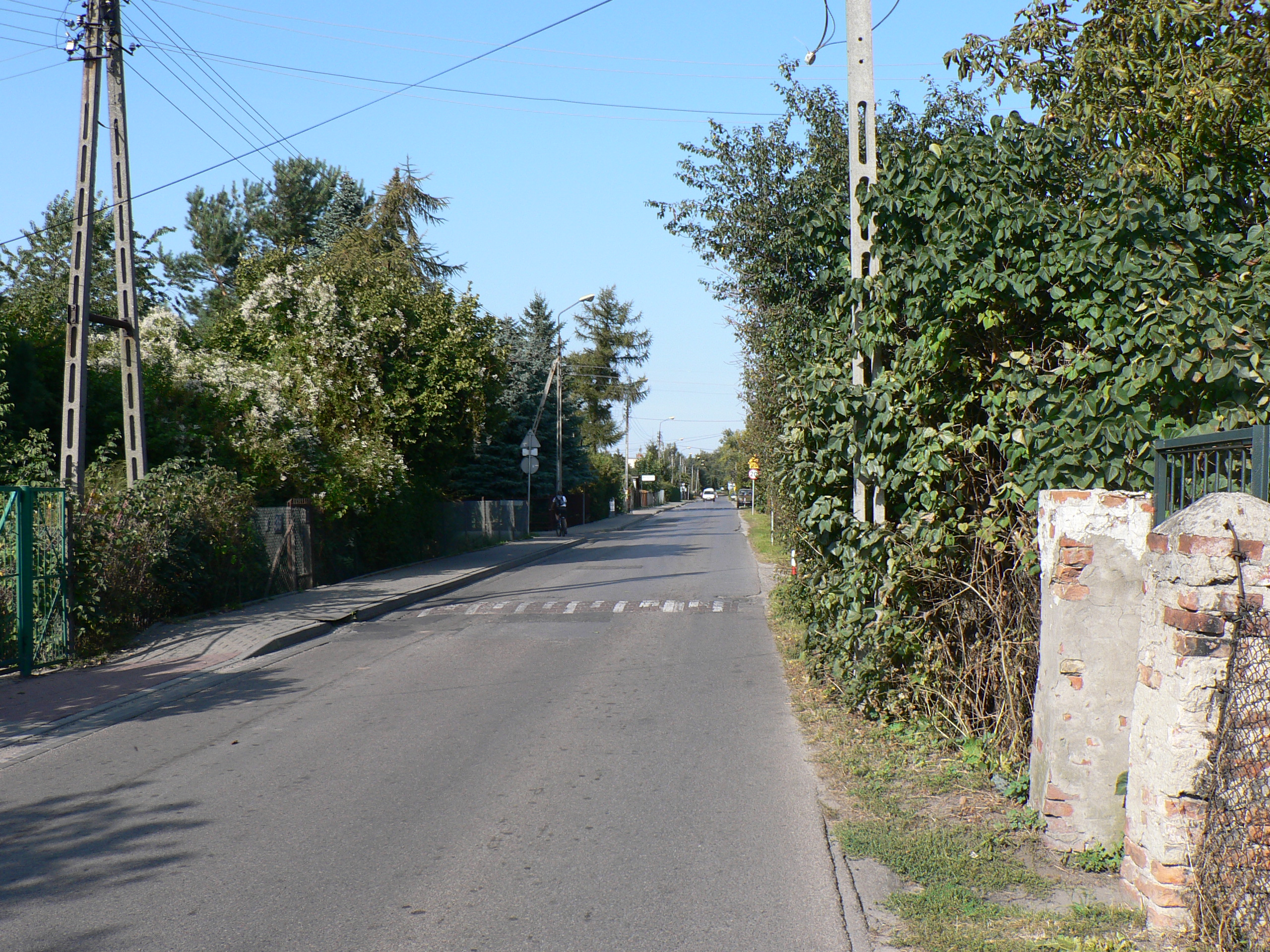

- Location within Poland
- Coordinates: 52°10′18″N 20°53′48″E
- Country: Poland
- Voivodeship: Masovian
- County: Pruszków
- Gmina: Michałowice

Population
  - Total: 1,200
- Time zone: UTC+1 (CET)
  - Summer (DST): UTC+2 (CEST)

Opacz-Kolonia [ˈɔpat͡ʂ kɔˈlɔɲa] is a village in the administrative district of Gmina Michałowice, within Pruszków County, Masovian Voivodeship, in east-central Poland.

== History ==
Six Polish citizens were murdered by Nazi Germany in the village during World War II.

== Transport ==
Opacz railway station of the Warsaw Commuter Railway serves the village.
