= Reduta =

Reduta is a Czech word meaning a masquerade ball, a building with a dance hall or a part of Baroque fortification (see Redoubt or redout). It may refer to:

- The building of the Slovak Philharmonic. It is called Reduta.
- Reduta Theatre, a theatre situated in Brno, Czech Republic
- Reduta Jazz Club, a music club and theatre situated in Prague, Czech Republic
- Warszawa Reduta Ordona railway station, a railway station in Poland
