= Warszawa Środmieście =

Warszawa Środmieście (English: Warsaw City Centre) may refer to

- Śródmieście, Warsaw borough of Warsaw
- Warszawa Śródmieście PKP station
- Warszawa Śródmieście WKD station
