= Pruszków =

City in Masovian Voivodeship, Poland

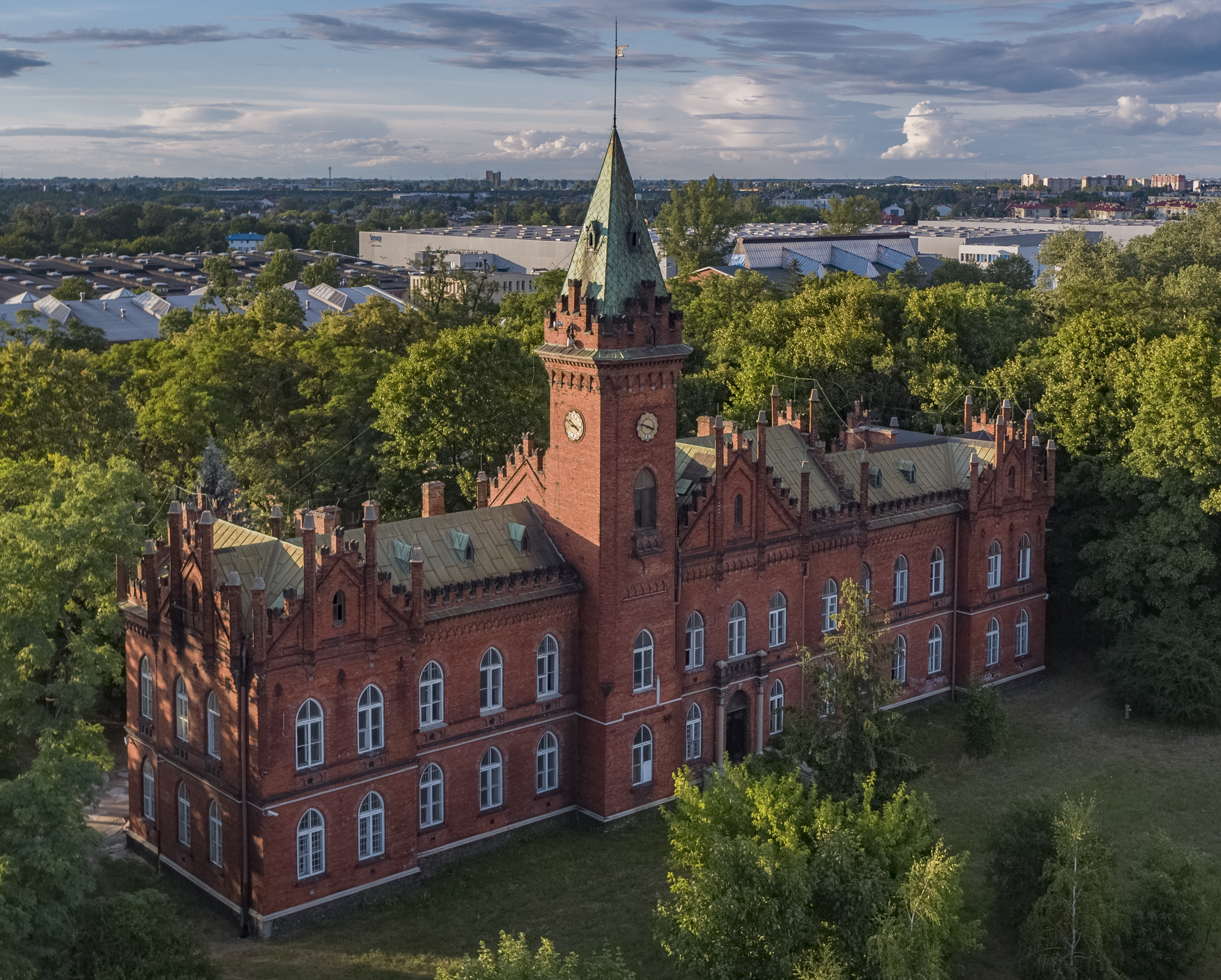
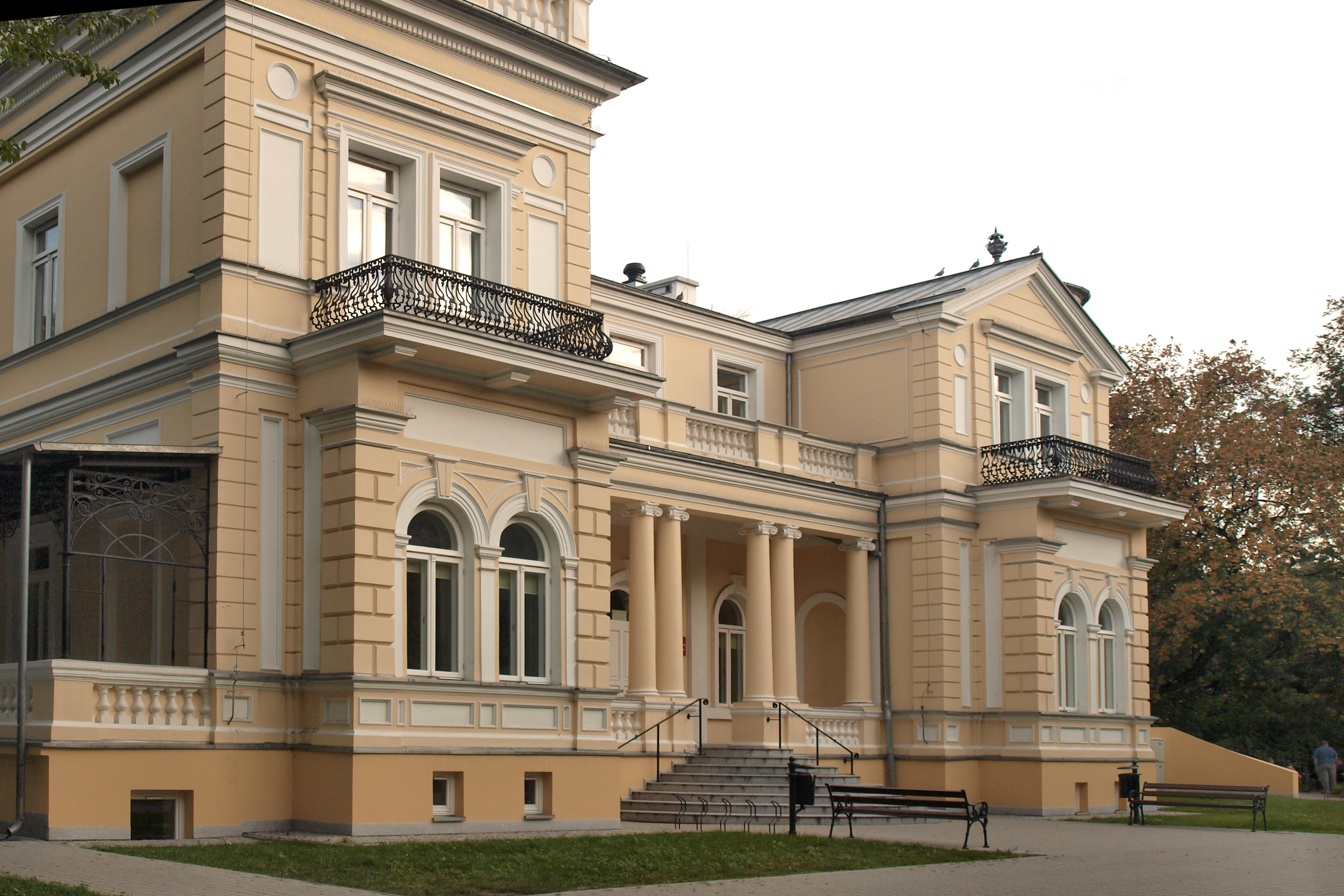
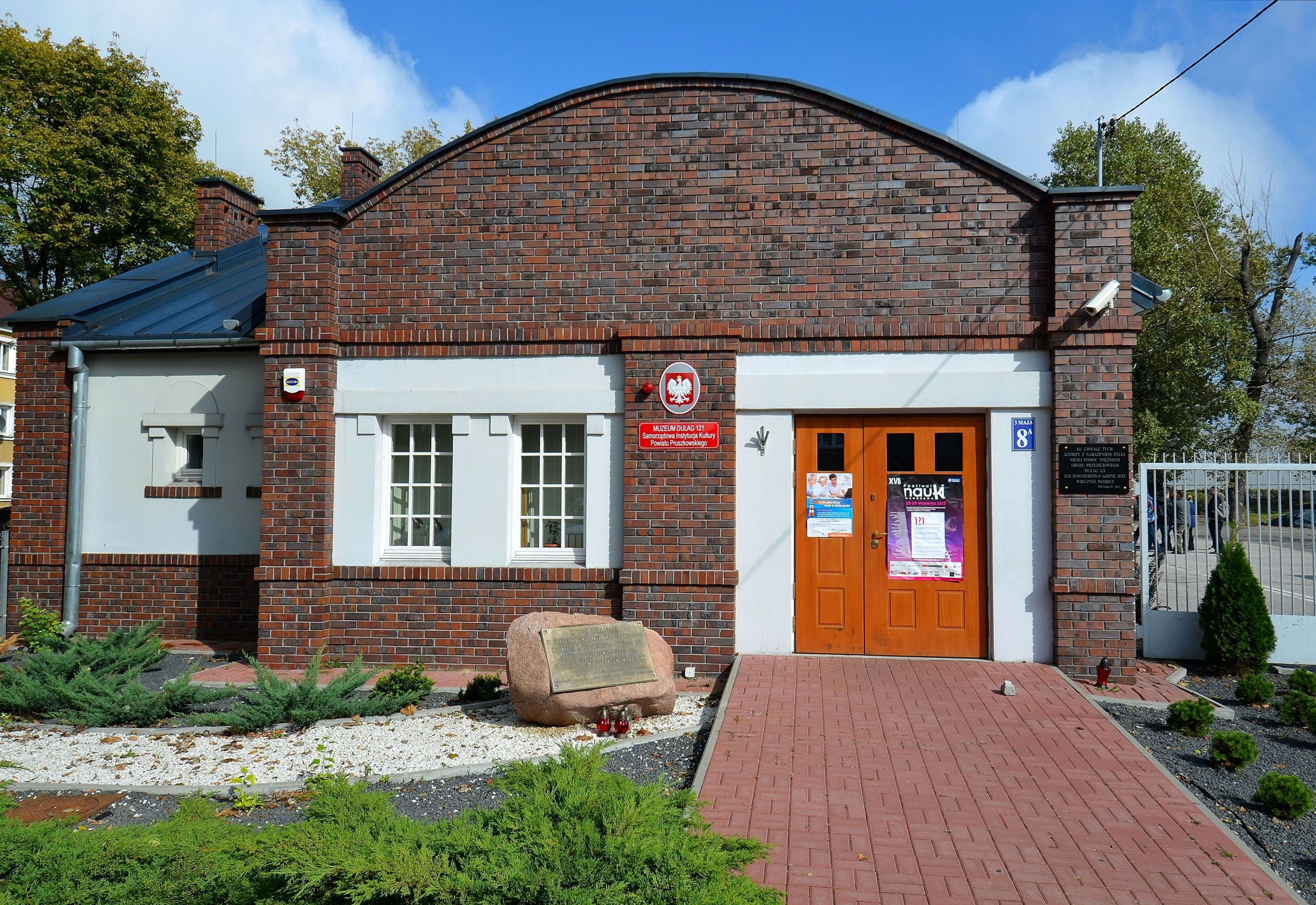
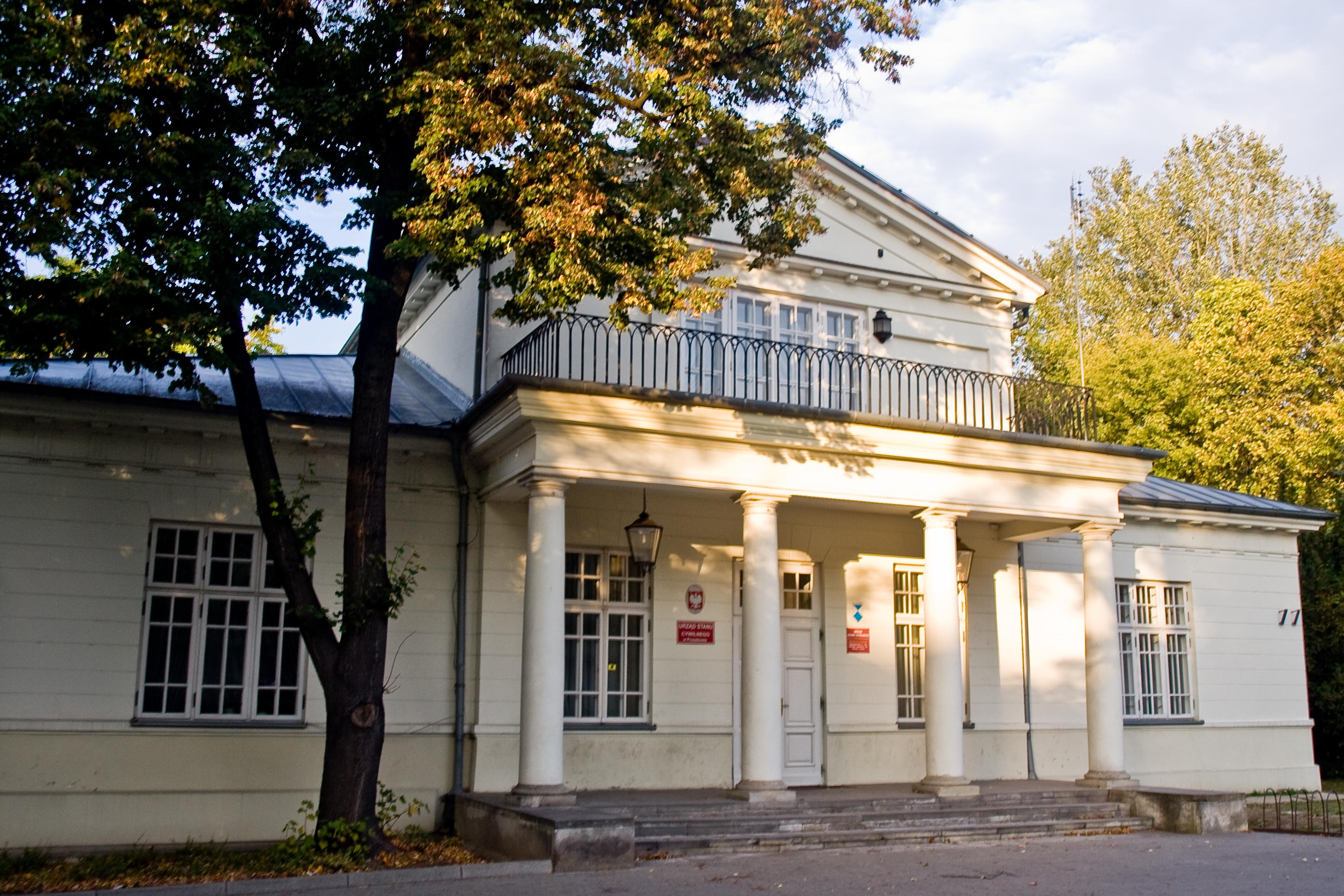
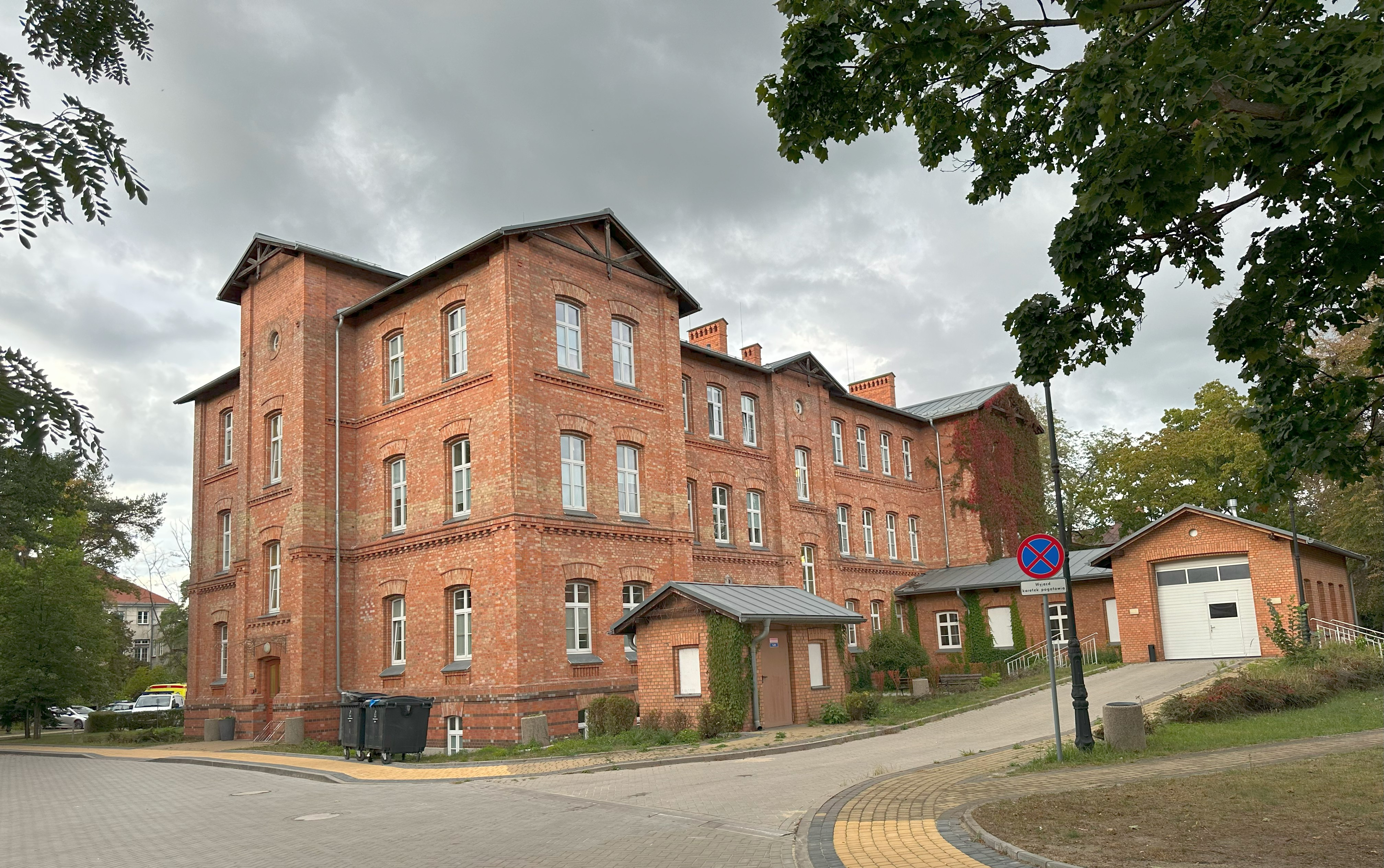
- Railway Repair Works Management Board Sokół Palace Dulag 121 Museum Potulicki Palace Hospital

- Flag Coat of arms
- Motto: Kolej na Pruszków! It's Pruszków's turn!
- Location within Poland
- Coordinates: 52°10′N 20°48′E
- Country: Poland
- Voivodeship: Masovian
- County: Pruszków
- Gmina: Pruszków (urban gmina)
- First mentioned: 15th century
- City rights: 1916

Government
  - City mayor: Piotr Bąk

Area
  - Total: 19.15 km^{2} (7.39 sq mi)

Population (31 December 2021)
  - Total: 62,750 ▲
  - Density: 3,277/km^{2} (8,487/sq mi)
- Time zone: UTC+1 (CET)
  - Summer (DST): UTC+2 (CEST)
- Postal code: 05-800, 05-802, 05-803, 05-804
- Area code: +48 22
- Vehicle registration: WPR
- Website: http://www.pruszkow.pl/

Pruszków [ˈpruʂkuf] is a city in east-central Poland, capital of Pruszków County in the Masovian Voivodeship. Pruszków is located along the western edge of the Warsaw metropolitan area.

Pruszków is the largest city in the Warsaw metropolitan area outside Warsaw. Since the 19th century it has developed as an industrial centre located on an important railway line. In the 1990s and 2000s the city was synonymous with the "Pruszków gang", one of two major organised crime groups in the country. It is known for the country's chief indoor velodrome and the Dulag 121 Museum at the former Nazi German camp for Poles expelled from Warsaw.

== History ==
=== Early history ===
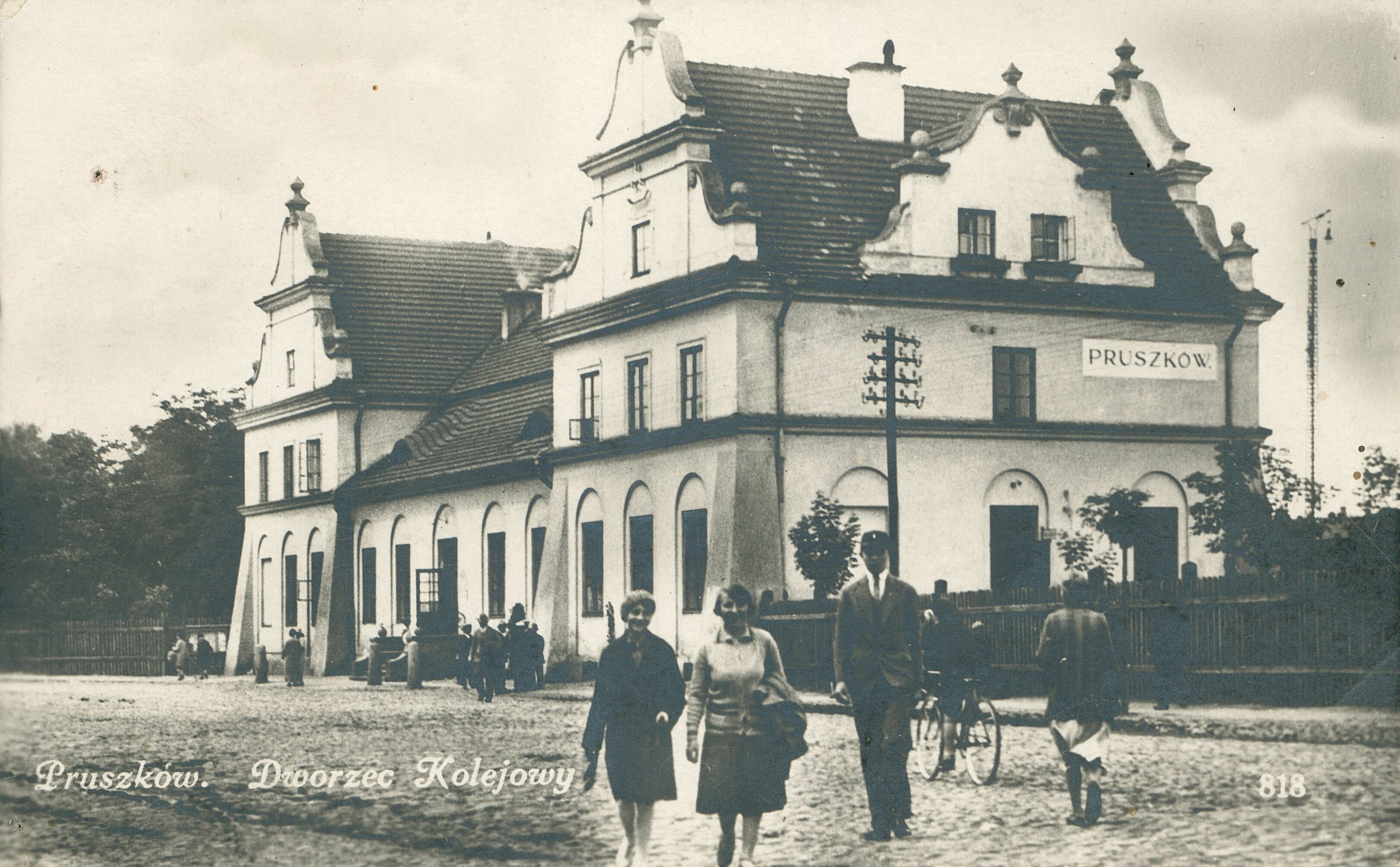
Pruszków railway station in the 1930s

Pruszków was incorporated as a town in 1916 during World War I, although the village was first mentioned in chronicles in the 15th century. Within the Kingdom of Poland, it was a private village of Polish nobility, administratively located in the Masovian Voivodeship in the Greater Poland Province. The development of the town was aided by the construction of the Warsaw-Vienna Railway in the 19th century and the construction of the Elektryczna Kolej Dojazdowa (now Warszawska Kolej Dojazdowa), Poland's first electrified commuter train line, in 1927. In the late 19th century, industry developed intensively in Pruszków. There were needles, porcelain, faience, and soap factories in Pruszków. A large psychiatric hospital opened in the outlying village of Tworki in 1891 and is still operating to this day.

During World War I, a battle between German and Russian forces took place in Pruszków on 12–18 October 1914 (part of Battle of the Vistula River). Despite the initial success of the German forces on 12 October, they were push-backed out of town after successful Russian counter-attack on 14th. An intense artillery fire by both sides caused severe damages to many buildings in Pruszków including train station, power plant, and two churches. In August 1915 Pruszków was taken by the German forces without a fight.

Within interwar Poland, it was administratively located in the Warsaw County in the Warsaw Voivodeship. According to the 1921 census, the population was 94.2% Polish and 5.6% Jewish.

=== World War II ===
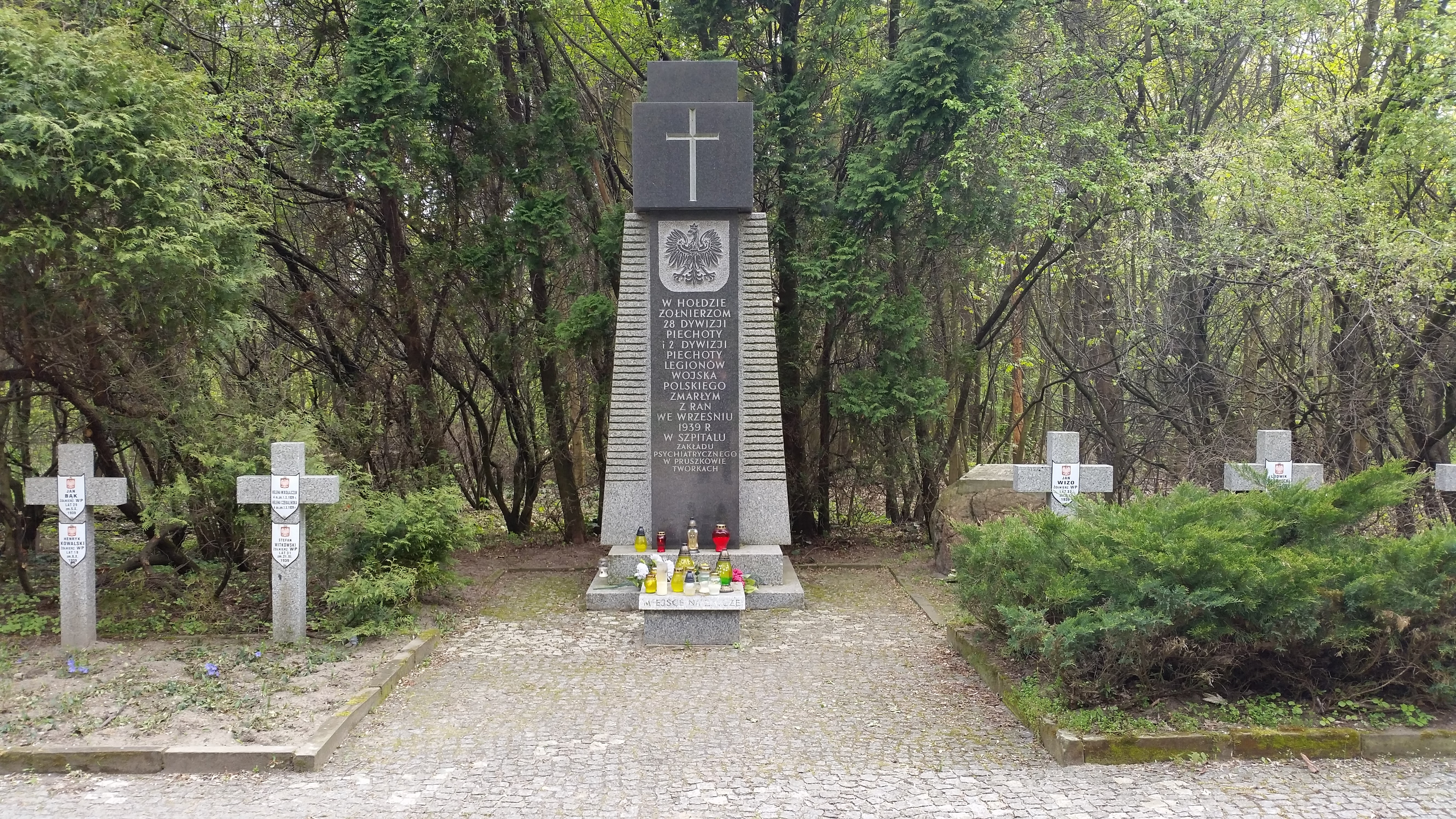
Cemetery of Polish soldiers killed during the German invasion of Poland in September 1939

The city was occupied by Germany following the German–Soviet invasion of Poland, which started World War II in September 1939. On 14 December 1939, the Germans murdered 46 Poles from Pruszków during the large Palmiry massacre. Over 15 Poles, who were either born, educated or lived and worked Pruszków, including several policemen, were murdered by the Russians in the Katyn massacre in 1940. Before the invasion, the city had a large Jewish population. In 1940, the German occupation authorities established a Jewish ghetto in Pruszków, in order to confine its Jewish population for the purpose of persecution and exploitation. The ghetto was liquidated on 31 January 1941, when all its 1,400–3,000 inhabitants were transported in cattle trucks to Warsaw Ghetto, the largest ghetto in all of Nazi occupied Europe with over 400,000 Jews crammed into an area of 1.3 square miles (3.4 km^{2}). From there, most victims were sent to Treblinka extermination camp.

The Polish resistance movement was present in Pruszków, and its activities included sabotage at railroad facilities, and distribution of Polish underground press. There was a local branch of the Home Army in Pruszków, which, at the start of the Warsaw Uprising in 1944, took control of the power plant in Pruszków and unsuccessfully attacked the radio station in Raszyn. The underground satirical magazine Hak was published in Pruszków.

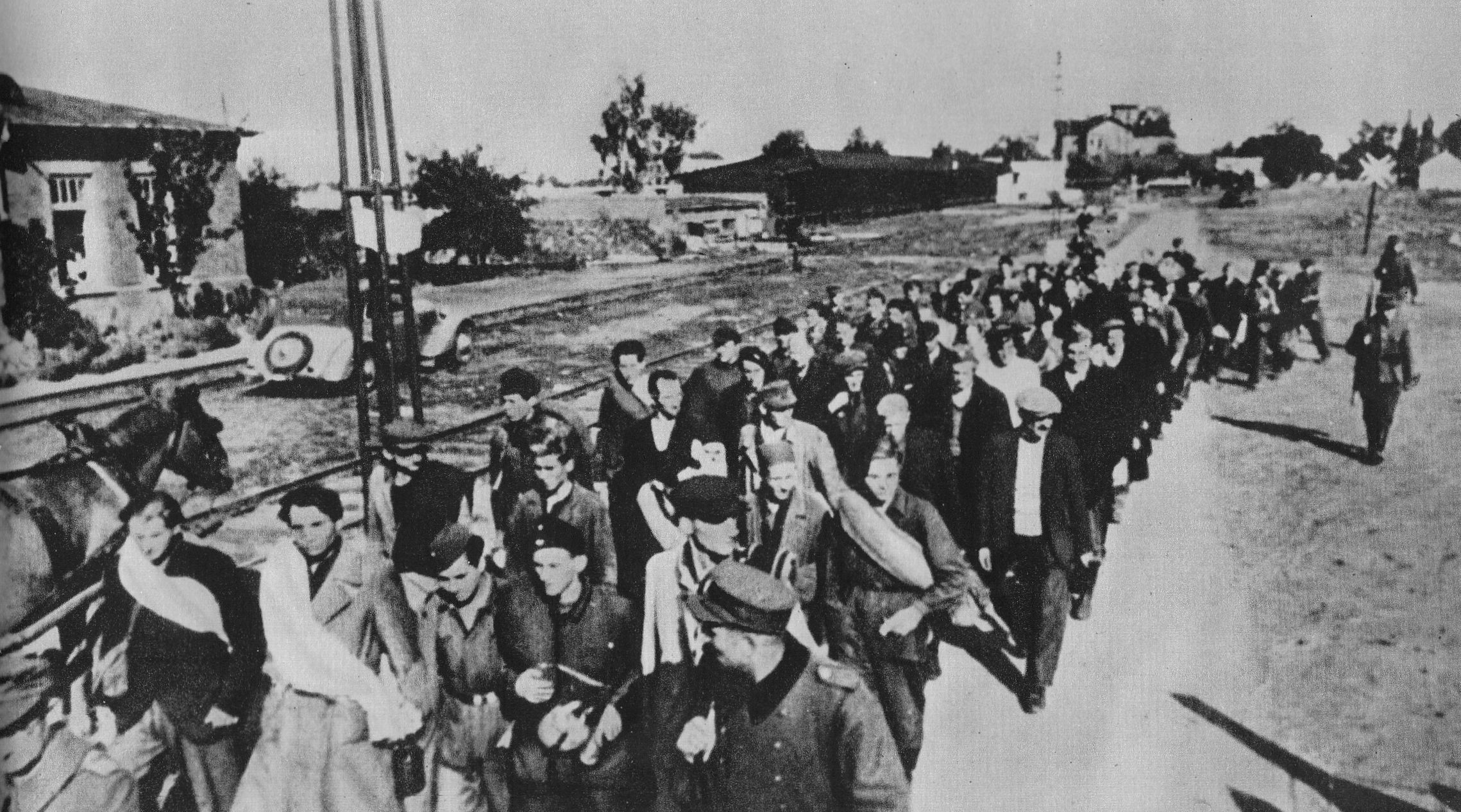
Polish insurgents in Pruszków in October 1944 after Warsaw's capitulation

During the Warsaw Uprising, the Nazis created the large Dulag 121 transit camp in Pruszków on the site of the Train Repair Shops (Zakłady Naprawcze Taboru Kolejowego) to intern the evacuees expelled from the capital. Around 550,000 Warsaw residents and approximately 100,000 more from its outskirts were incarcerated in the camp. The SS and Gestapo segregated the Poles, who were then either deported to forced labour in Germany, sent to Nazi concentration camps, or expelled to more southern locations of German-occupied Poland. Approximately 650,000 Poles passed through the Pruszków camp in August, September and October 1944. Approximately 55,000 were sent to concentration camps, including 13,500 to Auschwitz, 12,000 to Ravensbrück and 8,700 to Mauthausen. They included people from a variety of social classes and occupations (government officials, scholars, artists, physicians, merchants, and blue-collar workers), in varying physical conditions (the injured, the sick, invalids, and pregnant women), and of various ages from infants only a few weeks old to the elderly, aged 86 or more. In a few cases, these were also people of different ethnic backgrounds including Jews living on "Aryan papers." The Germans murdered several Polish Catholic monks and nuns in the camp. Some of the expelled Poles from Warsaw stayed in Pruszków.

Following the Soviet westward offensive, on 26 March 1945, the 16 members of the Polish Underground Government were invited by the Russians for talks, to a house in Pruszków on Armii Krajowej Street. They were captured by the Soviet NKVD agents, transported to USSR, imprisoned, tortured and sentenced in Moscow during the so-called Trial of the Sixteen.

=== Post-war Poland ===
Historic churches of Pruszków

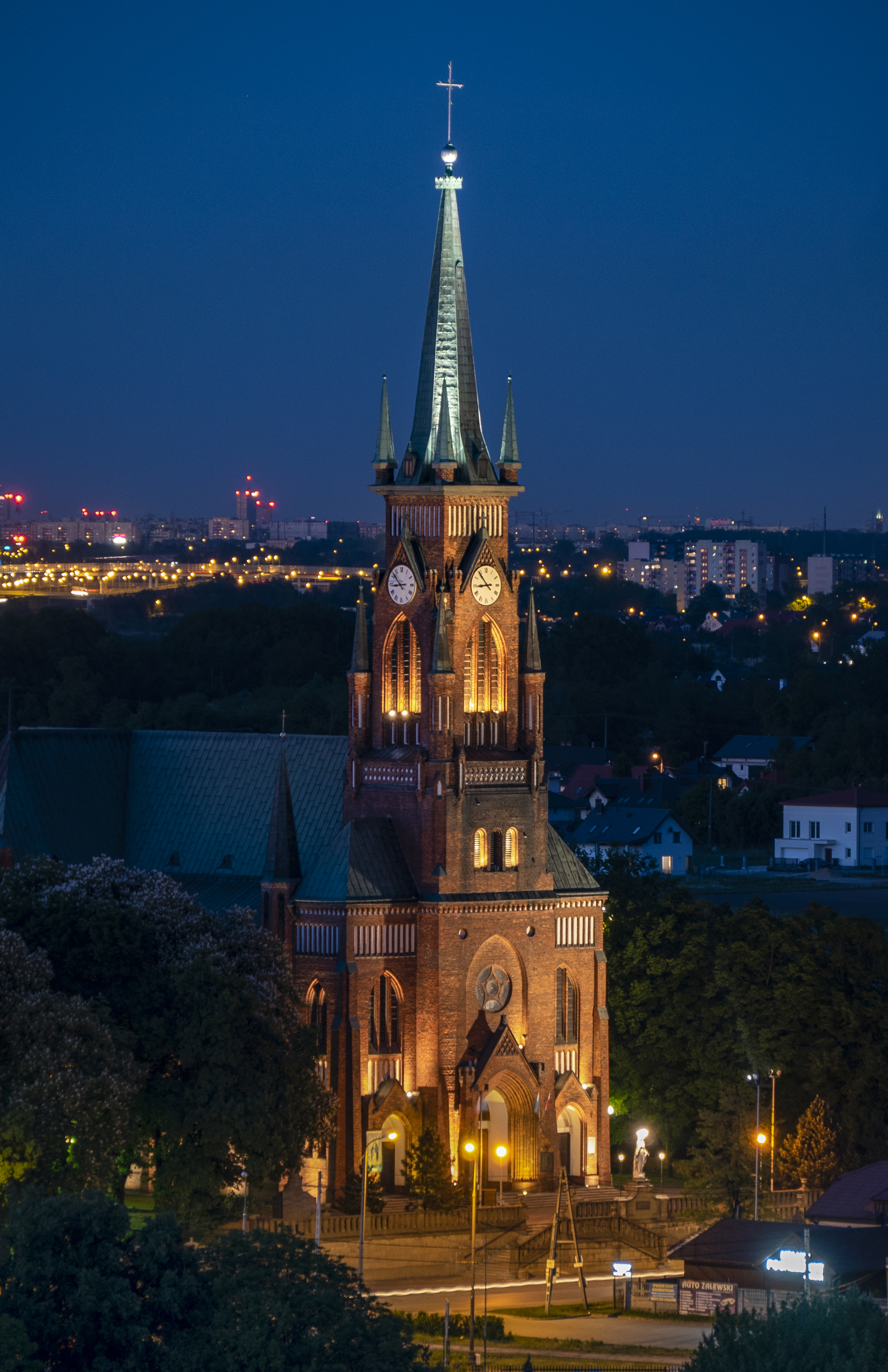
Immaculate Conception Church

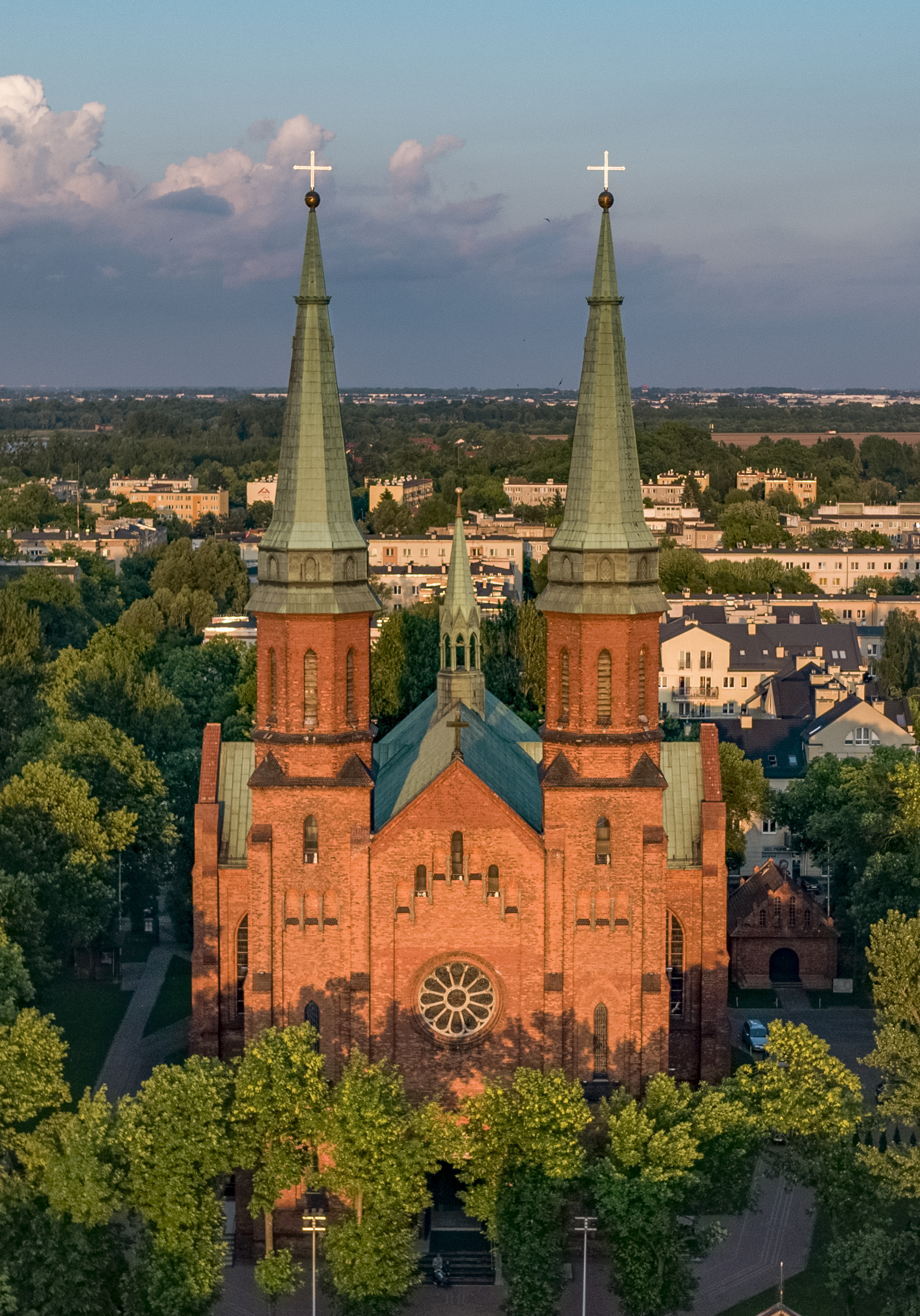
St. Casimir Church

After World War II, Pruszków became one of Masovia's largest industrial centers. It was previously in Warszawa Voivodeship (1975–1998). Due to its proximity to Warsaw, it is now home to several factories and companies, including Herbapol, Daewoo Electronics, L'Oréal Cosmetics as well as logistic centers. It is also an important sports center, with a sports gymnasium, soccer stadium and a cycling course.

== Crime ==
The best known of the Polish organised crime groups in the 1990s was the so-called "Pruszków mafia" and their arch-nemesis, the "Wołomin mafia",^{[quote]} with whom they fought bloody turf wars. Eventually the groups were finally crushed by the Polish police in cooperation with the German police in a spectacular raid on the A2 motorway between Konin and Poznań in September 2011.

== Transport ==
Pruszków railway station is served by mainline trains. The Warsaw Commuter Railway runs through the town and is served by Pruszków WKD railway station.

== Population ==
Historical population

Year	Pop.	±%
1910	15,994	—
1921	15,132	−5.4%
1931	23,703	+56.6%
1939	27,120	+14.4%

Year	Pop.	±%
1950	27,583	+1.7%
1960	38,016	+37.8%
2010	56,929	+49.8%
2020	62,623	+10.0%

== Sports ==
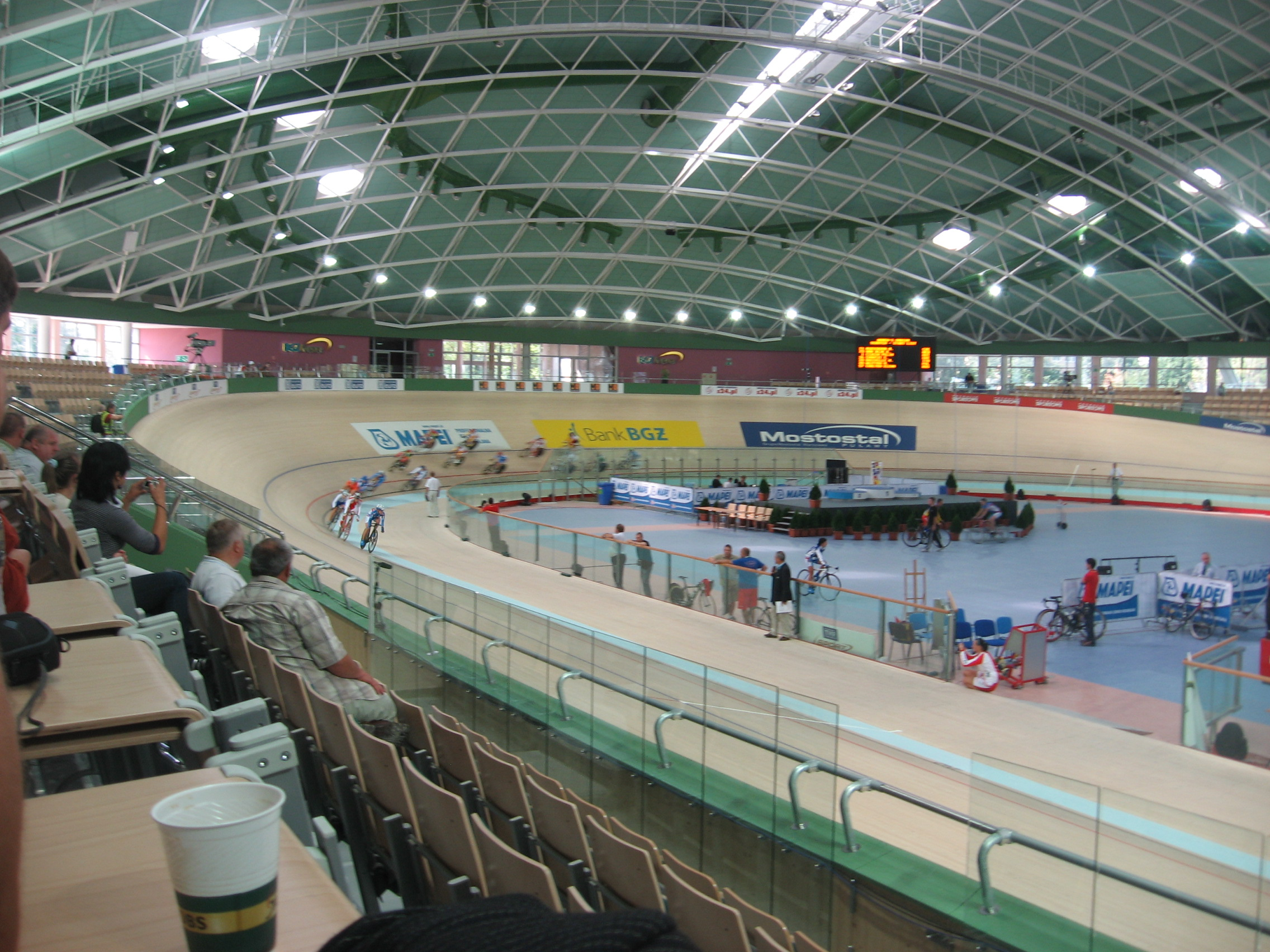
BGŻ Arena indoor velodrome

The city's local football team is Znicz Pruszków. It plays in the second division since 2023 where they previously competed between 2007-2010 and 2016-2017. Robert Lewandowski played for Znicz from 2006 to 2008, whereas Pruszków-born Jacek Gmoch and Radosław Majewski also played in Znicz: Gmoch from 1953 to 1958, Majewski from 2002 to 2006.

The city has two professional basketball teams: women's PTS Lider Pruszków and the basketball section of the football club, men's Znicz Basket Pruszków.

The Pruszków Arena is a modern indoor velodrome.

== Buildings and structures ==
256 metres tall chimney of former "Pruszków II Power Plant", now used as radio tower.

== Education ==
- Physical Culture and Tourism High School (Wyższa Szkoła Kultury Fizycznej i Turystyki)

== Notable people ==
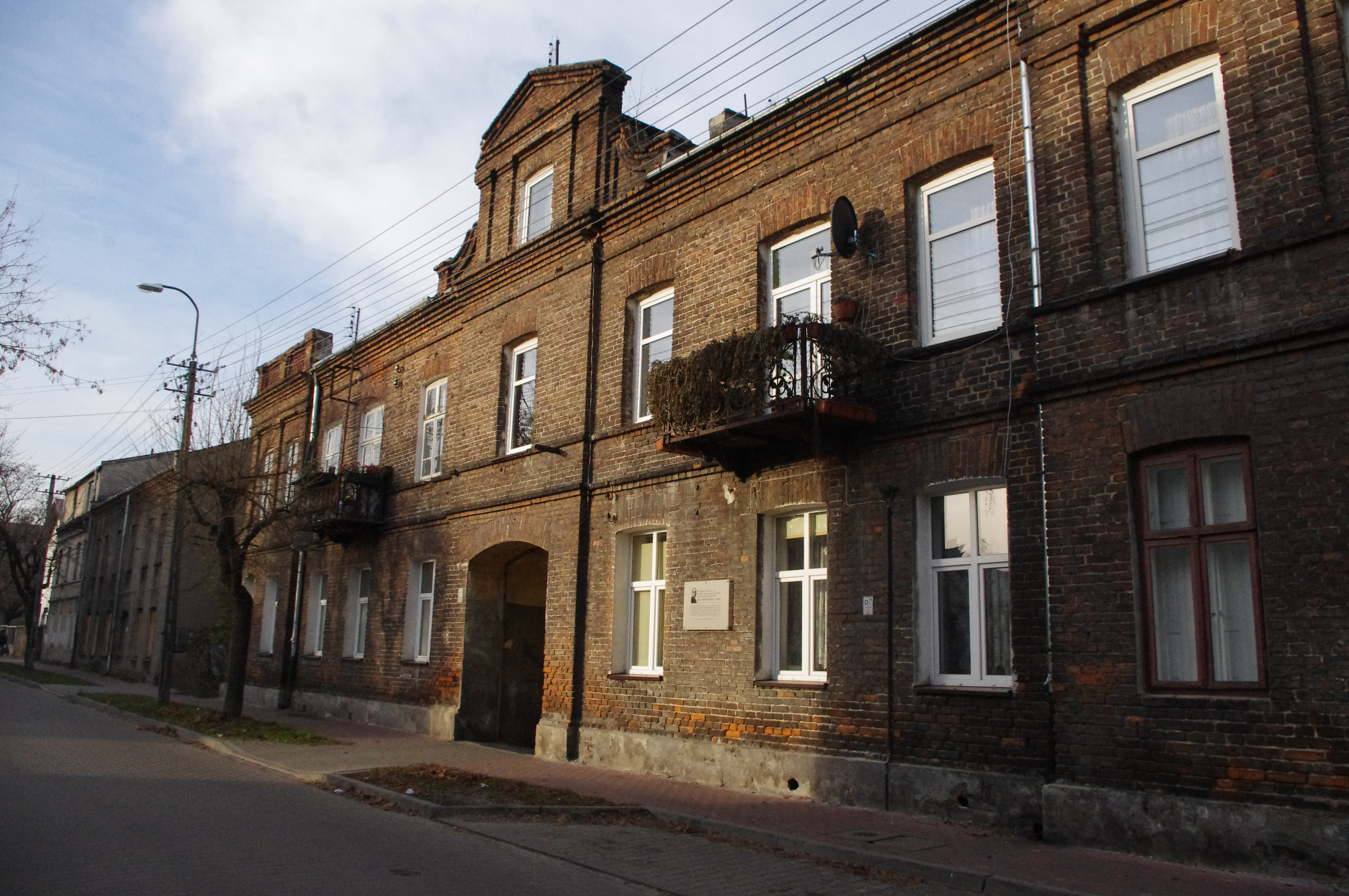
Childhood home of Polish poet Jan Lechoń

- Leszek Cichy (born 1951), mountaineer and high-altitude climber
- Jacek Gmoch (born 1939), footballer and football manager
- Ałbena Grabowska (born 1971), writer, neurologist
- Bronisław Komorowski (born 1952), former President of Poland, spent part of his childhood in Pruszków
- Jan Lechoń (1899–1956), poet, spent part of his childhood in Pruszków
- Radosław Majewski (born 1986), footballer
- Konrad Morawski (1913–1985), television and theatre actor
