= Warszawa Śródmieście station =

Warszawa Śródmieście station may be a reference to one of two stations in Warsaw, Poland:

- Warszawa Śródmieście PKP station
- Warszawa Śródmieście WKD station
