= Polesie railway station =

Commuter railway station in Milanówek, Poland

Coordinates: 52.1218°N 20.6972°E

Polesie
- Station in January 2014

General information
- Location: Milanówek, Masovian Voivodeship; Poland
- System: Commuter rail
- Operator: Warsaw Commuter Railway
- Line: Podkowa Leśna Główna–Milanówek Grudów
- Platforms: 1
- Tracks: 1

Other information
- Fare zone: 3
- Website: Polesie

History
- Opened: 30 September 1936
- Former names: Turczynek (1936–1952)
Location
- Location within Poland

Polesie is a railway station of the Warsaw Commuter Railway (WKD) located in the town of Milanówek, within central Poland.

== History ==
The station opened on 30 September 1936 as Turczynek. It was renamed to Polesie in 1952.

== Train services ==
Train services are operated by the Warsaw Commuter Railway; the station is in fare zone 3. On weekdays, services operate every 40 minutes during peak hours and every 60 minutes during off-peak hours, weekends, and public holidays.

Preceding station	Warsaw Commuter Railway	Following station
Terminus	WKD	Podkowa Leśna Zachodnia towards Warszawa Śródmieście WKD
