= Warsaw Commuter Railway =

Commuter rail line in Warsaw, Poland

Warsaw Commuter Railway Warszawska Kolej Dojazdowa

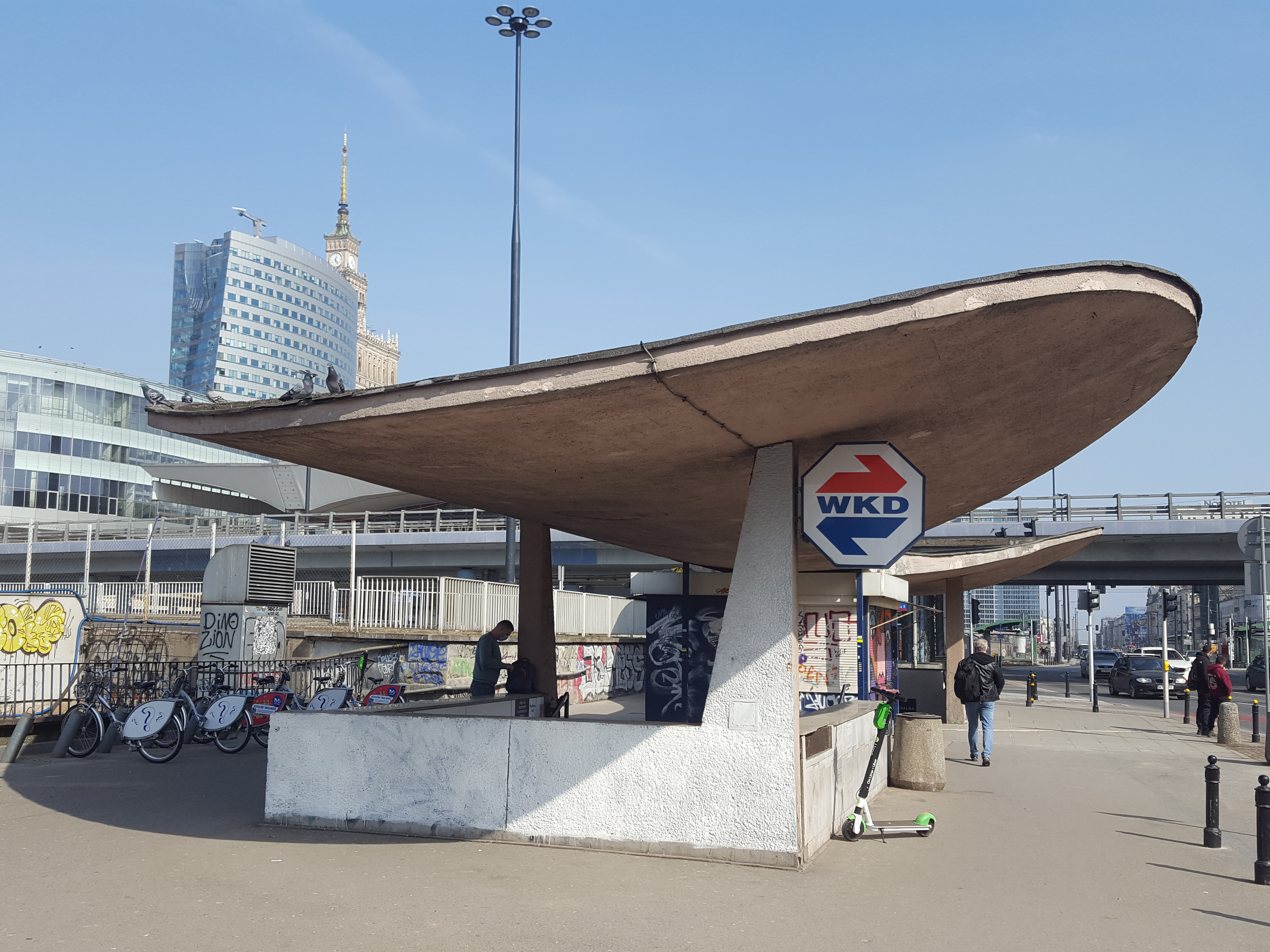
- Warszawa Śródmieście WKD, eastern entrance

Overview
- Locale: Warsaw metropolitan area
- Termini: Warszawa Śródmieście WKD; Milanówek Grudów, Grodzisk Mazowiecki Radońska
- Stations: 28
- Website: www.wkd.com.pl

Service
- Type: Commuter rail
- Depot: Grodzisk Mazowiecki
- Rolling stock: Class EN97; Class EN100
- Ridership: 5,246,218 (2024)

History
- Opened: 11 December 1927; 98 years ago
- Last extension: 30 September 1936; 90 years ago

Technical
- Line length: 35.5 km (22.1 mi)
- Num of tracks: 2, except 1 Podkowa Leśna Zachodnia–Milanówek Grudów
- Track gauge: 1,435 mm (4 ft 8 1/2 in) standard gauge
- Electrification: 3 kV DC, OLE
- Operating speed: 80 km/h (50 mph) maximum

The Warsaw Commuter Railway (Polish: Warszawska Kolej Dojazdowa; WKD) is a light commuter railway serving Warsaw's metropolitan area in Poland. It is made up of two railway lines, stretching from Warszawa Śródmieście WKD to Grodzisk Mazowiecki Radońska with a short spur to Milanówek Grudów. The entire system is fully electrified with 3 kV DC overhead wires.

== History ==
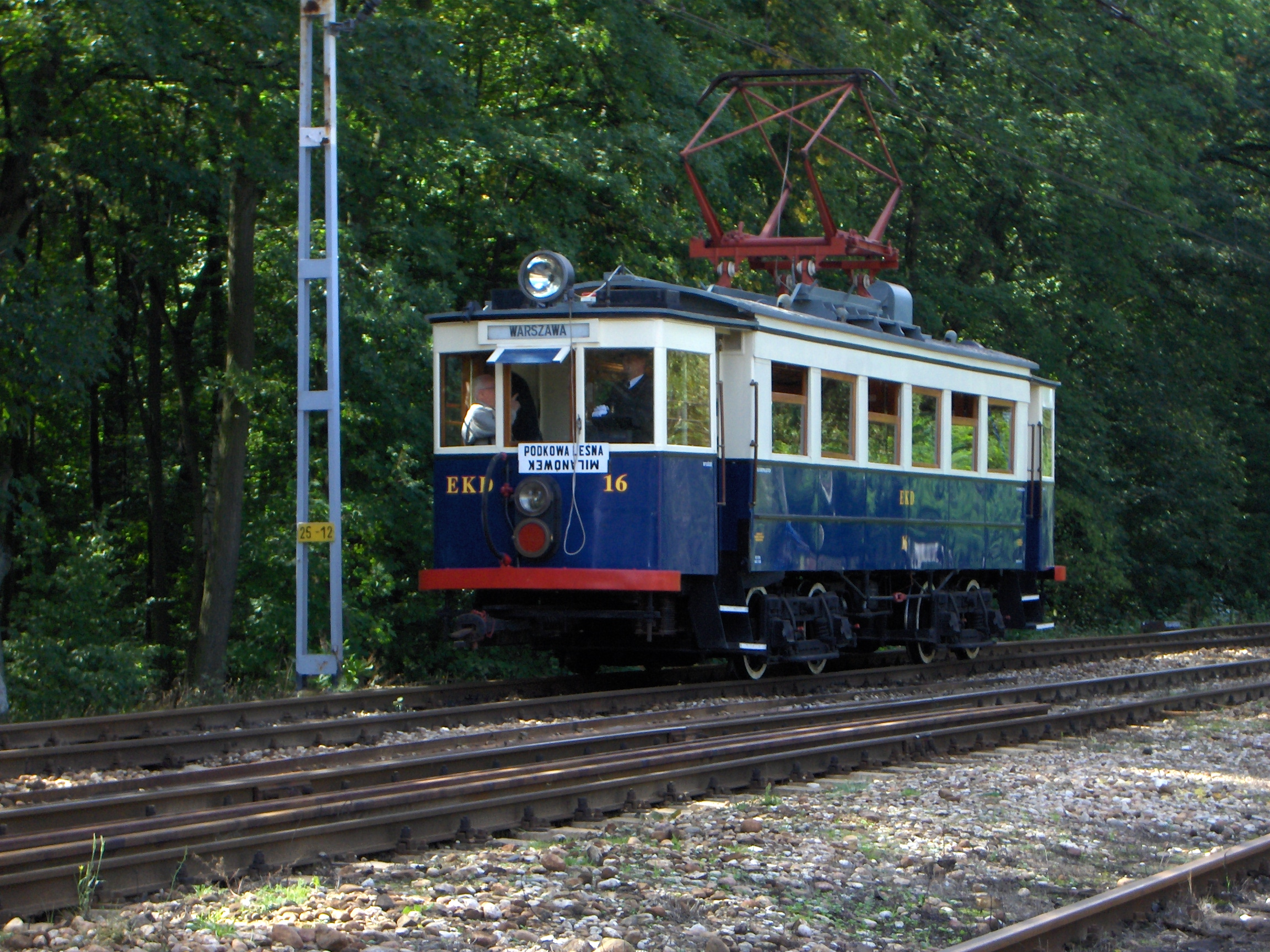
The class EN80 was the railway's first train; EN80-016 is the only unit preserved (pictured in 2006)

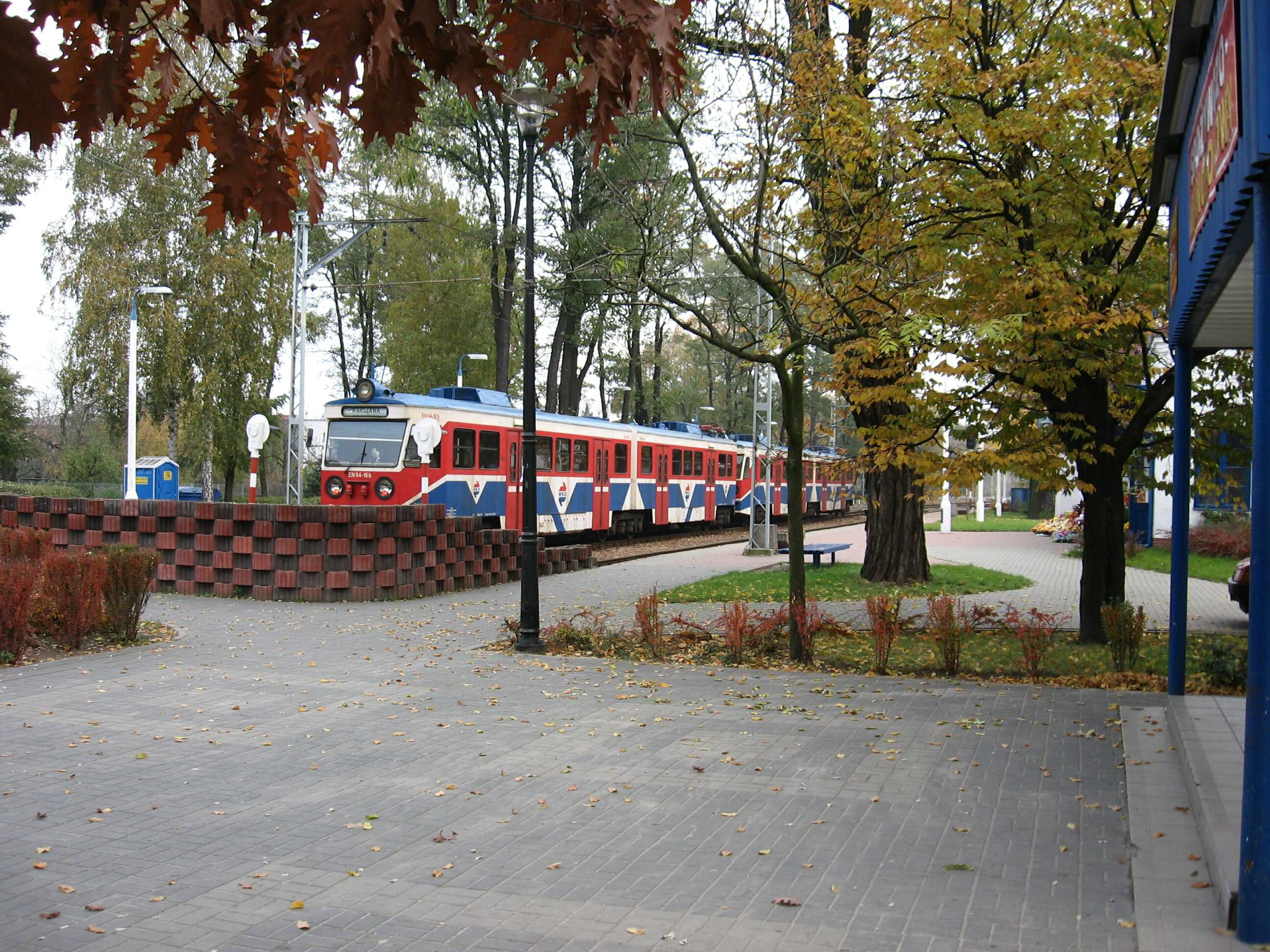
Class EN94 at Grodzisk Mazowiecki Radońska in November 2007

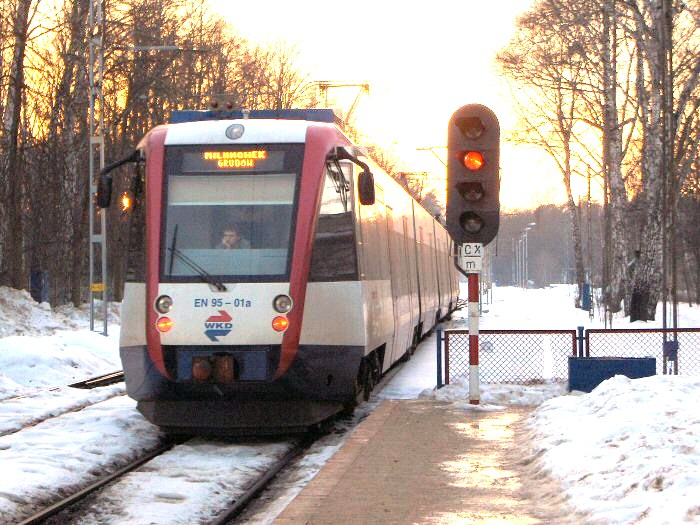
Class EN95 in February 2006

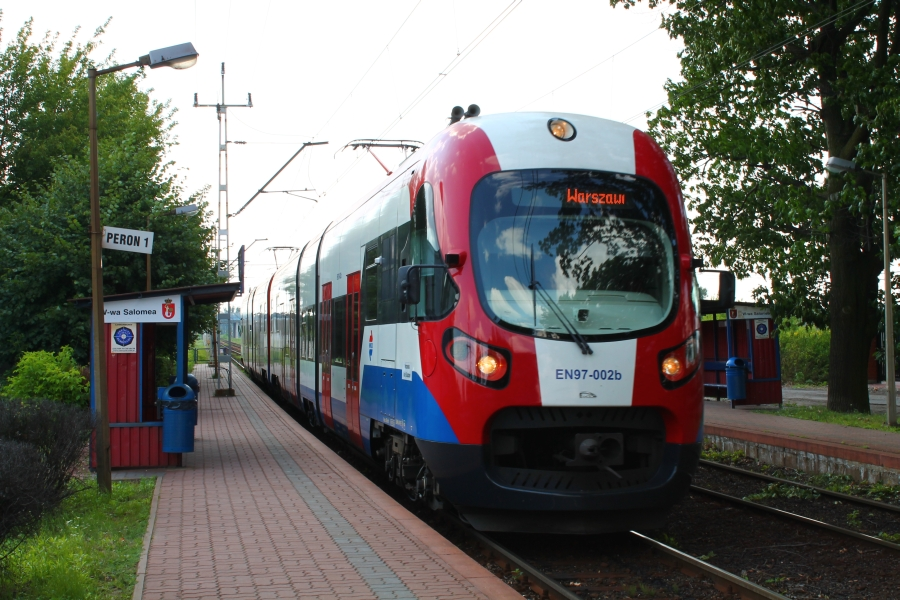
Class EN97 at Warszawa Salomea in July 2014

The line was constructed and operated under the original name Elektryczne Koleje Dojazdowe (Electric Commuter Rail) by a privately owned electrical power industry consortium Siła i Światło (Power and Light) established with the participation of British capital shortly after Poland regained independence after World War I in 1918. The consortium sought to build an electric railway in order to accelerate economic development and increase the demand for its services. To achieve this goal it created in 1922 the company Elektryczne Koleje Dojazdowe S.A., owned in 40% by Siła i Światło, 25% by one of the financing banks and the remaining 35% held by small shareholders.

In 1924 the company received a concession from the ministry of transport to build a private railway from Warsaw through Grodzisk Mazowiecki to Żyrardów, under the condition that it would be run at least 2 kilometers from the existing line of the former Warsaw-Vienna Railway owned by the Polish State Railways (PKP). The work began in Komorów and proceeded simultaneously in two directions. In 1927 a 32.4 kilometres long standard gauge line electrified at 650 V DC with overhead wire was opened, linking Grodzisk Mazowiecki with the center of Warsaw. The line was connected with a 3 kilometre long non-electrified technical line with the national rail system in Komorów, 24 kilometres of the line between Podkowa Leśna and Warsaw consisted of double track, the four kilometres long segment of the line leading to the railway's final station in Warsaw at Marszałkowska Street was street-running. The railway operated 20 four-axle electric railcars produced by the English Electric Company at Preston, capable of travelling at a speed of up to 70 km/h, along with 20 unpowered passenger cars.

In 1932 the line was extended in Grodzisk Mazowiecki to reach Grodzisk Mazowiecki PKP station and a short branch line was built in Włochy just outside Warsaw, likewise linking with the Włochy PKP station. In 1936 a branch line was opened from Podkowa Leśna to Milanówek PKP station. Before the outbreak of World War II work was initiated on the construction of a second line from Komorów to Nadarzyn and Mszczonów.

The Elektryczna Kolej Dojazowa (EKD) in 1939 carried 4000 passengers a day and ran trains every 10 minutes during rush hours. Its core business had not yet reached profitability, however the company made money reselling real estate which gained in value significantly due to the railway.

During World War II the railway remained operational during most of the German occupation albeit only on part of the line. In 1947 the company was nationalised by the Soviet installed communist government and in 1951 placed under the administration of the Polish State Railways and renamed to Warszawska Kolej Dojazdowa (Warsaw Commuter Rail), however the line retains a narrower loading gauge and (until 2016) its specific electrification system while the national rail network uses 3 kV DC. During the 1960s the line was gradually trimmed at its ends and in Warsaw moved to newly built tracks in a cutting of the western part of the Warsaw Cross-City Line. In 1972 the almost half-a-century-old English Electric railcars were replaced by new PKP class EN94 EMUs produced by Pafawag in Wrocław designed especially for the line.

In 2001 with the restructuring of the Polish State Railways a separate company called PKP Warszawska Kolej Dojazdowa Sp. z o.o. was created within the PKP Group and in 2007 taken over by a consortium formed by the Masovian Voivodeship and the municipalities through which the line runs, dropping the letters PKP from its name.

Several proposals have been made for the modernisation of line, proposing alternately either switching the line to standard tram rolling stock and eventually integrating with the Warsaw Tramway system or rebuilding the line to standard rail loading gauge and converting to a 3 kV electrification system in order to integrate it with the national rail network. Additionally, plans have been prepared for moving the final station of the line in Warsaw to Rondo Dmowskiego at Marszałkowska Street in order to facilitate easier transfers to the Centrum station on line M1 of the Warsaw Metro and to build the second, long-planned line between Komorów and Nadarzyn, however as of 2022 no funds have been allocated towards any of those.

In 2004 Warszawska Kolej Dojazdowa received a single prototype of a new EMU designated PKP class EN95 built by PESA in Bydgoszcz which remains in service today, however no further units of this type have been ordered. Instead in 2010, the company ordered also from PESA 14 EMUs class EN97 (a.k.a. 33WE) of a completely new design, requiring in the specification the possibility to convert them to the voltage used on the national rail network, these were delivered in 2012. In 2016 the overhead voltage has been switched from 600 to 3,000 V and all EN97s were converted to a new voltage. In the same year Warszawska Kolej Dojazdowa received 6 EMUs class EN100 (a.k.a. 39WE), manufactured by Newag (ordered in 2014).

In 2020 Warszawska Kolej Dojazdowa started preparations to double-track the 7.5-km long Podkowa Leśna Główna – Grodzisk Mazowiecki Radońska section. This section was planned from the outset to be double track but for financial reasons only one track was built at the time. The works were completed in mid-2024.

== Route ==
Starting as double-track from the Warszawa Śródmieście WKD terminus adjacent to the mainline Warszawa Centralna railway station, the line initially runs to the west alongside Warsaw's main east–west railway line before turning to the south-west on its own right of way. The length of the Warszawa Śródmieście WKD to Grodzisk Mazowiecki Radońska line is 33 km, and of the Milanówek branch 3 km.

Main section:

- Warszawa Śródmieście WKD
- Warszawa Ochota
- Warszawa Zachodnia
- Warszawa Reduta Ordona
- Warszawa Aleje Jerozolimskie
- Warszawa Raków
- Warszawa Salomea
- Opacz
- Michałowice
- Reguły
- Malichy
- Tworki
- Pruszków WKD
- Komorów
- Nowa Wieś Warszawska
- Kanie Helenowskie
- Otrębusy
- Podkowa Leśna Wschodnia
- Podkowa Leśna Główna
- Podkowa Leśna Zachodnia
- Kazimierówka
- Brzózki
- Grodzisk Mazowiecki Okrężna
- Grodzisk Mazowiecki Piaskowa
- Grodzisk Mazowiecki Jordanowice
- Grodzisk Mazowiecki Radońska

Milanówek branch:

- Polesie
- Milanówek Grudów

There is a single-track non-electrified link between the Komorów station and the PKP rail network (Pruszków station), carrying no scheduled traffic.

== Operation ==
The company's headquarters and the main technical depot is Grodzisk Mazowiecki Depot. The WKD is a standard gauge line and is electrified at 3 kV DC. Until May 2016, the railway line used 600 V DC as the only public railway line in Poland.

=== Rolling stock ===
Current fleet
Class	Image	Type	Max speed km/h	Units built	Year built	Notes
EN97		Electric multiple unit	80	14	2011	
EN100		Electric multiple unit	100	6	2016	
Retired fleet
EN80		Electric motor coach	85	52	1927	Retired in 1972.
EN94 101N		Electric multiple unit	80	1	1969	Prototype Pafawag 101N. Retired in 1989.
EN94		Electric multiple unit	80	39	1972	Series-produced type Pafawag 101Na. Retired in 2016.
EN95		Electric multiple unit	90	1	2004	Prototype unit. Out of service since June 2019 due to technical faults. Approval for passenger operation expired in March 2020. In August 2025, it was announced that the train would not be repaired (which was required for it to re-enter service); it was subsequently stored at the Tadeusz Gawroński EKD/WKD Tradition Chamber in Grodzisk Mazowiecki.

The company also owns a small diesel shunter, obtained second hand from PKP.

On the main line, trains operate every 15 minutes at peak hours and every 30 minutes off-peak, with a service gap between midnight and 05:00. For most of the day, one train an hour runs through to Milanówek Grudów, with most of the other trains running through to Grodzisk Mazowiecki Radońska. All trains stop at all stations on their route, and a journey from Warszawa Śródmieście WKD to Grodzisk Mazowiecki Radońska takes just under one hour.

WKD accepts day tickets and transit passes issued by Warsaw's Public Transport Authority between Warszawa Śródmieście WKD and Opacz.

== See also ==
- Rapid Urban Railway (Warsaw), heavy commuter railway in the same city
- Masovian Railways, mainline operator in the same voivodeship
