= Milanówek Grudów railway station =

Commuter railway station in Milanówek, Poland

Milanówek Grudów
- Platform in April 2023

General information
- Location: Milanówek, Masovian Voivodeship; Poland
- Coordinates: 52°07′20″N 20°40′57″E
- System: Commuter rail
- Operator: Warsaw Commuter Railway
- Line: Podkowa Leśna Główna–Milanówek Grudów
- Platforms: 1
- Tracks: 1

Other information
- Fare zone: 3
- Website: Milanówek Grudów

History
- Opened: 30 September 1936
- Former names: Milanówek Grudów (1936–1945); Grudów (1945–1946)
Location
- Location within Poland

Milanówek Grudów is a railway station of the Warsaw Commuter Railway (WKD) located in the town of Milanówek, within central Poland. It is the western terminus of the Podkowa Leśna Główna–Milanówek Grudów railway, one of the two branches of WKD.

== History ==
The station opened on 30 September 1936. It was briefly called Grudów in 1945–1946. Until 1973, Milanówek Grudów was a through station as the line ran to Milanówek WKD. It now subsequently now serves as the termini.

== Train services ==
Train services are operated by the Warsaw Commuter Railway; the station is in fare zone 3. On weekdays, services operate every 40 minutes during peak hours and every 60 minutes during off-peak hours, weekends, and public holidays.

Preceding station	Warsaw Commuter Railway	Following station
Terminus	WKD	Polesie towards Warszawa Śródmieście WKD
