= Grodzisk Mazowiecki Radońska railway station =

Railway station in Poland

Grodzisk Mazowiecki Radońska
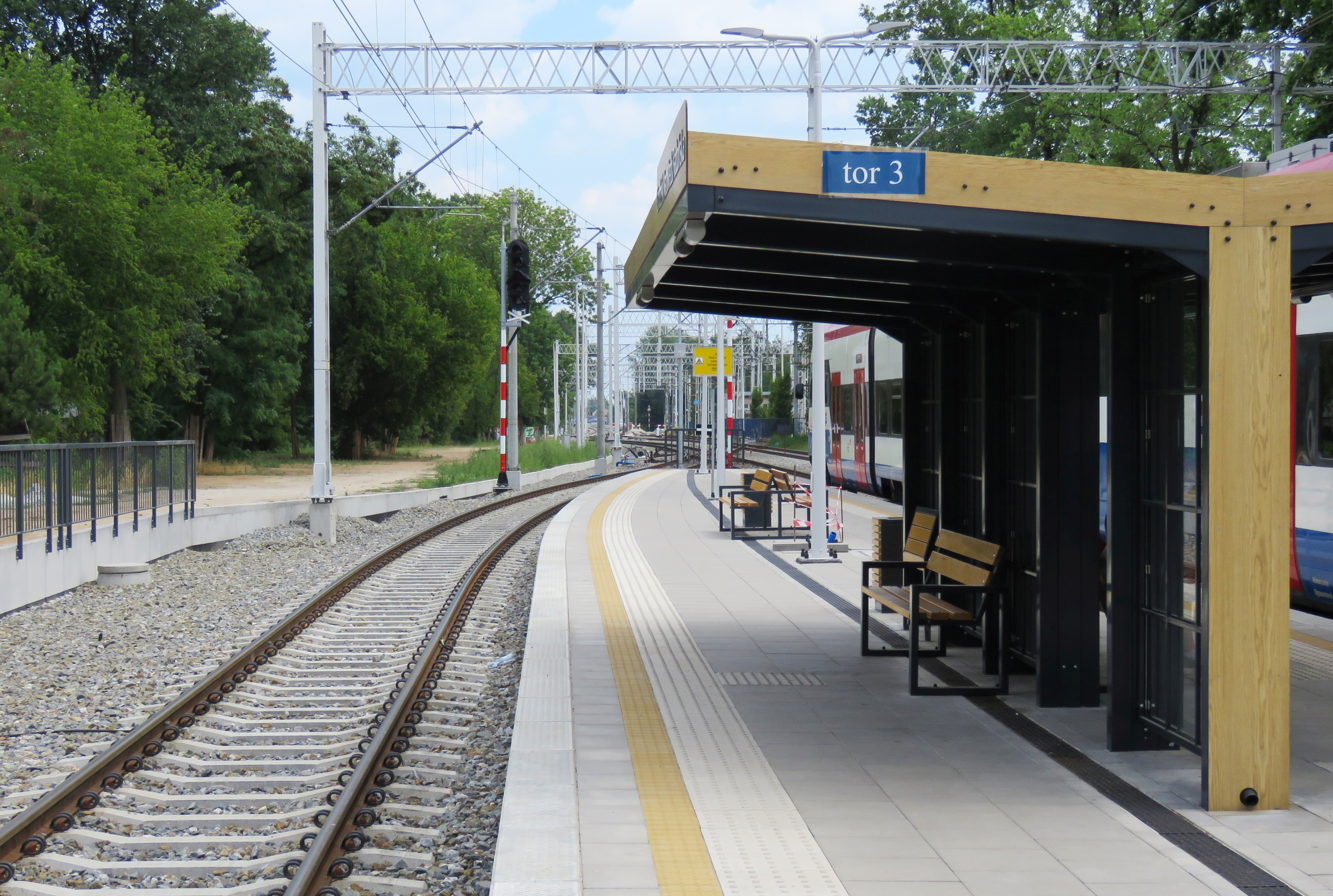
- Station building

General information
- Location: Grodzisk Mazowiecki; Poland
- Coordinates: 52°06′02″N 20°37′43″E
- Line: PKP rail line 47 (Warszawa Śródmieście WKD – Grodzisk Mazowiecki Radońska)
- Platforms: 2

History
- Opened: 1927
- Former names: Grodzisk Mazowiecki Wozownia EKD
Location

Grodzisk Mazowiecki Radońska is a station of the Warsaw Commuter Railway located at Radońska in Grodzisk Mazowiecki, Poland.

== Background ==
In 2018, the station served 5–6 thousand passengers per day, which gave it, together with the station Gdańsk Politechnika, 52nd place for most used station in the country.

Grodzisk Mazowiecki Radońska is the terminus of the line. In the past, there were also stops behind the station: Grodzisk Mazowiecki Radońska/Sienkiewicza, Grodzisk Mazowiecki pl. Wolności and Grodzisk Mazowiecki 11 November. The line ended at the station Grodzisk Mazowiecki EKD, located next to the station PKP. This section closed in 1966.

In the vicinity of the station, there is the seat of the WKD company (ul. Batorego 23), a depot for rolling stock and Chamber of Tradition EKD/WKD.

Preceding station	Warsaw Commuter Railway	Following station
Terminus	WKD	Grodzisk Mazowiecki Jordanowice towards Warszawa Śródmieście WKD

== Station description ==
=== Platforms ===
Until the start of reconstruction in May 2022, the station consisted of two side platforms with one platform edge each. On 20 February 2023, the reconstructed station was commissioned, consisting of one side platform and one island platform, and the total number of platform edges increased to three.

=== Ticket office ===
At the first platform there is a station building.

Equipment:

- ticket office
- small waiting room
