= Warszawa Śródmieście WKD railway station =

Railway station in Warsaw, Poland

Coordinates: 52°13′40″N 21°00′04″E

Warszawa Śródmieście WKD
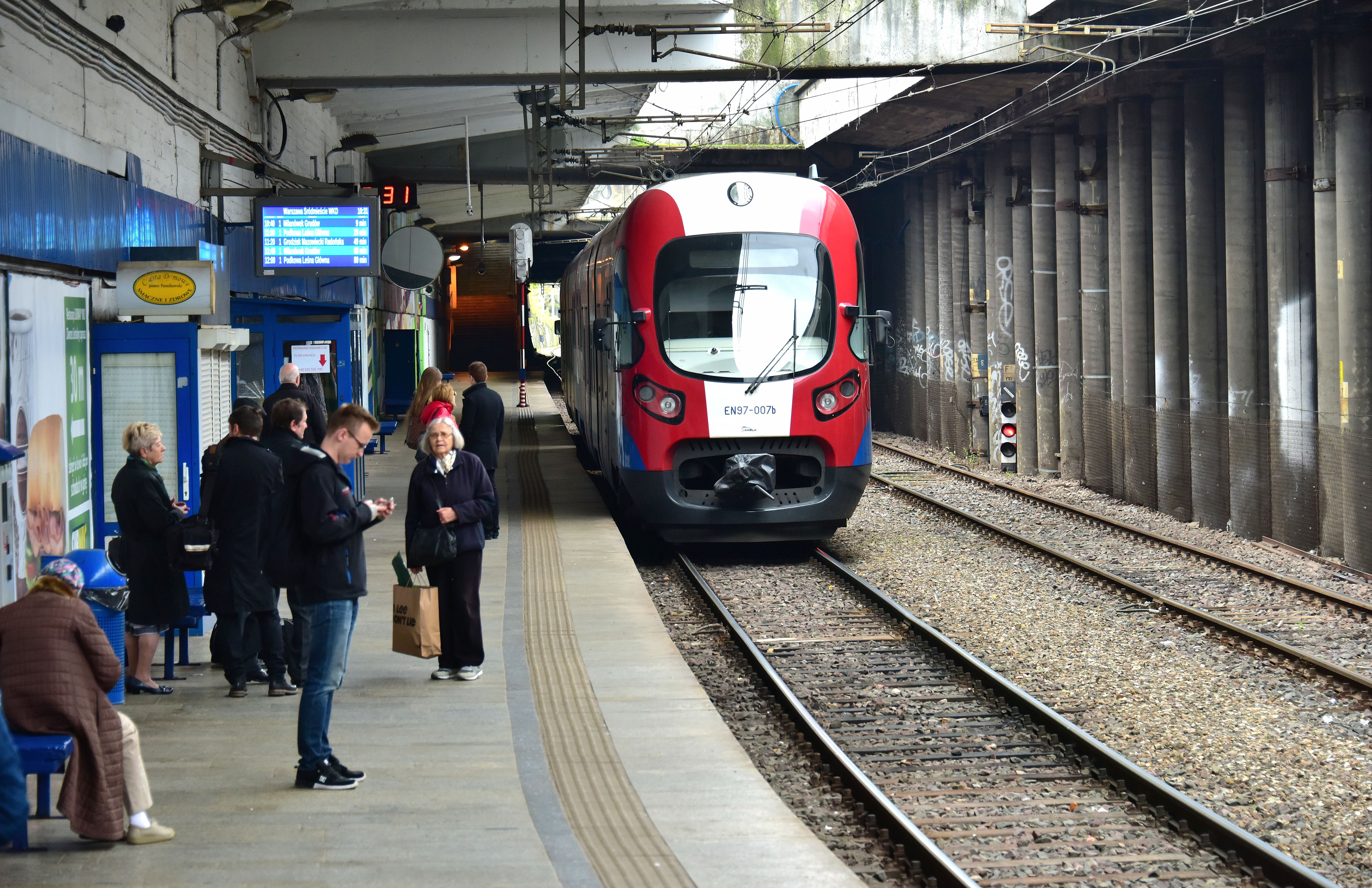

General information
- System: Warsaw Commuter Railway terminus
- Platforms: One side platform
- Tracks: 2

Other information
- Website: Station website

Services
Preceding station	Warsaw Commuter Railway	Following station
Warszawa Ochota towards Grodzisk Mazowiecki Radońska or Milanówek Grudów	WKD	Terminus
Route map
Location

Warszawa Śródmieście WKD (Polish pronunciation: [ɕrudˈmjɛɕt͡ɕɛ]) is the city terminus of the Warsaw Commuter Railway (WKD) suburban light rail line in Warsaw. It is situated in Aleje Jerozolimskie to the south-west of Warszawa Centralna railway station. The station was opened on 8 December 1963.

The station platform is located below the ground level to the south of the approach tracks to Warszawa Centralna, which can be seen from the platform. The station has an unusual layout and method of operation, with a single long platform alongside the southern (city-bound) track. Inbound trains stop at the west end of the platform to unload passengers, before pulling forward to the east end to allow boarding. Once trains are ready to depart, they do so via a mid-platform cross-over onto the northern track.

The station has no above ground buildings, save for concrete shelters offering some weather protection to the staircases linking the platform to the street. Alternative access is provided via an underground shopping mall, which connects the station to Warszawa Centralna and the street-level tram stops.

Warszawa Śródmieście WKD station should not be confused with its near namesake Warszawa Śródmieście PKP station, which is a Polskie Koleje Państwowe (Polish State Railway) suburban station situated to the east of Warszawa Centralna.
