= Dariusz =

Dariusz is a male given name, predominantly in Polish. Etymologically, it derives from the Proto-Slavic "dar" gift, and signifies the giver/gift giver or possessors as well as "goods", and Persian name Dariush, meaning "he possesses" or "good".

== Given name ==
=== A ===
- Dariusz Adamczuk (born 1969), Polish footballer
- Dariusz Adamczyk (born 1966), Polish-German historian
- Dariusz Adamus (born 1957), Polish javelin thrower

=== B ===
- Dariusz Baliszewski (1946–2020), Polish historian
- Dariusz Banasik (born 1973), Polish football manager
- Dariusz Baranowski (born 1972), Polish cyclist
- Dariusz Batek (born 1986), Polish cyclist
- Dariusz Bayer (born 1964), Polish footballer
- Dariusz Białkowski (born 1970), Polish canoeist
- Dariusz Biczysko (born 1962), Polish high jumper
- Dariusz Bladek (born 1994), Canadian football player
- Dariusz Brytan (born 1967), Polish footballer
- Dariusz Brzozowski (born 1980), Polish drummer
- Dariusz Bugajski (born 1970), Polish naval officer

=== C ===
- Dariusz Czykier (born 1966), Polish footballer

=== D ===
- Dariusz Doliński (born 1959), Polish psychologist
- Dariusz Drągowski (born 1970), Polish footballer
- Dariusz Drelich (born 1967), Polish businessman
- Dariusz Dudek (born 1975), Polish footballer
- Dariusz Dudka (born 1983), Polish footballer
- Dariusz Dziekanowski (born 1962), Polish footballer
- Dariusz Dźwigała (born 1969), Polish footballer

=== F ===
- Dariusz Formella (born 1995), Polish footballer
- Dariusz Fornalak (born 1965), Polish footballer

=== G ===
- Dariusz Gajewski (born 1964), Polish film director
- Dariusz Garbocz (born 1971), Polish ice hockey player
- Dariusz Gawin (born 1964), Polish historian
- Dariusz Gęsior (born 1969), Polish footballer
- Dariusz Gilman (born 1973), Polish-American sabre fencer
- Dariusz Gładyś (born 1969), Polish footballer
- Dariusz Gnatowski (1961–2020), Polish actor
- Dariusz Góral (born 1991), Polish footballer
- Dariusz Goździak (born 1962), Polish pentathlete
- Dariusz Grabowski (born 1950), Polish politician
- Dariusz Grzesik (born 1966), Polish footballer
- Dariusz Grzywiński (born 1969), Polish wrestler

=== J ===
- Dariusz Jabłoński (disambiguation), multiple people
- Dariusz Jackiewicz (born 1973), Polish footballer
- Dariusz Jarecki (born 1981), Polish footballer
- Dariusz Jemielniak (born 1975), Polish professor
- Dariusz Joński (born 1979), Polish politician

=== K ===
- Dariusz Kałuża (born 1967), Polish clergyman
- Dariusz Karłowicz (born 1964), Polish philosopher
- Dariusz Antoni Kłeczek (born 1957), Polish politician
- Dariusz Kłus (born 1981), Polish footballer
- Dariusz Kofnyt (born 1964), Polish footballer
- Dariusz Kołodziej (born 1982), Polish footballer
- Dariusz Kołodziejczyk (born 1962), Polish historian
- Dariusz Koseła (born 1970), Polish footballer
- Dariusz Koszykowski (born 1972), Polish canoeist
- Dariusz Kotwica (born 1986), Polish serial killer
- Dariusz Kowaluk (born 1996), Polish sprinter
- Dariusz Kozłowski (born 1968), Polish biathlete
- Dariusz Kozubek (born 1975), Polish footballer
- Dariusz Kubicki (born 1963), Polish footballer
- Dariusz Kuć (born 1985), Polish sprinter
- Dariusz Kulesza (born 1987), Polish speed skater

=== L ===
- Dariusz Łatka (born 1978), Polish footballer
- Dariusz Libionka (born 1963), Polish historian
- Dariusz Lipiński (born 1955), Polish politician
- Dariusz Ludwig (born 1955), Polish decathlete

=== M ===
- Dariusz Małecki (born 1975), Polish field hockey player
- Dariusz Marciniak (footballer) (1966–2003), Polish footballer
- Dariusz Marciniak (darts player) (born 1982), Polish darts player
- Dariusz Marcinkowski (born 1975), Polish field hockey player
- Dariusz Marzec (born 1969), Polish footballer
- Dariusz Michalak (born 1966), Polish footballer
- Dariusz Michalczewski (born 1968), Polish boxer
- Dariusz Miłek (born 1968), Polish businessman
- Dariusz Mioduski (born 1964), Polish entrepreneur, lawyer and owner of Legia Warsaw

=== N ===
- Dariusz Nowak (born 1978), Polish rower
- Dariusz Nowakowski (born 1953), Polish judoka

=== O ===
- Dariusz Olszewski (born 1967), Polish politician
- Dariusz Osuch (born 1969), Polish weightlifter

=== P ===
- Dariusz Pasieka (born 1965), Polish footballer
- Dariusz Pawłoś (born 1969), Polish diplomat
- Dariusz Pawłowski (born 1999), Polish footballer
- Dariusz Pawlusiński (born 1977), Polish footballer
- Dariusz Pender (born 1974), Polish fencer
- Dariusz Pietrasiak (born 1980), Polish footballer
- Dariusz Piontkowski (born 1964), Polish politician
- Dariusz Płatek (born 1966), Polish ice hockey player
- Dariusz Podolski (born 1966), Polish footballer
- Dariusz Popiela (born 1985), Polish canoeist

=== R ===
- Dariusz Raczyński (born 1962), Polish footballer
- Dariusz Radosz (born 1986), Polish rower
- Dariusz Ratajczak (1962–2010), Polish historian
- Dariusz Rekosz (born 1970), Polish author
- Dariusz Romuzga (born 1971), Polish footballer
- Dariusz Rosati (born 1946), Polish professor
- Dariusz Rzeźniczek (born 1968), Polish footballer

=== S ===
- Dariusz Sęk (born 1986), Polish boxer
- Dariusz Seliga (born 1969), Polish politician
- Dariusz Sikora (born 1958), Polish ice hockey player
- Dariusz Skrzypczak (born 1967), Polish footballer
- Dariusz Śledź (born 1969), Polish motorcycle speedway rider
- Dariusz Slowik (born 1977), Polish-Canadian discus thrower
- Dariusz Snarski (born 1968), Polish boxer
- Dariusz Sośnicki (born 1969), Polish poet
- Dariusz Stachowiak (born 1984), Polish politician
- Dariusz Stalmach (born 2005), Polish footballer
- Dariusz Stanicki (born 1965), Polish volleyball player
- Dariusz Stola (born 1963), Polish historian
- Dariusz Świercz (born 1994), Polish-American chess player
- Dariusz Świerczewski (1936–2005), Polish basketball player
- Dariusz Szczerbal (born 1995), Polish footballer
- Dariusz Szlachetko (born 1961), Polish botanist
- Dariusz Szpakowski (born 1951), Polish sports commentator
- Dariusz Sztylka (born 1978), Polish footballer
- Dariusz Szubert (born 1970), Polish footballer
- Dariusz Szwed (born 1967), Polish politician

=== T ===
- Dariusz Trafas (born 1972), Polish javelin thrower
- Dariusz Trela (born 1989), Polish footballer

=== U ===
- Dariusz Ulanowski (born 1971), Polish footballer

=== W ===
- Dariusz Walęciak (born 1979), Polish footballer
- Dariusz Wdowczyk (born 1962), Polish footballer
- Dariusz Wódke (born 1957), Polish sabre fencer
- Dariusz Wojciechowski (born 1968), Polish cyclist
- Dariusz Wójtowicz (born 1965), Polish footballer
- Dariusz Wolny (disambiguation), multiple people
- Dariusz Wolski (born 1956), Polish cinematographer
- Dariusz Wosz (born 1969), German football coach
- Dariusz Wrzosek (born 1982), Polish canoeist
- Dariusz Wszoła (born 1978), Polish powerlifter

=== Z ===
- Dariusz Zakrzewski (born 1961), Polish cyclist
- Dariusz Zawadzki (born 1982), Polish footballer
- Dariusz Zelig (born 1957), Polish basketball player
- Dariusz Zgutczyński (born 1965), Polish footballer
- Dariusz Zielke (born 1960), Polish high jumper
- Dariusz Zjawiński (born 1986), Polish footballer
- Dariusz Żuraw (born 1972), Polish football manager

== See also ==
- Darius (given name), a disambiguation page for people with the given name of Darius
