= Cardinal point (disambiguation) =

A cardinal point is a one of the four main compass directions.

Cardinal point can also refer to:

- Cardinal point (optics), a set of special points in an optical system, which help in the analysis of its properties
- Cardinal Points, a student-run newspaper at Plattsburgh State University
