= Krzysztof Miszczak =

- Born: 24 July 1955 (age 71); Milanówek
- Education: LMU Munich; University of Warsaw
- Website: http://www.krzysztofmiszczak.pl/

Krzysztof Ryszard Miszczak (born 24 July 1955 in Milanówek) – Polish scientist, political scientist, Germanist, sinologist, professor extraordinarius, diplomat.

Director, member of the board of the Foundation for Polish-German Cooperation. Counsellor general to the prime minister at the chancellery of the prime minister. Chairman of the Foundation for Polish-German Reconciliation's council. Member of the Euro-Atlantic Association. In 2015, he was appointed a member of the scientific council of the Institute for Western Affairs. Lecturer at the European Law Faculty and Law Institute of the Warsaw School of Economics.

== Biography ==
Son of Ryszard Miszczak (of the Kucharski family) and Stanisława, daughter of Wacław and Cecylia Szewczyk.

Obtained the degree of Master of Political Sciences (1988), Doctor of Philosophy (cum laude) at LMU Munich (1993) for his dissertation entitled "Deklarationen und Realitäten. Die Beziehungen zwischen der Bundesrepublik Deutschland und der (Volks-) Republik Polen von der Unterzeichnung des Warschauer Vertrages bis zum Abkommen über gute Nachbarschaft und freundschaftliche Zusammenarbeit (1970-91)".

In 2013, he obtained the post-doctoral degree in social sciences (major in political sciences) at the Adam Mickiewicz University in Poznań for his dissertation entitled "Foreign policy, security policy and the policy of protecting the government coalition SPD-Sojusz 90/Green Party during the years 1998-2005" which was reviewed by professors Erhard Cziomer and Bogdan Koszel.

From 2014 professor extraordinarius at the European Law Faculty and Institute of Law of the Warsaw School of Economics.

He was a guest lecturer at LMU Munich, Marburg University, the University of Augsburg, the University of Hamburg, the University of Cologne, the University of Bonn, and the University of Jena.

From 1995, he has been associated with the Ministry of Foreign Affairs of the Republic of Poland. During the years 1996-2001 he was the Counsellor and Minister Plenipotentiary, Deputy Polish Ambassador in the Federal Republic of Germany, and Manager of the Cologne branch of the Polish Embassy. He was the Director of the Department of European Security Policy in the Ministry of Foreign Affairs of the Republic of Poland (2001–2002). From 2005 to 2007, he was the Director of the Department of Foreign Affairs in The Chancellery of the Prime Minister, Director of the Department of International Policy in The Chancellery of the Prime Minister, and then again the Director of the Department of Foreign Affairs in The Chancellery of the Prime Minister (he held this job during the term of Prime Minister Kazimierz Marcinkiewicz and Prime Minister Jarosław Kaczyński). From 2002 to 2006, he was the director of the "European Funds" magazine. From February 2008 to November 2013, he was the Director of the Office of the Prime Minister's Plenipotentiary for International Dialogue (under Minister Władysław Bartoszewski).

During the years 2009-2013, he was the Chairman of the Polish-German Forum.

From December 2013, he has worked as director and member of the board of the Foundation for Polish-German Cooperation and Counsellor General to the Prime Minister at The Chancellery of the Prime Minister. At the same time from 2009 he has been the Chairman of the Foundation for Polish-German Reconciliation. Member of the Euro-Atlantic Association, from 2015 member of the scientific council of the Institute for Western Affairs in Poznań. From January 2015 member of the Programme Council "Economic and Political Thought of the Łazarski University".

== Selected publications ==
He has written 7 books and approximately 90 papers, primarily about the Common Foreign and Security Policy, the Common Security and Defence Policy, Polish-German relations, the Weimar Triangle, as well as the foreign policy of the People's Republic of China. His other works include, among other things:

- Europejska Polityka Bezpieczeństwa, Wyższa Szkoła Studiów Międzynarodowych w Łodzi, Łódź 2004, ISBN 83-88504-23-1 [European Security Policy, Łódź International Studies Academy, Łódź 2004, ISBN 83-88504-23-1],
- Polityka zagraniczna, bezpieczeństwa i obrony koalicji rządowej SPD-Sojusz 90/Zieloni w okresie 1998–2005, Warszawa 2012, ISBN 978-83-7151-087-8 [Foreign policy, security policy and the policy of protecting the government coalition SPD-Sojusz 90/Green Party during the years 1998–2005, Warsaw 2012, ISBN 978-83-7151-087-8],
- "Deklarationen und Realitäten". Die Beziehungen zwischen der Bundesrepublik Deutschland und der (Volks-) Republik Polen von der Unterzeichnung des Warschauer Vertrages bis zum Abkommen über gute Nachbarschaft und freundschaftliche Zusammenarbeit (1970–91), Munich 1993, ISBN 3-88073-479-8,
- Polska a Wspólna Polityka Bezpieczeństwa i Obrony Unii Europejskiej, (w:), J. M. Fiszer (red.) Dziesięć lat członkostwa Polski w Unii Europejskiej. Próba bilansu i nowe otwarcie. ISP PAN, Warszawa 2015, ISBN 978-83-64091-46-9 [Poland and Joint EU Security and Defence Policy, (published in:), J. M. Fiszer (ed.) Ten years of Polish membership in the European Union. An attempt at balancing and new opening. ISP PAN, Warsaw 2015, ISBN 978-83-64091-46-9],
- Traktatowe mechanizmy spójności polityki zagranicznej, bezpieczeństwa i obrony Unii Europejskiej, (w:) A. Nowak-Far (red.), Jednolitość i spójność prawa. Perspektywa Unii Europejskiej i Federacji Rosyjskiej, SGH, Warszawa 2014, ISBN 978-83-7378-747-6 [Treaty mechanisms of uniform EU foreign, security and defence policy, (published in:) A. Nowak-Far (ed.), Uniformity and consistency of law from the Perspective of the European Union and the Russian Federation, SGH, Warsaw 2014, ISBN 978-83-7378-747-6],
- Nowy wymiar odpowiedzialności Niemiec za bezpieczeństwo w Europie w XXI wieku. Polityka zagraniczna i polityka bezpieczeństwa koalicji rządzącej SPD – Sojusz’90/Zieloni, a niemieckie interesy narodowe (1998–2002), (w:) R. Tomaszewski (red.) „Współpraca wojskowa Polski i Niemiec w procesie umacniania bezpieczeństwa europejskiego", Wojskowa Akademia Techniczna, Warszawa 2002 [New dimension of Germany's responsibility for European security in the 21st century. Foreign policy and security policy of the government coalition SPD-Sojusz 90/Green Party and the German national interest (1998–2002), (published in:) R. Tomaszewski (ed.) "Military co-operation of Poland and Germany in the process of reinforcing European security", Military University of Technology in Warsaw, Warsaw 2002],
- Die deutsch-polnischen Beziehungen in Zeiten der Krise in Osteuropa, „Zeitschrift für Außen - und Sicherheitspolitik", September 2015,
- The Polish Security and Defence Policy, "European Security & Defence", September 2015,
- Niemiecka polityka zagraniczna w policentrycznym porządku międzynarodowym (w:) J. Osiński (red.) Polityka Publiczna w Polsce. Priorytety i Wyzwania, Szkoła Główna Handlowa w Warszawie, 2015 [German foreign policy in polycentric international order (published in:) J. Osiński (ed.) Public policy in Poland. Priorities and Challenges, Warsaw School of Economics, 2015],
- European Union as an actor in new multipolar, global security order, Institute of Political Studies of the Polish Academy of Sciences, 2014,
- Unia Europejska jako aktor nowego multilarnego porządku światowego bezpieczeństwa, Instytut Studiów Politycznych PAN, 2014 [European Union as an actor in new multipolar, global security order?, "European Security Studies", 4/2014,
- Chiny-Unia Europejska, Partnerzy globalnego bezpieczeństwa?, „Bezpieczeństwo Narodowe", Biuro Bezpieczeństwa Narodowego, listopad 2014 [China-European Union, Partners in global security?, "National Security", Office of National Security, November 2014],
- Polska a Wspólna Polityka Bezpieczeństwa i Obrony Unii Europejskiej, „Myśl Ekonomiczna i Polityczna" 3 (46) 2014 [Poland and joint EU security and defence policy, "Economic and Political Thought" 3 (46) 2014,
- Munich Security Conference. Transatlantic deficits. "Analyses of the Ministry of Foreign Affairs". Warsaw 2002],
- Monachijska Konferencja Bezpieczeństwa. Transatlantyckie deficyty. „Analizy Ministerstwa Spraw Zagranicznych". Warszawa 2002 [Future of the Weimar Triangle after Poland's accession to the European Union, "Central European Review", issue 37/2004],

== Decorations ==
In 2014 he was decorated with the "Warsaw Ghetto Uprising" medal for documenting the memory of and military effort of Poles and Jews on the fronts of the Second World War. The event was organised by Jewish Social and Cultural Association in Poland, the Association of Jewish Combatants and Victims of World War II, as well as the Museum of the History of Polish Jews where the decoration took place.

On 11 June 2014 the Hipolit Cegielski Association decorated him with the silver "Labor Omnia Vincit" medal for popularising organic work, for his contributions to organic work, and for his actions towards common weal. This medal has also been awarded to the former president of the Republic of Poland Bronisław Komorowski, cardinal Stanisław Dziwisz, and archbishop Józef Życiński.
