= Irina Mashinski =

Russian-born poet

- Ирина Викторовна Машинская
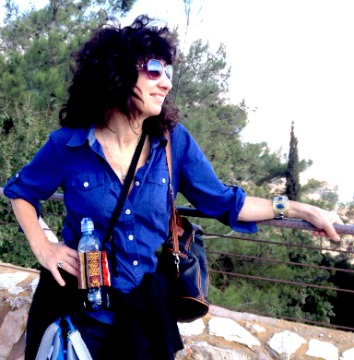
- Born: April 9, 1958 (age 68); Moscow, Soviet Union (now Russia)
- Citizenship: American
- Education: Moscow University
- Writing career
- Language: English, Russian
- Genres: Poetry, essays, prose
- Website: irinamashinski.com

Irina Mashinski (Russian: Ирина Викторовна Машинская, born April 9, 1958 in Moscow) is a Russian-American poet, essayist, editor, and translator. She is best known for her Russian-language poetry and prose, her editorial work, and her fusion book in English, The Naked World: A Tale with Verse.

== Life and work ==
Mashinski was born in Moscow to a Jewish family. Her maternal grandmother, Ophelia Vinogradova, was an actress at the First State Children’s Theater in Khar’kiv, Ukraine, in the early 1920s. Mashinski’s paternal grandfather was Alexander Mashinsky (Александр Васильевич Машинский), the experimental theatre scenic designer at Grigori Roshal’s theater in the early 1920s, and later a Moscow architect.

Mashinski graduated summa cum laude from Moscow University where she later obtained her Ph.D. in Paleoclimatology. Although she had been writing poetry since childhood, Mashinski never was a member of any poetry groups that were active in the 1970s and 1980s. During Perestroika, she founded “Bullfinch” (Russian: «Снегирь»), а children’s literary studio in Moscow. In 1991, she emigrated to the United States, where she taught high school mathematics, and later, Russian culture and history at New York University. In 2005, Mashinski founded her independent educational company, Cardinal Points Tutoring.

== The StoSvet/Cardinal Points Literary Project ==
In 2005, together with poet and writer Oleg Woolf, Mashinski founded the bilingual New York-based StoSvet literary project which included the Russian-language journal «Стороны света (2005–2019) and the English-language Cardinal Points (2010-2025; in 2016-2025 – the Journal of Brown University’s Slavic Studies Department). The project also included the Compass Translation Award (2011–2019) for the best translation of Russian poetry into English. Following Oleg Woolf’s death in 2011, Mashinski continued and expanded StoSvet, for which in 2015 she was shortlisted for the Russian Award. Between 2011 and 2022, she created and hosted several reading and dialogue series, including SLASH and Dialogues on Translation.

== Publications ==
Mashinski’s first collection, the bilingual chapbook Because we are here/Потому что мы здесь (1995), was unexpectedly published shortly upon her arrival in the US and was followed by thirteen books in Russian, English, and German. Her English-language writings have appeared in Poetry International, World Literature Today, Asymptote, Modern Poetry in Translation, etc. Mashinski’s work has been translated into several languages and has appeared in various anthologies and journals worldwide.

In 2020, she authored the Russian-language translation of the Emma Lazarus sonnet "The New Colossus", inscribed on the pedestal of the Statue of Liberty, for the multilingual international Emma Lazarus Project.

Mashinski is the co-editor, with Robert Chandler and Boris Dralyuk, of The Penguin Book of Russian Poetry (Penguin Classics, 2015) and co-translator of Lev Ozerov’s Portraits Without Frames (NYRB, 2018). Her English-language debut, The Naked World: A Tale with Verse, was released in 2022 and was widely lauded by critics. Her second book in English, Giornata (2022), was a poetry collection translated by Maria Bloshteyn and Boris Dralyuk. In 2024, the German translation of The Naked World, Die nackte Welt (in Maria Meinel’s translation) was released by Elif Verlag.

== Critical reception ==
In his Preface to The Naked World, Ilya Kaminsky writes: “This is a soul-making book, one that doesn't rest easy on the conventional narrative of one refugee's escape, but probes deeper into the music our days make, sometimes against our will. Brava!”

In Los Angeles Review of Books, Herb Randall says: “Mashinski seeks liberating oblivion in a space that neither cares about nor notices her presence. The “A-merica” of Mashinski’s experience, with the negating “A-,” is “neither this, not that, nor the other, but a trying of the otherness,” a laboratory of creative dissection and reassembly of the self. Mashinski’s book is a virtuosic gift that amply rewards repeated reading — and listening.”

Susan Blumberg-Kason remarks in World Literature Today: “Mashinski’s book is magical.”

Patrick Kurp (Anecdotal Evidence) writes:” Mashinski relaxes and luxuriates in her understanding of human nature – precisely what Soviet Communism sought to manipulate and ultimately destroy.<..>Mashinski’s work has the charm of a gifted child, one undefeated by experience and the crushing weight of history.”

Sharon Mesmer (On the Seawall) remarks that The Naked World “is a beautiful, harrowing, and perhaps cautionary primer in legacy tragedy and survival.

== Honors and awards ==
- 2025 The Andrei Bely Prize short list (prose)
- 2023 - Pushcart Prize nomination (Giornata)
- 2017 – Hawthornden Fellowship (UK)
- 2015 - The international Russian Award (for the StoSvet Project), finalist
- 2012 – The Joseph Brodsky/Stephen Spender Award (with Boris Dralyuk, 2012): the First Prize.
- 2003 - The First Prize in the First Voloshin Poetry Competition
- 2001 - The International Russian America award, First Prize (for Because We Are Here). Shared with Vladimir Druk.

Selected nominations for poetry in Russian: Russian Award (2017), Moscow Count (2017), Bunin Award (2004), Apollon Grigoriev award (2001).

== Bibliography ==
=== Prose. Essays. Hybrid ===
- Gorizont i peshchera. Izbrannye esse i proza (1995-2024) [The Horizon and the Cave. Selected essays and prose (1995-2024)]. Frankfurt/Main: Esterum Publishing, 2025.
- And I thought of Scott. [I ia podumala o Scotte]. In Russian. Moscow: Steklograf, 2025
- Die nackte Welt. [The Naked World]. In German. Tr. by Maria Meinel. Nettetal: Elif verlag, 2024.
- Book of Reflections. [Kniga otrazhenii]. In Russian. Ekaterinburg: Armchair Scientist/InVersia, 2021.
- The Naked Word. A Tale with Verse. Ashville: MadHat Press, 2022.

=== Poetry collections ===
- Geomorfologiia. Izbrannye stihotvorenia (1977-2022) [Geomorphology. Selected poems (1977-2022)]. Frankfurt/Main: Esterum Publishing, 2025
- Giornata. Poems. Translated into English by Maria Bloshteyn and Boris Dralyuk. Somerville: Červená Barva Press, 2022.
- Delaware [Delaver]. In Russian. Moscow: Book Review (ARGO-RISK), 2017.
- Ophelia and the Trowel [Ofelia I masterok]. In Russian. New York: Ailuros Publishing, 2013.
- Wolf [Volk]. Selected poems. In Russian. Moscow: NLO, 2009.
- Raznichinets First Snow and Other Poems [Raznochinets pervyi sneg I drugie stikhotvorenia]. In Russian. New York: StoSvet Press, 2009.
- The Wayfarer Is Dreaming That [Putniku Snitsia]. In Russian. Moscow: Project O.G.I.: 2004.
- Poems [Stikhotvorenia]. In Russian. Moscow: Classics of the 21st Century Publishing House, 2001.
- Simpler Times [Prostye Vremena]. In Russian. Tenafly: The Hermitage Publishers, 2000.
- After the Epigraph. [Posle Epigrafa]. In Russian. Slovo/Word: NYC, 1996.
- Because We Are Here. [Potomu Chto My Zdes', poems, in English and Russian] New York: Lunar Offensive Press, 1995.

=== As translator and editor ===
- Penguin Book of Russian Poetry. Edited by Robert Chandler, Boris Dralyuk, and Irina Mashinski. London: Penguin Classics, 2015.
- Lev Ozerov. Portraits without Frames. Translated by Maria Bloshteyn, Robert Chandler, Boris Dralyuk, and Irina Mashinski. New York: NYRB Classics, 2018.
- Craig Czury. Parallel Rivertime. In English and in Russian. Translated into Russian by Irina Mashinski. PETROPOL', St.Petersburg, Russia, 1999.
- Cardinal Points. The annual literary journal. Edited by Boris Dralyuk (managing editor), Irina Mashinski, and Robert Chandler. // Stosvet Literary Project. co-founder, editor-in chief (2011- )

=== Selected media (in English) ===
- The History of Literature Podcast. #501. April 6, 2023. The Naked World
- Dialogues on Translation. 1-8 (2022).
