= Andrzej Szmajke =

Polish psychologist, author and professor

Andrzej Jerzy Szmajke
- Born: October 21, 1953; Kraśnik, Poland
- Died: June 5, 2016; Wrocław, Poland
- Education: University of Wrocław
- Known for: Autoprezentacja, Psychologia społeczna
- Scientific career
- Fields: Psychology
- Workplaces: University of Wrocław, University of Opole
- Thesis: Samoutrudnianie jako sposób autoprezentacji

Andrzej Jerzy Szmajke (21 October 1953 – 5 June 2016) was a prominent Polish psychologist, author and professor of humanities (2008).

== Biography ==
Andrzej Szmajke was born in 1953 in Kraśnik, Poland. He began his studies at the University of Wrocław in 1972, graduating with a master's degree in psychology in 1977.

Professor Szmajke researched self-presentation, person perception, and specialized in personality and social psychology. His most significant work concerned the phenomena of self-handicapping, self-presentation, interpersonal attraction, egotism and multiple topics within evolutionary psychology. Since the 1990s, he was an academic teacher affiliated with the University of Wrocław, the University School of Physical Education in Wrocław, and the University of Opole. He served as the Director of the Institute of Psychology at the University of Opole from 2008 until his death. He published more than 90 articles and books, and advised tens of Polish psychological scientists.

== Selected works ==
- Samoutrudnianie. Dobre i złe strony rzucania kłód pod własne nogi (co-authored with Prof. Dariusz Doliński)
- Samoutrudnianie jako sposób autoprezentacji: Czy rzucanie kłód pod własne nogi jest skuteczna metodą wywierania korzystnego wrażenia na innych?, Institute of Psychology, Polish Academy of Sciences, Warsaw, 1997.
- Autoprezentacja: maski – pozy – miny, Ursa Publishing, Olsztyn, 1999.
