= Andrzej Przyłębski =

Polish historian

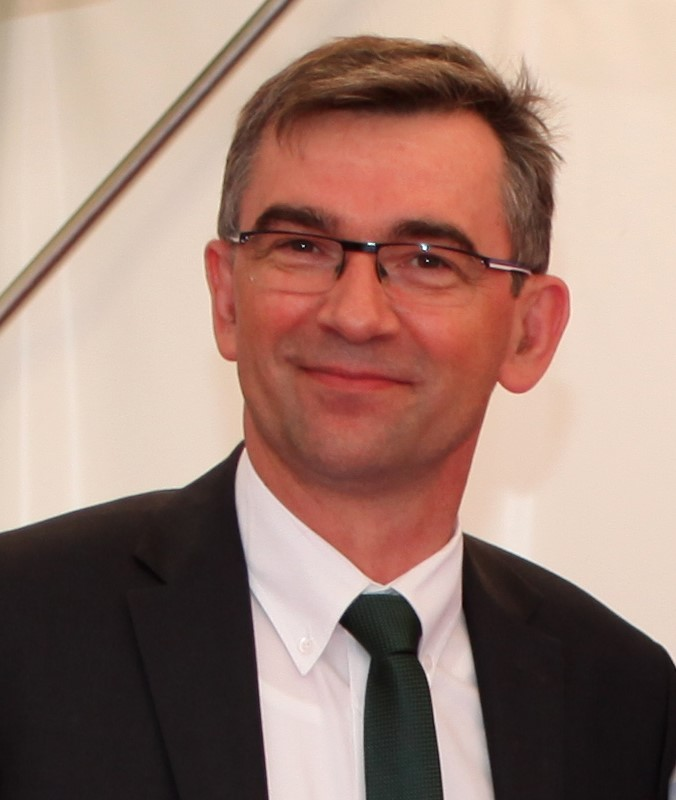
- Andrzej Przyłębski (2017)

Poland Ambassador to Germany
- In office 2016–2022
- President: Andrzej Duda
- Preceded by: Jerzy Margański
- Succeeded by: Dariusz Pawłoś

Personal details
- Born: 14 May 1958 (age 68) Chmielnik near Brzózki, Poland
- Spouse: Julia Przyłębska
- Children: 2 sons
- Education: Adam Mickiewicz University in Poznań
- Profession: Philosopher, university teacher
- Website: przylebski.com

Andrzej Przyłębski (born 14 May 1958) is a Polish philosopher and the author of six books on Neo-Kantianism and hermeneutics. He served as an informer Służba Bezpieczeństwa informer (under the codename TW Wolfgang) and as ambassador to Germany from 2016 to 2022

== Life ==
Przyłębski finished high school in Koło. He has been attending piano and accordion classes as well. In 1978, he became student of philosophy and social sciences at the Adam Mickiewicz University in Poznań (AMU). He graduated five years later (cum laude). In October 1983, he began scientific carrier at the AMU Institute of Philosophy. In 1987, he defended his Ph.D. thesis on Emil Lask's Logic of Philosophy.

Between 1978 and 1980 Przyłębski was TW Wolfgang, an informant of Służba Bezpieczeństwa, the communist security services.

Thanks to scholarship from the Alexander von Humboldt Foundation, from 1991 to 1993 Przyłębski spent in Heidelberg, preparing his post-doctoral thesis (habilitation) on the Baden School of Neo-Kantianism, with advice of Hans-Georg Gadamer and Reiner Wiehl. In 1993, he returned from Germany and became the deputy director of the AMU Philosophical Institute. Between 1996 and 2001, he worked as a scientific representative at the Polish diplomatic missions in Cologne and Berlin. Since 2002, Przyłębski was AMU associate professor. In 2009, he became Full Professor.

Przyłębski has been guest lecturer at the Universities of Cologne, Erlangen, Freiburg, Siegen, Szczecin. Since 2003, he has been a member of the Committee for Philosophical Sciences of the Polish Academy of Sciences, Warsaw. Since 2004, he has been vicepresident of the International Hegel-Society, Berlin. In 2003, he became the editor-in-chief of "Fenomenologia" scientific journal. He is a member of the Advisory Boards of three another journals: "Principia" (Kraków), "Przegląd Filozoficzny" (Warsaw) and "Analiza i Egzystencja" (Szczecin), as well as the Co-Editor of Hegel-Forschungen and Hegel-Jahrbücher. Przyłębski has also been a member of the Council of the Edith-Stein Research Centre in Poznań, and the President Lech Kaczynski Civic Academic Club in Poznań. He was the director of the AMU Florian Znaniecki Centre.

In July 2016, he was nominated Polish ambassador to Germany, and presented his letter of credence to the President Joachim Gauck. He ended his term on 31 January 2022.

He is married to Julia Przyłębska, President of the Constitutional Tribunal of Poland. They have two sons.

== Works ==
- Emila Laska logika filozofii [Emil Lask's Logic of Philosophy], Poznań: Wydawnictwo Naukowe UAM, 1990.
- W poszukiwaniu królestwa filozofii. Z dziejów neokantyzmu badeńskiego ["In the Search of the Realm of Philosophy"], Poznań: Wydawnictwo Naukowe UAM, 1994.
- Hermeneutyczny zwrot filozofii ["The Hermeneutical Turn of Philosophy"], Poznań: Wydawnictwo Naukowe UAM, 2004.
- Gadamer, Warszawa: Wiedza Powszechna, 2006.
- Etyka w świetle hermeneutyki, Warszawa: Oficyna Naukowa, 2010.
- Duch czy życie? Studia i szkice z filozofii niemieckiej, Poznań: WNS UAM, 2011.
- Dlaczego Polska jest wartością. Wprowadzenie do hermeneutycznej filozofii polityki, Wydawnictwo Poznańskie 2013 (second edition; Wydawnictwo Zysk i S-ka, Poznań 2018).
- Sense, Meaning and Understanding. Towards a Systematic Hermeneutical Philosophy, Wydydawnictwo LIT Verlag, Berlin 2013.
- Krytyka rozumu hermeneutycznego, Preliminaria, Kraków 2016.
- Ethics in the Light of Hermeneutical Philosophy, Wydawnictwo LIT Verlag, Berlin 2017.
- Hermeneutyka. Od sztuki interpretacji do teorii i filozofii rozumienia, Wydawnictwo Zysk i S-ka, Poznań 2019.

=== Translations ===
- Hans-Georg Gadamer, Dziedzictwo Europy, Warszawa: Wydawnictwo Spacja, 1991.
- R. H. Popkin/A. Stroll, Filozofia, Wyd. Zysk i S-ka, Poznań 1994 (with J. Karłowski and N. Leśniewski).
- Georg Simmel, Filozofia pieniądza (z filozoficznym komentarzem), Poznań: Wydawnictwo Humaniora, 1998.
- Ernst Troeltsch, Religia, kultura, filozofia (z krytycznym wprowadzeniem), Poznań: Wydawnictwo Poznańskie, 2006.
- Hans-Georg Gadamer, Wybór pism, [in:] A. Przyłębski, Gadamer, Wiedza Powszechna, Warszawa 2006, pp. 141–271.
- Hans-Georg Gadamer, O skrytości zdrowia, Poznań: Wydawnictwo Media Rodzina, 2011.
