= Kilometer 101 =

2022 essay collection by Maxim Osipov

- English version cover
- Editor: Boris Dralyuk
- Author: Maxim Osipov
- Translators: Boris Dralyuk; Alex Fleming; Nicolas Pasternak Slater
- Language: Russian
- Genres: Realistic fiction; Autobiography; Essays; Short stories
- Publisher: New York Review Books
- Publication date: October 11, 2022
- Pages: 296
- ISBN: 978-1-68137-686-8
- OCLC: 1292532454
- Dewey Decimal: 891.785
- LC Class: PG3492.87.S553 A1613 2022

Kilometer 101 is the second full-length collection to appear in English by Russian writer Maxim Osipov. The book was published by New York Review Books Classics on October 11, 2022, after the beginning of the Russian invasion of Ukraine. The book is split into two parts: "Luxemburg: Stories", realistic fictional short stories about life in Tarusa, Russia, and "Kilometer 101: Essays", autobiographical recounts of Osipov's experiences as a cardiologist and citizen in Tarusa. The essays are wide-ranging, exploring such themes as life as an outsider in provincial Russia, life abroad in America for foreigners, the challenge of maintaining Russian identity/history, and the politics of emigration. The collection was edited by Boris Dralyuk; it was translated from Russian by Dralyuk, Alex Fleming, and Nicolas Pasternak Slater.

== Background ==
Osipov was a cardiologist in Tarusa, a town nearly 101 kilometers (63 mi) outside of Moscow (hence the name of the collection). Osipov fled Russia shortly after the 2022 Russian invasion of Ukraine. Osipov's experiences in Tarusa influenced the stories, highlighting the miserable post-Soviet feeling that surrounded the town.

== Content and themes ==
The book opens with "Sventa", an essay that stands "in lieu of a foreword". The essay is written in second-person, as if you are Osipov and he is detailing his experiences to himself. Osipov visits a town in Lithuania that he and his family visited when he was a child, only to find that it is not quite the town he remembered, but still appreciated the new town's beauty.

Part 1, "Luxemburg: Stories", contains Osipov’s short fiction. The stories contain themes of emigration, fighting anti-Semitism, and mundane life in provincial Russia. The Financial Times described the stories as "... rather bleak ... Throughout the works in the collection, Osipov describes a world of alcoholism, violence, 'feeble-spiritedness' and apathy." For example, Matvey in "Pieces on a Plane" is escaping his life in Russia, his family history, and his own limitations; yet, despite his father's death, Matvey finds beauty in his layover in Rome by seeing a new city and experiencing another's life.

Part 2, "Kilometer 101: Essays", contains Osipov's autobiographical recounts of living in Tarusa, and the "anaesthetising greyness" of life in provincial Russia, as the Financial Times described it. In the opening essay, "My Native Land", Osipov lists the ailments facing the Russia people of "N—" (presumably Tarusa): general discontent and a sense of hopelessness, isolation from the community, alcoholism, familiarity with death, and a general "feeble spiritedness". Osipov does, however, offer a certain hopefulness and optimism. He finds meaning in his job, as well as appreciates the compassion of the people of "N—".

== Reception ==
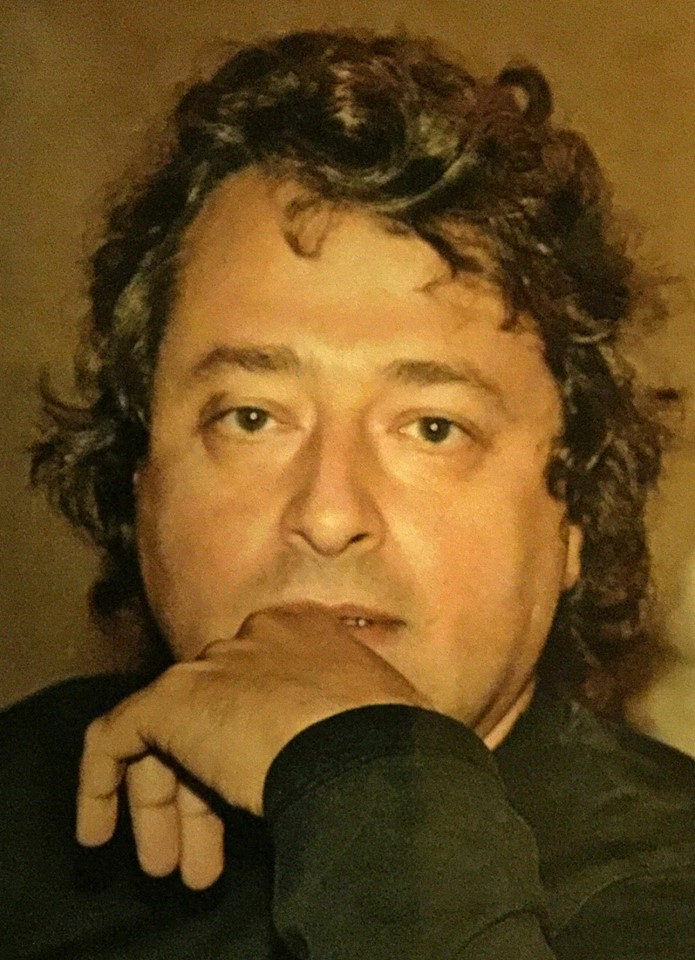
Osipov in 2014

In a review for Foreign Affairs, Maria Lipman reads the collection as existing at the crossroads of several "dilemmas"; of "a liberal facing an oppressive state", of an individual making "moral compromises" by staying in Russia and then emigrating. In a review for the Times Literary Supplement, Polly Jones writes that the book "demonstrates Osipov's preoccupation with the complex trajectories and emotions of migration and emigration," adding that such stories "are rarely presented in such straightforward, binary terms: many of [them] instead underscore the folly of imagining that life could be better anywhere else."
