= The Silver Bone =

2020 novel by Andrey Kurkov

The Silver Bone is a historical mystery novel by Ukrainian writer Andrey Kurkov. Originally published in Ukraine as Samson and Nadezhda, it was translated from Russian by Boris Dralyuk and published in English by MacLehose Press in 2024. It is the first novel in Kurkov's The Kyiv Mysteries trilogy. The English translation was longlisted for the 2024 International Booker Prize.

== Reception ==
The English translation received positive reviews. In The Washington Post, Linda Kinstler highlighted its surreal elements and its treatment of Ukrainian history. Publishers Weekly gave the novel a starred review and praised its attention to the details of World War I era life in Kyiv. The magazine later included it in its list of the best mystery books of 2024.
