= Grey Bees =

Novel by Andrey Kurkov

- Ukrainian Cover
- Author: Andrey Kurkov
- Original title: Серые пчелы
- Translator: Boris Dralyuk
- Language: Russian
- Publisher: MacLehose Press (UK)
- Publication date: 2018
- Publication place: Ukraine
- English publication date: May 14, 2020
- Media type: Print (Paperback)
- Pages: 304
- ISBN: 978-0857059345

Grey Bees (Ukrainian: Сірі бджоли; Russian: Серые пчёлы) is a 2018 novel by Ukrainian author Andrey Kurkov.

It was translated by Boris Dralyuk and published in English in 2020 (by MacLehose Press, UK) and in 2022 (by Deep Vellum, USA), winning the inaugural Gregg Barrios Book in Translation Prize from the National Book Critics Circle. It was also translated into French by Paul Lequesne as Les Abeilles grises, which won the 2022 Prix Médicis étranger.

This novel has "elements of both the fable and the epic", and it dramatises the conflict in Ukraine through the adventures of a beekeeper.

In 2024, the novel was adapted as a feature film by Ukrainian director Dmytro Moysieiev. The film won several awards in Ukraine.
