= Penguin Lost =

2005 novel by Andrey Kurkov

- First edition
- Author: Andrey Kurkov
- Translator: George Bird
- Language: Russian
- Genre: Satire, Surrealism
- Publisher: Vintage
- Publication place: Ukraine
- Media type: Print (Paperback)
- Pages: 256 pp
- ISBN: 978-0-09-946169-2
- Preceded by: Death and the Penguin

Penguin Lost is a novel by Andrey Kurkov. Originally published in 2002 in Russian (as Закон улитки, English: The Law of the Snail), it was translated by George Bird and published in English in 2010. It is the sequel to the author's novel Death and the Penguin.

== Summary ==
The novel follows the life of a writer, Viktor Alekseyevich Zolotaryov, in a struggling post-Soviet society. After fleeing from the mafia to the Faraday Station in Antarctica, Viktor passes some time at the polar research station. After a few months, he returns to Kyiv with an additional (Polish) passport, in case he requires cover. Back in Ukraine and needing a job, he starts work on the election campaign for a different Mafia boss, and discovers that his pet penguin, Misha, had been removed from an animal hospital in Kyiv (where he had undergone heart-transplant surgery at the end of the previous novel, "Death and the Penguin") as part of some shady exchange among mafia operatives. His new employer gives him information as to the whereabouts of Misha, who has been removed to a private zoo in Chechnya, owned by a local strongman. Victor begins another journey, this time across the former Soviet Union, in pursuit of his beloved pet.

The trip takes him through Russia, into the heart of war-torn Chechnya, where day-to-day reality is drastically altered, and different laws of interacting among people apply. The original Russian-language title of the book, The Law of the Snail, refers to a pet saying of Victor's Mafia boss, that every person should have his or her own "shell" (that is, a protecting mob group), and he/she is alive only as long as the "shell" is not lost. Through his surreal travels and experiences, Victor finds himself pondering the multitude of manifestations of the Law, as it emerges from various angles in its different perspectives in the situations where his pursuits take him.

The Complete Review said of the novel:

Told in a laconic, almost off-hand way, cleverly observed, with a few neat inventions, and surprisingly solid characterization despite so little space devoted to fleshing out characters, Penguin Lost is frequently surprising and affecting. Both comic and dark, its success stems from the fact that there's no cynicism at work here -- and little manipulation of feelings -- and it is a worthy complement to Death and the Penguin.
