= Milanówek =

Garden city in Poland

- Garden city
- Milanówek Miasto-ogród
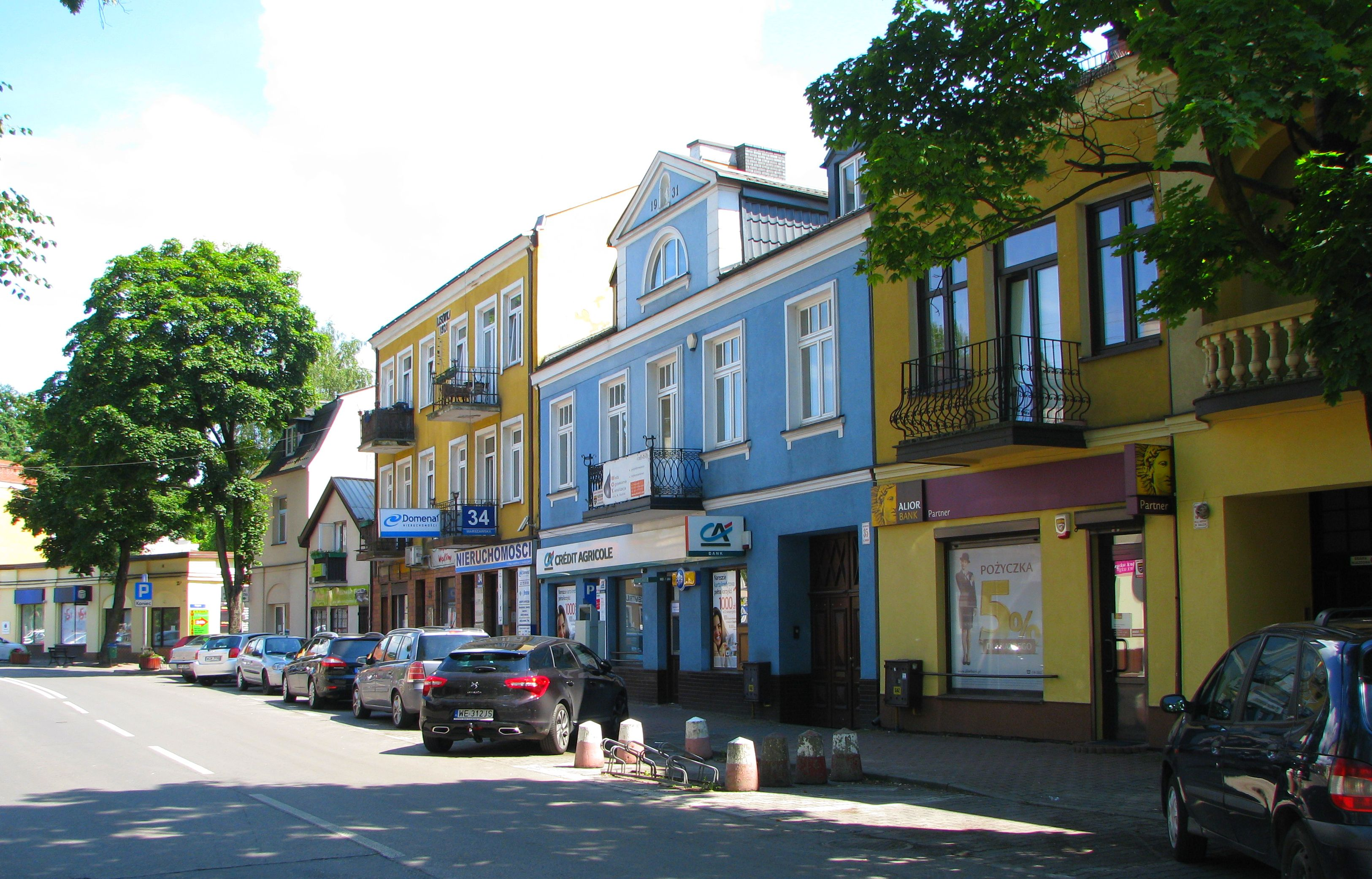
- Warszawska Street in Milanówek

- Flag Coat of arms

- Location within Poland
- Coordinates: 52°7′N 20°39′E
- Country: Poland
- Voivodeship: Masovian
- County: Grodzisk
- Gmina: Milanówek (urban gmina)
- Town rights: 1951

Government
  - Mayor: Piotr Remiszewski

Area
  - Total: 13.52 km^{2} (5.22 sq mi)

Population (2008)
  - Total: 15,449
  - Density: 1,143/km^{2} (2,960/sq mi)
- Time zone: UTC+1 (CET)
  - Summer (DST): UTC+2 (CEST)
- Postal code: 05-822
- Area code: +48 22
- Car plates: WGM
- Website: milanowek.pl

Milanówek [mʲilaˈnuvɛk] is a town and urban commune in central Poland, in the Grodzisk County in the Masovian Voivodeship. Located near Warsaw, it is often considered an outlying suburb of the capital of Poland and part of wider Warsaw metropolitan area. The town has approximately 15,449 inhabitants.

== Geography ==
It is located on the Middle Masovian Plain.

== History ==
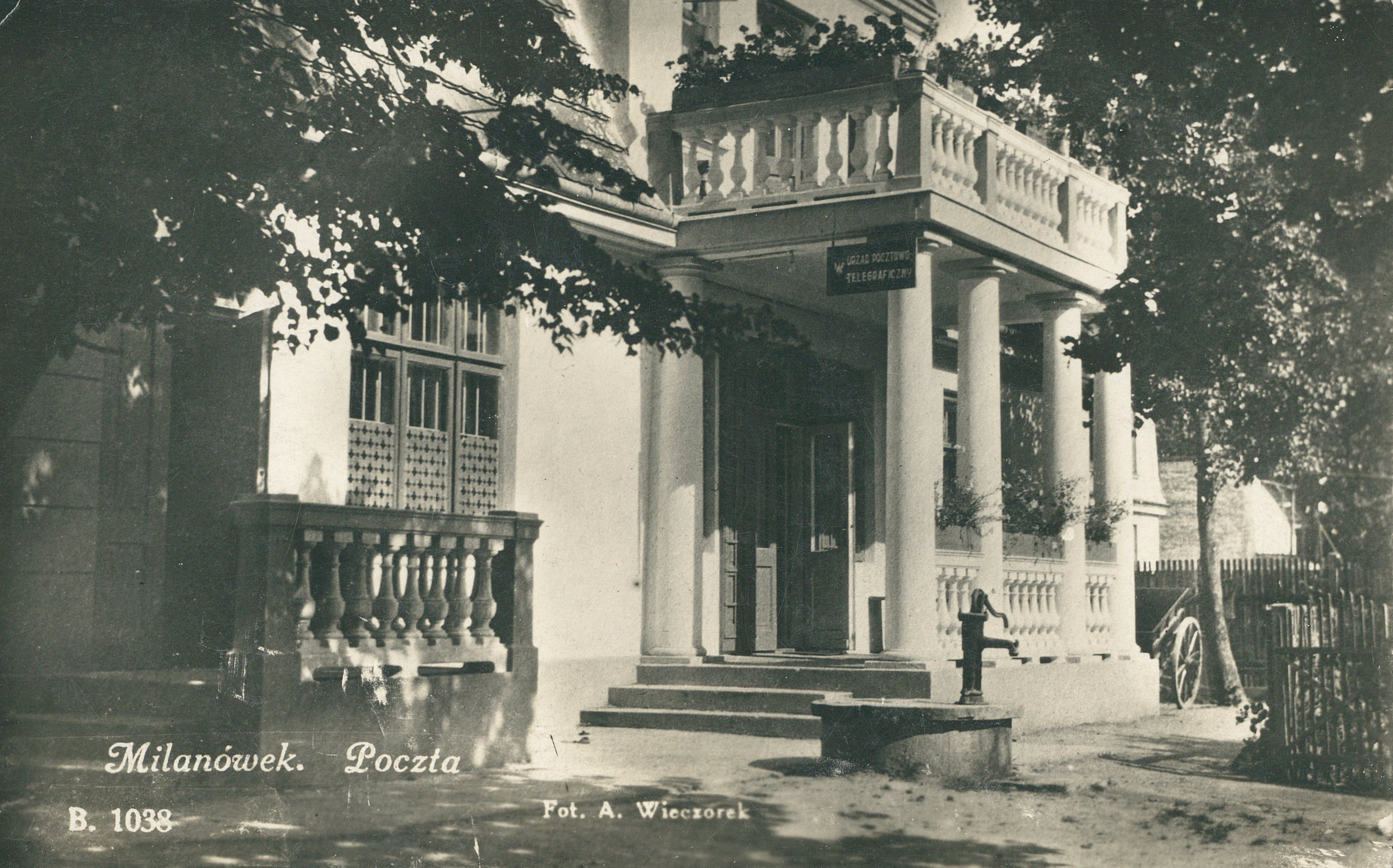
Post office in the interwar period

Milanówek was established in the late 19th and early 20th century as a result of parceling land belonging to Michał Lasocki, and lying along the Warsaw-Vienna Railway.

Since the beginning, Milanówek was a summer resort for wealthy residents of Warsaw, who set up lavish summer homes that often, when the owners decided to move permanently, were turned into grand villas. The most famous of the early holiday-makers was Polish writer, Boleslaw Prus. Another permanent resident of the town was sculptor Jan Szczepkowski.

Developed in the interwar period, and still dominant in the older part of town, is some residential architecture. In 1924, the Central Experimental Station of Silk Production was founded.

During the German invasion of Poland at the start of World War II, on 13 September 1939, some soldiers of the Polish 72nd Infantry Regiment were taken prisoner in Milanówek, along with their commander, Lt. Col. Karol Chrobaczyński. During the war, an urn with the heart of Frédéric Chopin, transferred from Holy Cross Church in Krakowskie Przedmieście in Warsaw, was stored in St. Hedwig Church in Milanówek. The German occupiers operated a forced labour camp for Jews. Milanówek was home to a secret radio monitoring station run by the Polish resistance movement, which provided foreign news to Dziennik Radiowy, the main Polish underground newspaper covering international news. In 1943, local Poles took in a number of kidnapped Polish children from the Zamość region, which were either bought out or secretly taken off German trains. The underground University of the Western Lands gave secret lectures and an underground theater group performed in Milanówek. During the Warsaw Uprising vital organs of Polish Underground State moved to Milanówek and gave the town the nickname "Little London". Some of the Poles who were expelled from Warsaw after the Warsaw Uprising relocated to Milanówek.

In 1951 Milanówek received town rights. In 1961 the town limits were extended, taking over villages including Nowa Wieś (now this part of the town is called Milanowek Kazimierówka). In the communist period there was further development of industry, especially the creation of a factory for surgical and dental instruments: "MIFAMA".

After the administrative reform of 1999, Milanówek became one of the six municipalities forming the Grodzisk Mazowiecki County.

== Sights ==
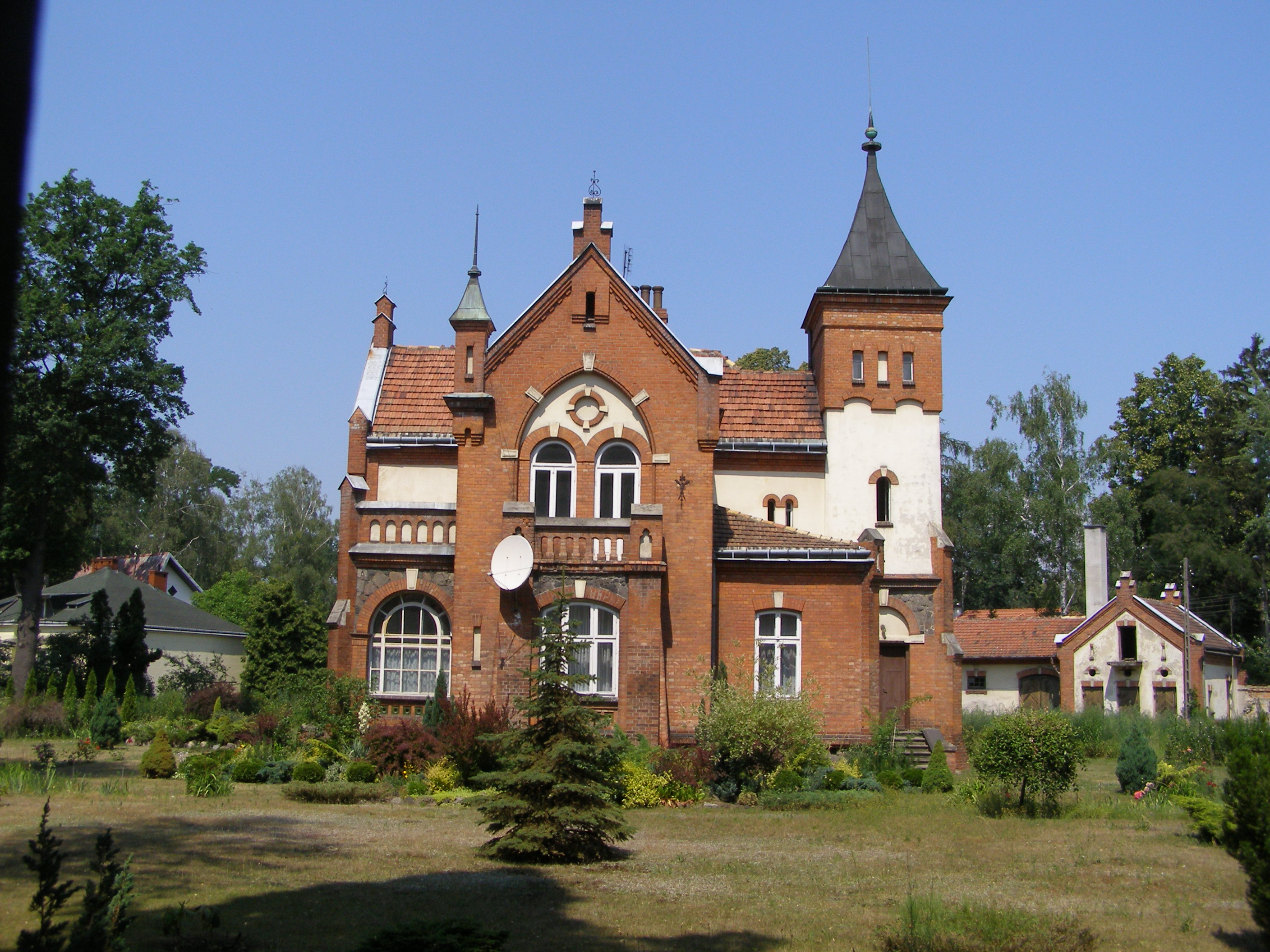
Villa Borówka

Monuments of Milanowek include the parish church of St. Hedwig, the "Turczynek" villa, accommodation for soldiers from World War II and many villas built between 1896 - 1945, including "Potęga", "Matulinek", "Hygea", and "Borówka". They are all in the national register of historic monuments (26 items). 388 pre-war villas and other valuable buildings in the middle of Milanowek have been included in the national register of historic monuments.

The Milanówek Museum of Games and Computers (Milanowskie Muzeum Gier i Komputerów) contains a collection of computers and video games from the 1980s and 1990s.

== Economy ==
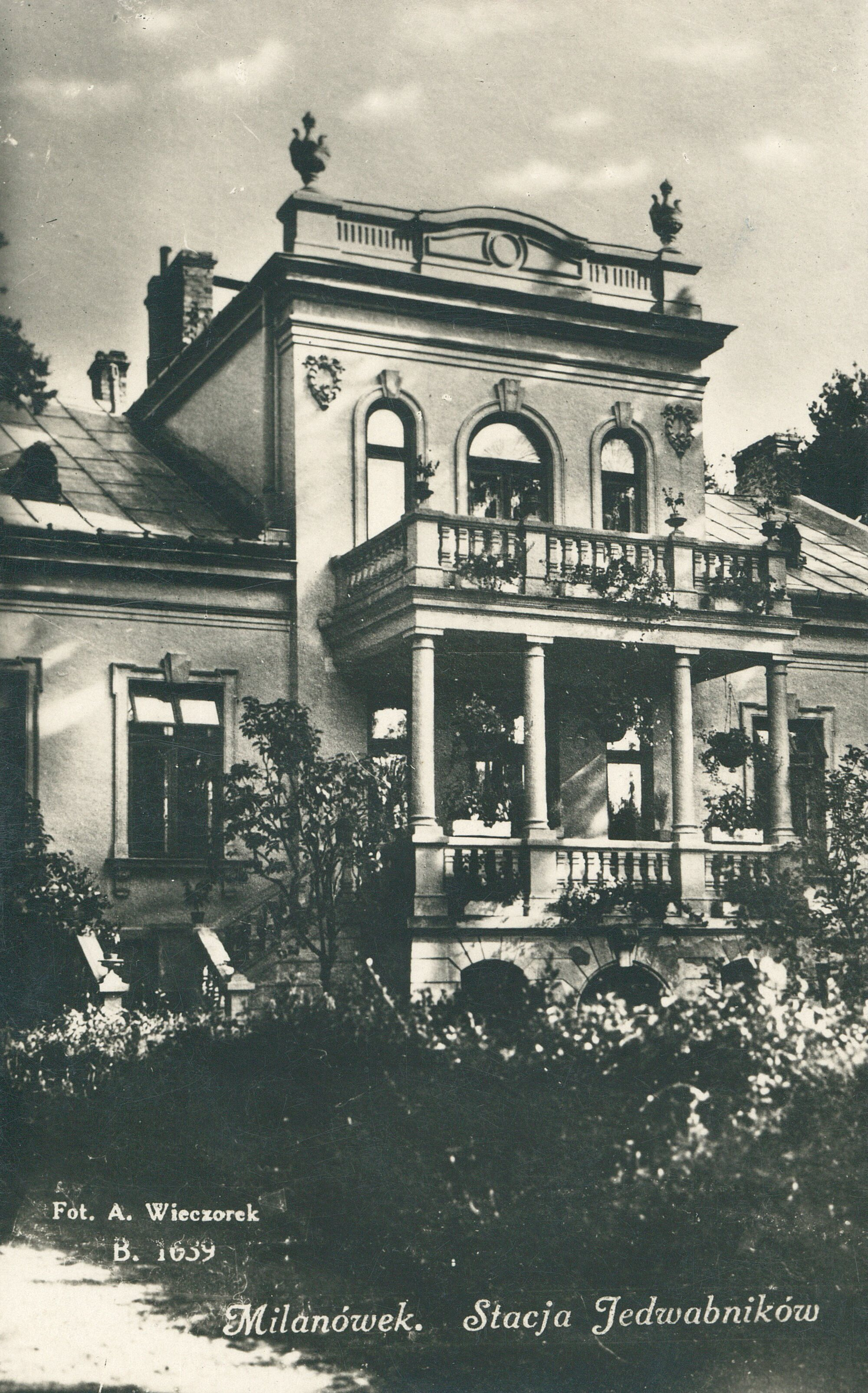
Central Experimental Station of Silk Production in the interwar period

The Jedwab Polski silk factory, established in 1924, is based in Milanówek.

There are several krówki (traditional Polish candy) production companies in Milanówek.

== Transport ==
In addition to Milanówek's mainline railway station, the town is served by Milanówek Grudów and Polesie stations of the Warsaw Commuter Railway.

== Sports ==
Football club Milan Milanówek was founded in 1986. As of 2021, they compete in the fifth-tier IV liga in the Masovian II group.

== Notable residents ==
- Klaudia Alagierska (born 1996), volleyball player
- Marek Bieńczyk (born 1956), writer, historian of literature, translator and essayist, winner of Nike Award (2012)
- Marek Cieślak (born 1950), speedway rider
- Marcin Dorociński (born 1973), film, television and stage actor
- Krzysztof Miszczak (born 1955), political scientist

== Twin towns – sister cities ==
Milanówek is twinned with:

- Fumone, Italy
- Lidzbark Warmiński, Poland
- Welzheim, Germany
