= Andrey Kurkov =

Ukrainian writer (born 1961)

Andrii Kurkov
- Андрій Курков; Андрей Курков
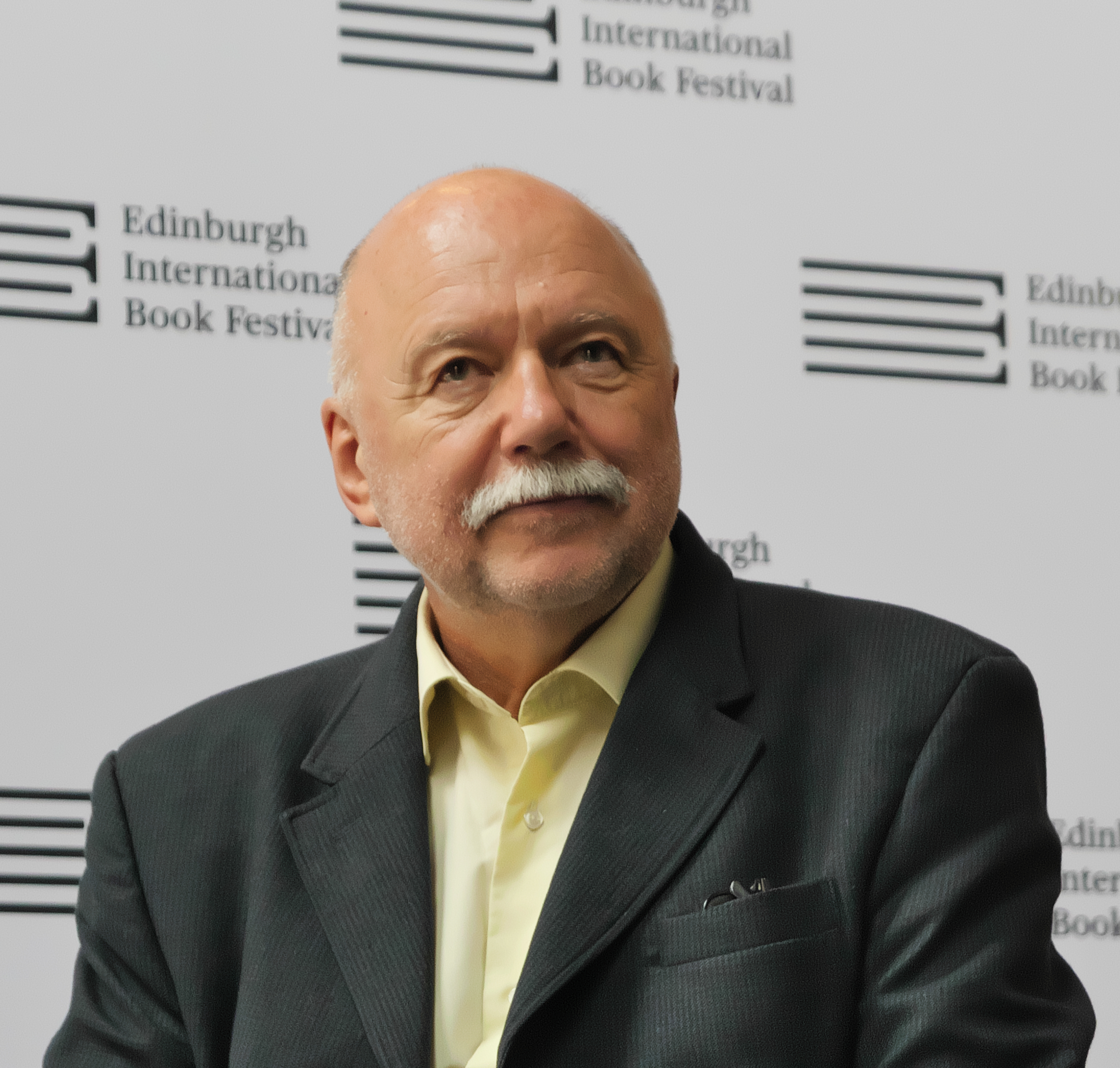
- Kurkov in 2025
- Born: 23 April 1961 (age 65); Leningrad, Russian SFSR, Soviet Union
- Education: Kyiv Foreign Languages Institute
- Occupation: Writer

Andrii Yuriyovych Kurkov (Ukrainian: Андрій Юрійович Курков, IPA: [ɐnˈd⁽ʲ⁾r⁽ʲ⁾ij ˈjur⁽ʲ⁾ijowɪtʃ kʊrˈkɔu̯]; born 23 April 1961) is a Ukrainian author and public intellectual who writes in Russian and Ukrainian. He is the author of 19 novels, including the bestselling Death and the Penguin, nine books for children, and about 20 documentary, fiction and TV movie scripts. His work is currently translated into 37 languages, including English, Spanish, Japanese, French, German, Italian, Chinese, Swedish, Persian and Hebrew, and published in 65 countries. Kurkov, who has long been a respected commentator on Ukraine for the international media, notably in Europe and the United States, has written assorted articles for various publications worldwide. His books are full of black humour, post-Soviet reality and elements of surrealism.

== Life and works ==
Kurkov on the cover of Culture and Life magazine in 2016

Kurkov's father was a test pilot and his mother was a doctor. When he was just 2 his family relocated to Kyiv in connection with his father's work. He started writing at the age of seven when, after the death of two of his three pet hamsters, he wrote a poem about the loneliness of the remaining pet. He also produced poetry about Lenin, purportedly inspired by his Soviet education at the time.

Having graduated in 1983 from the Kyiv Foreign Languages Institute as a trained Japanese translator, Kurkov was assigned military service assisting the KGB. However, he managed to get his papers changed to service with the military police. This offered him a greater degree of freedom during and after his service period. He was assigned a prison guard position in Odessa. It was during this period that Kurkov wrote all of his children's stories.

His first novel was published two weeks before the fall of the Soviet Union, and in the ensuing social and political turmoil he made the first steps towards self-publishing and distribution. Borrowing money from friends to fund his work, Kurkov managed to publish independently. While organising distribution around Ukraine, he would also sell copies by hand from stalls on busy streets.

Like many successful writers, Kurkov had difficulty getting his first publishing contract. He reportedly received 500 rejections before being accepted, at which time he had written almost eight complete novels.

Later in his career, he won acclaim as one of the most successful Ukrainian authors in the post-Soviet era and has been featured on European bestseller lists. His novel The Bickford Fuse (published in 2009 in Russian, and in Boris Dralyuk's English-language translation in 2016 by MacLehose Press) was characterised by Sam Leith in The Financial Times as "a sort of cross between The Pilgrim's Progress, Catch-22, Heart of Darkness and Cormac McCarthy's The Road, with a faint shading, here and there, of Samuel Beckett: an insistently dreamlike absurdist satire shaped by the vastness of Russia's landmass and the insanity of its Soviet-era ideology", and reviewed by The Guardian as a "genre-defying work, fusing picaresque adventure with post-apocalyptic parable", while Kurkov himself called it "the dearest and most important of all my works". He has been described by Ian Sansom as "a serious writer never more serious than when he's being funny about unfunny things, and with a whole lifetime of unfunny things to be serious about."

In 2018, he was elected as the President of PEN Ukraine.

Kurkov's novel Grey Bees, which has "elements of both the fable and the epic", dramatises the conflict in his country through the adventures of a beekeeper. The novel was translated into French by Paul Lequesne as Les abeilles grises, which won the 2022 Prix Médicis étranger, and into English by Boris Dralyuk, winning the inaugural Gregg Barrios Book in Translation Prize from the National Book Critics Circle.

In 2024 Kurkov released The Silver Bone, the first in a new series of detective novels titled "The Kyiv Mysteries". The second book, The Stolen Heart, was published in 2025. The third book, Lost Soldiers, appeared in 2026.

Kurkov lives in Kyiv with his English wife, Elizabeth, and their three children. After the 2022 Russian invasion of Ukraine, he became an internally displaced person and continued to write and broadcast about the war. A bilingual, native Russian speaker, in a 2022 interview Kurkov speculated that Russia’s war on Ukraine, rather than suppress Ukrainian culture and identity, would potentially have the opposite effect, encouraging Ukrainian writers, especially those whose native language is Russian, to publish increasingly, or even exclusively, in Ukrainian.

== Bibliography ==
Novels translated into English:

Book Name	ISBN	Publication Year	Translator
Death and the Penguin	9781860469459	2001	George Bird
Penguin Lost	9780099461692	2005	George Bird
A Matter of Death and Life	9780099461586	2005	George Bird
The Case of the General's Thumb	9780099455257	2009	George Bird
The President's Last Love	9780099485049	2009	Random House Publishing
The Good Angel of Death	9780099513490	2010	Andrew Bromfield
The Milkman in the Night	9781846553981	2011	Amanda Love Darragh
The Gardener from Ochakov	9781846556159	2013	Amanda Love Darragh
The Bickford Fuse	9780857055583	2016	Boris Dralyuk
Grey Bees	9780857059345	2020	Boris Dralyuk
Jimi Hendrix Live in Lviv	9781529427820	2023	Reuben Woolley
The Silver Bone	9781529426496	2024	Boris Dralyuk
The Stolen Heart		2025	Boris Dralyuk
The Lost Soldiers	9780063488670	2026	Boris Dralyuk

Non-fiction published in English:

Book name	ISBN	Publication year
Ukraine Diaries: Dispatches from Kiev	9781846559471	2014
Diary of an Invasion	9781646052812	2022
Our Daily War		2024

== See also ==
- History of Ukraine (1991–present)
- History of Ukraine (1945–1991)
