= Death and the Penguin =

Novel by Andrey Kurkov

- Author: Andrey Kurkov
- Original title: Смерть постороннего
- Translator: George Bird
- Cover artist: Pablo Armago
- Language: Russian
- Genre: Satire, Surrealism
- Publisher: Vintage
- Publication date: 1996
- Publication place: Ukraine
- English publication date: 2001
- Media type: Print (Paperback)
- Pages: 228 pp
- ISBN: 978-1-86046-945-9
- Followed by: Penguin Lost

Death and the Penguin is a novel by Ukrainian author Andrey Kurkov. Originally published in 1996 in Russian (as Smert postoronnego, (Note: Russian: Смерть постороннего) transl. Death of a stranger), it was translated and published in English in 2001. The events of the novel take place in 1996 and 1997 in Kyiv. It is a bleak, satirical work with surreal elements and dark humour.

The novel became Kurkov's most famous work, translated into more than 30 languages. In 1997, the novel was translated into German and published by the Swiss publishing house Diogenes, and it was for the German-language edition that Picknick auf dem Eis first appeared. The novel was first published in Ukrainian under the title Death of a Stranger in 2000, translated by Lesya Gerasymchuk. The Ukrainian translation of the novel became the first Ukrainian translation of any Kurkov book.

== Summary ==
The novel follows the life of a second-rate writer, Viktor Alekseyevich Zolotaryov, in a struggling post-Soviet society. Viktor, initially aiming to write novels, gets a job writing obituaries for a local newspaper. The source of the title is Viktor's pet penguin Misha, a king penguin obtained after the local zoo in Kyiv gave away its animals to those who could afford to support them. Kurkov uses Misha as a sort of mirror of (and eventual source of salvation for) Viktor. Throughout the story, Misha is also lost, unhappy and generally out of his element, literally and figuratively. One of the striking themes of the novel is Viktor's tendency to go from justifiably paranoid appraisals of his increasingly dangerous position to a serene, almost childish, peace of mind. As such there are many elements of existentialist thought in the text.

Viktor's work is accepted enthusiastically by the editor-in-chief of the paper, but Viktor soon finds that his obituaries are being used as a hit list for enemies of some unknown organization for which the paper is just a front. Shortly thereafter, he is left to look after Sonya, the daughter of his mysterious friend Misha (referred to as Misha-non-penguin in the text to differentiate him from Misha the penguin). He and the child develop a tenuous relationship, which serves to further highlight Viktor's isolated existence. After Misha-non-penguin leaves Sonya a large sum of money, Viktor hires a nanny (Nina), who is the niece of his only other friend Sergey. Over time, a physical yet passionless relationship develops between Viktor and Nina and the "family" is crystallized. The deepest emotional relationship amongst all four individuals is between Viktor and his penguin.

After settling into a more or less normal life with Sonya and Nina and a lucrative side job of attending funerals of former obituary subjects with Misha, Viktor's illusion of security is undermined. He finds that an anonymous man (referred in the text only as "fat man") has been following Sonya and Nina and asking them endless questions posing as an old friend. When he tracks down his follower he finds that the fat man has become the new obituary writer and he, Viktor, has become the new obituary subject. At the same time, Misha has fallen ill and needs a heart transplant. Anonymous sponsors foot the bill, but Viktor has decided that Misha is to be returned to his natural habitat in Antarctica. He donates $2 000 to the forthcoming Ukrainian expedition to Antarctica on condition that they take Misha. However, after finding that he is a marked man, Viktor decides to let the mafia take care of the penguin and he himself takes the ticket to Antarctica. The book ends with Viktor successfully fleeing to Antarctica.

== See also ==
- Penguin Lost (original title - The Snail Law), a sequel to this novel
