= Dariusz Pawłoś =

Polish germanist

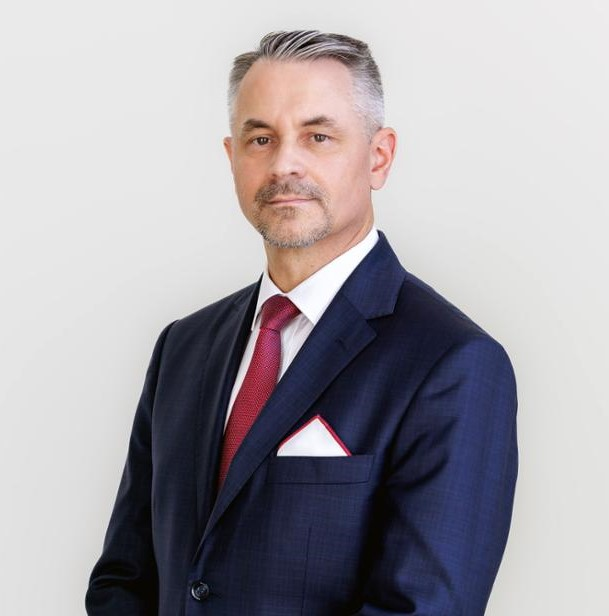

Poland Ambassador to Germany
- In office 22 November 2022 – July 2024
- Appointed by: Andrzej Duda
- Preceded by: Andrzej Przyłębski
- Succeeded by: Jan Tombiński

Personal details
- Born: 16 April 1969 (age 57) Hrubieszów, Poland
- Children: 2
- Education: Maria Curie-Skłodowska University in Lublin
- Profession: Germanist, diplomat

Dariusz Pawłoś (born 16 April 1969 in Hrubieszów) is a Polish Germanist and diplomat, from 2022 to 2024 serving as an ambassador to Germany.

== Life ==
In 1993, Pawłoś has graduated from German studies at the Maria Curie-Skłodowska University in Lublin. He was studying also political science at the University of Warsaw. In 1990s he was teaching German language at the high school in Warsaw. In 1995, he joined Foundation for Polish-German Reconciliation and between 2008 and 2017 he was chairman of the board. In 2007, he was head of the Bureau of the Minister of Foreign Affairs of Poland for Polish-German Cooperation. He was giving summer lectures for foreign students at the University of Warsaw. He was representing Polish government at the Foundation Remembrance, Responsibility and Future. From 2017 to 2021, he was the spokesperson and head of the Section for Communication and Public Diplomacy at the Embassy of Poland in Berlin. From 2021 to 2022, he was deputy director of the Department of Public and Cultural Diplomacy, Ministry of Foreign Affairs. In 2022, he was the managing director of the German-Polish Youth Office (GPYO).

On 18 October 2022 Pawłoś was nominated Poland ambassador to Germany. On 22 November 2022, he presented his letter of credence to the president of Germany Frank-Walter Steinmeier and officially began his term. He returned to Warsaw in July 2024.

In 2005, he was awarded with the Decoration of Honour for Services to the Republic of Austria.

Besides Polish and German, Pawłoś speaks English and Russian. He is married, with a son and a daughter.
