= Maxim Osipov (writer) =

Russian writer, playwright and cardiologist (born 1963)

- Максим Осипов
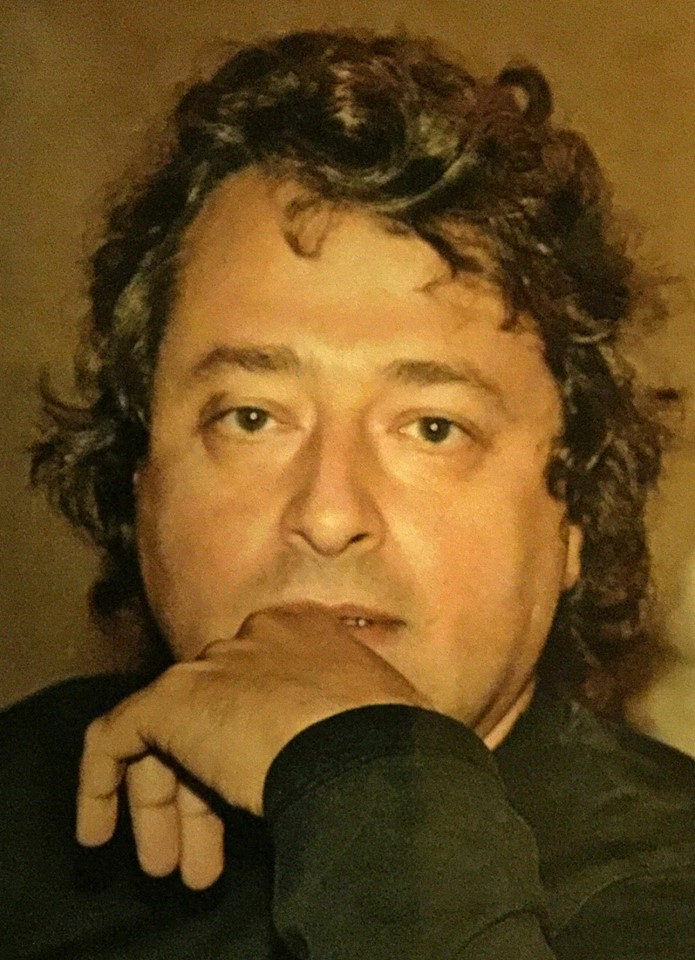
- Born: October 4, 1963 (age 63); Moscow, Russian SFSR, USSR
- Occupation: Writer
- Writing career
- Genres: Fiction, non-fiction, drama

Maxim Alexandrovich Osipov (Russian: Максим Александрович О́сипов; born 4 October 1963) is a Russian writer and cardiologist. His short stories and essays have won a number of prizes, and his plays have been staged and broadcast on the radio in Russia.

== Biography ==
Osipov was born in Moscow and received his medical training at the Russian National Research Medical University. In the early 1990s, he was a research fellow at the University of California, San Francisco. Upon returning to Moscow, he continued to practice medicine, co-authored a textbook on clinical cardiology, and founded a publishing house, Practica, which specialized in medical, musical, and theological material. After moving to Tarusa, a town 101 kilometers from Moscow, Osipov began working at the local hospital. He also established a charitable foundation to ensure the hospital's survival and to improve its standard of care. He lived, wrote, and practiced medicine in Tarusa until March 2022. After the Russian invasion of Ukraine he left Russia. He first travelled to Armenia and then to Germany.

== Literary career ==
Osipov made his literary debut in 2007, in the journal Znamya, with a lyrical essay on his experiences in Tarusa. He has since published several volumes of fiction and non-fiction and his works have been translated into 18 languages. His debut collection in English, Rock, Paper, Scissors and Other Stories, translated by Boris Dralyuk, Alex Fleming and Anne Marie Jackson, appeared in April 2019 from NYRB Classics, followed by a second compilation (Kilometer 101) in 2022.

== Literary style ==
In an interview with Daniel Medin, published in the Los Angeles Review of Books, Osipov explained his affinity for shorter forms: "I think that short stories, even long short stories (my personal preference), can be closer to poetry than to novels. It’s not the subject matter that I find central to short fiction, but style and form, which far exceed content in their importance. Being deeply knowledgeable about your material — in my case, about medicine and, to a lesser extent, religion, music, theater, politics, even chess — is not essential, however much it may help."

In the same interview, he spoke of the role of music in his life, as well as of its influence on his approach to writing: "I’m not the first to observe that music is the greatest teacher of composition in any art, including writing. There are many similarities between short stories and musical sonatas. Both last between 15 and 40 minutes. They 'make nothing happen,' as Auden said of poetry. When we listen to a sonata for the first time the purpose is to decide whether we want to listen to it again or not. The same should occur when you read a short story." Nobel laureate Svetlana Alexievich writes of the lingering impact of his stories: "When you delve into Osipov’s texts you see that they are deceptively simple, just like Shalamov’s: Behind this childish ordinariness there lies a hidden chasm. The whole time they leave you thinking how difficult it is to love humanity — wonderful, repulsive, and terrifying as it is — but in order to stay human, that’s exactly what you must do: You must love man. Your soul is restless — it is thinking. To inspire such thoughts — that’s something that only true literature can do."

== Selected bibliography ==
- Грех жаловаться (2009). It's Wrong to Complain
- Крик домашней птицы (2011). The Cry of the Domestic Fowl
- Человек эпохи Возрождения (2012). Renaissance Man
- Волною морскою (2014). The Waves of the Sea
- пгт Вечность (2017). Town of Eternity
- 101-й километр: очерки из провинциальной жизни (2019). Kilometer 101: Essays from Provincial Life
- Люксембург и другие русские истории (2020). Luxembourg and Other Russian Stories

Compilations in English

- Rock, Paper, Scissors and Other Stories, ed. Boris Dralyuk, trans. Boris Dralyuk, Alex Fleming, and Anne Marie Jackson (New York Review Books, 2019)
- Kilometer 101, ed. Boris Dralyuk, trans. Boris Dralyuk, Nicolas Pasternak Slater, and Alex Fleming (New York Review Books, 2022)
