= Ukraine Diaries: Dispatches from Kiev =

2014 diary by Andrey Kurkov

Ukraine Diaries: Dispatches from Kiev is a 2014 nonfiction diary by Ukrainian writer Andrey Kurkov. It was published in English by Harvill Secker in July 2014. The book collects Kurkov's diary entries from 21 November 2013 to late April 2014, covering the Euromaidan protests in Kyiv, the removal of President Viktor Yanukovych and Russia's annexation of Crimea.
