= A Matter of Death and Life =

1996 novel by Andrey Kurkov

- Author: Andrey Kurkov
- Translator: George Bird
- Language: Russian
- Genre: Satire, Surrealism
- Publisher: Vintage
- Publication place: Ukraine
- English publication date: 05/08/2010
- Media type: Print (Paperback)
- Pages: 112
- ISBN: 978-0-09-946158-6

A Matter of Death and Life is a novel by Andrey Kurkov. Originally published in 1996 in Russian, it was translated and published in English in 2005.
