= Nimrod International Journal =

- Discipline: Literature
- Language: English
- Edited by: Boris Dralyuk

Publication details
- History: 1956–present
- Publisher: University of Tulsa (United States)
- Frequency: Biannual

Standard abbreviations
- ISO 4: Nimrod Int. J.

Indexing
- ISSN: 0029-053X

Links
- Journal homepage

The Nimrod International Journal is a literary journal established in 1956 that publishes fiction, nonfiction, and poetry.

== History ==
The journal was established in 1956 by students at the University of Tulsa, and its first editor-in-chief was James Land Jones. The journal began as a thrice-yearly publication, but since 1970, it has been published twice a year, once in the spring and once in the fall.

Notable contributors include Sue Monk Kidd, Ursula K. Le Guin, Gish Jen, Natalie Diaz, Ange Mlinko, and Tricia Holland Baatz, among others.

== Awards ==
Stories from the journal have been published in The Best American Short Stories and The Best American Essays, and have won the O. Henry Award and the Pushcart Prize anthologies, among others.
