= Dariusz Kozubek =

Polish footballer

Personal information
- Full name: Dariusz Kozubek
- Date of birth: 11 April 1975 (age 51)
- Place of birth: Kielce, Poland
- Height: 1.82 m (6 ft 0 in)
- Position: Midfielder

Senior career*
Years	Team	Apps	(Gls)
1992–1999	Korona Kielce		
1996	→ KSZO Ostrowiec (loan)		
2000	Górnik Łęczna		
2000	KSZO Ostrowiec		
2001–2002	Ceramika Opoczno		
2002–2004	Szczakowianka Jaworzno	78	(12)
2005–2007	Korona Kielce	17	(2)
2006	→ Polonia Warsaw (loan)	11	(0)
2007–2008	Zagłębie Sosnowiec	11	(0)
2008	Concordia Piotrków Trybunalski	8	(0)
2008–2009	Pelikan Łowicz	17	(1)
2009	Korona Kielce	5	(0)
2010–2011	Broń Radom		
2011–2014	Łysica Bodzentyn	86	(9)
2014–2016	Spartakus Daleszyce	20	(2)
2017–2019	Lubrzanka Kajetanów		

Managerial career
- 2014–2016: Spartakus Daleszyce (player-manager)
- 2017–2019: Lubrzanka Kajetanów (player-manager)
- 2019–2020: Naprzód Jędrzejów
- 2021: Korona Kielce II
- * Club domestic league appearances and goals

Dariusz Kozubek (born 11 April 1975) is a Polish football manager and former player.

Kozubek has previously played for Szczakowianka Jaworzno, Polonia Warsaw, Korona Kielce and Zagłębie Sosnowiec Korona Kielce in the Polish Ekstraklasa.

== Honours ==
Korona Kielce

- II liga: 2004–05
