= Dariusz Kotwica =

Polish cross-country serial killer

- Born: Dariusz Paweł Kotwica; 1986 (age 39–40); Opole, Poland
- Other names: "The Euro Ripper" "Europe's first serial killer" "The Travelling Serial Killer" "Vampire from Metalchem"
- Conviction: Murder
- Penalty: Involuntary commitment

Details
- Victims: 3+
- Span of crimes: April – May 2015
- Country: Sweden, Austria (convicted); Netherlands, Czech Republic, United Kingdom (suspected)
- States: Västra Götaland, Vienna
- Date apprehended: 8 June 2015
- Imprisoned at: Treatment center in Göllersdorf, Austria

Dariusz Paweł Kotwica (born 1986), known as the Euro Ripper, is an itinerant Polish criminal and serial killer, responsible for at least three murders of pensioners in Austria and Sweden. Described as the "first European serial killer" who travelled using open borders, he is thought to be responsible for additional murders in the Netherlands, the Czech Republic and the United Kingdom. The mentally ill Kotwica is currently in a treatment centre in Göllersdorf, Austria.

== Biography ==
=== Early life ===
Kotwica grew up in Metalchem, a housing estate on the outskirts of Opole, a city in southern Poland. Although described as an average, normal guy, he was known around the area for always wearing a tracksuit when walking around the estate.

Kotwica was raised solely by his mother and never met his father. Despite his failing grades in school and truancy, Kotwica was considered very intelligent, and was notably interested in Greek mythology. Sometime around 2005, he left his native Poland and began travelling around Europe, first settling to live in England for several years.

== Crimes ==
Kotwica seriously injured an unknown person in the Netherlands in 2011, attempted to murder a shopkeeper in Salzburg, Austria in 2012 after failing to shoplift, and robbed a grocery store in Germany in January 2015.

In April 2015, he stabbed 79-year-old Swedish pensioner Bo Georg Ehrlander to death. Ehrlander was later found where he was murdered, lying on the kitchen floor of his Saltholmen home. His car keys were also found to be missing.

On 21 May, Kotwica broke into the home of 75-year-old local politician Gerhard Hintermeier and his 74-year-old wife, Erna. Both were brutally battered and stabbed, with Kotwica raping Erna before killing her. He then proceeded to write "Tantal" on her body with brown paint.

== Capture, trial and sentence ==
Kotwica was the subject of an international manhunt and was arrested on 8 June 2015 at a railway station in Düsseldorf, after being caught on surveillance cameras using the dead couple's ATM card. He was quickly extradited to Austria, where he soon confessed to committing the double murder. Kotwica also admitted having killed Ehrlander, whose car keys were found in his possession. When questioned on his motive, Kotwica confessed that he felt "joy" when torturing his innocent and randomly-selected victims.

Kotwica was soon sent to court, where he claimed that his "inner voices" were telling him to kill. Psychiatrists thoroughly examined him, concluding that he has had paranoid schizophrenia for at least 10 years. Kotwica was found guilty and convicted of murdering the Hintermeiers and Ehrlander, but as a result of his mental illness, was transferred to a treatment centre in Göllersdorf, Austria where he is currently detained.

== See also ==
- List of serial killers by country
