= Igor Golomstock =

Russian world art historian (1929–2017)

- Born: 11 January 1929; Kalinin, Soviet Union (now Tver, Russia)
- Died: 12 July 2017 (aged 88)
- Education: Moscow University
- Spouse: Nina Kazarovets
- Children: 1 son
- Parent(s): Naum Kojak; Mary Golomstock

Igor Golomstock (11 January 1929 - 12 July 2017) was a Jewish origin, Russian and English-language, London-based, world art historian. He was the author of several books about Western artists like Pablo Picasso, Hieronymus Bosch, Paul Cézanne, Hans Holbein and Damien Hirst. In Totalitarian Art, he contended that totalitarian art looked the same regardless of the regime, became a weapon of oppression through myth and propaganda.

== Early life ==
Igor Golomstock was born on 11 January 1929 in Kalinin, Soviet Union (now Tver, Russia). After his Karaite Jew father, Naum Kojak, was sent to a gulag, his parents divorced and Igor took his mother's name. From 1939 to 1943, as he was a teenager, Golomstock and his mother lived in Kolyma, a labour camp in the Russian Far East.

Golomstock graduated from Moscow University, where he studied art history.

== Career ==
Golomstock began his career by working for the Soviet Ministry of Culture. He was also a resident scholar at the Pushkin Museum, and he taught art history at his alma mater, Moscow University. After emigrating to the United Kingdom in 1972, he taught art history at University of Essex, the University of St Andrews and the University of Oxford. In 1977, he "co-curated the exhibition Unofficial Art from the Soviet Union at the Institute of Contemporary Arts" in London. He subsequently worked as a radio presenter on the BBC Russian Service.

Golomstock was the author of several books. His first book, co-written with Andrei Sinyavsky, was about Pablo Picasso. His other books were about Hieronymus Bosch, Paul Cézanne, Hans Holbein and Damien Hirst. He was best-known for Totalitarian Art, first published in 1990 and republished in 2011, in which he contended that totalitarian art looked the same regardless of the regime, became a weapon of oppression through myth and propaganda. In particular he showed that both Nazism and Stalinism depicted "industrious families, idealistic soldiers and compassionate leaders." Golomstock found similar features in Fascist and Maoist art.

Golomstock authored his memoir in 2011.

== Personal life and death ==
Golomstock married Nina Kazarovets in 1960; they had a son, Benjamin. They resided in London, U.K. After they separated in the 1990s, he had a relationship with Flora Goldstein, an archeologist. Golomstock was closely associated with Andrei Sinyavsky, who, together with Yuli Daniel, was tried in the landmark Sinyavsky–Daniel trial of 1966. Called as a witness, Golomstock declined to give testimony in support of the prosecution. He was subsequently convicted, sentenced to six months' correctional labour, dismissed from his academic posts, and subjected to professional restrictions. In 1972, he and his wife Nina emigrated from the Soviet Union and settled in the United Kingdom.

Golomstock died on 12 July 2017, aged 88.

== Selected works ==
- Totalitarian Art (1990; 2011)
- Memoirs of an Old Pessimist (2011)
