= Wiedza Powszechna =

Polish publishing house

Wiedza Powszechna (literally "Common Knowledge") is a publishing house in Poland.

It originated in 1946 in Post World War II Poland as a subdivision of the Czytelnik publishing house, initiated by Stanisław Tazbir.

In 1952, with the major rearrangement of the state, which officially became the Polish People's Republic, the government created a separate State Publishing House known as the Wiedza Powszechna, whose full name was Państwowe Wydawnictwo: Wiedza Powszechna (English, "State Publishing House of Common Knowledge") or the Wiedza Powszechna: Państwowe Wydawnictwo Popularno-Naukowe (English, "State-Owned Popular Science Publishing House"). It became a major publisher specializing in dictionaries (vocabularies, encyclopedic dictionaries, etc., language textbooks, phrase books, etc., both for Polish and foreign languages, as well as popular science books in various areas.

In 2007 it was privatized into a sp. z o.o. (Polish equivalent of limited liability company, which went bankrupt in 2011

In 2012 it was reestablished in Warsaw as Wydawnictwo Wiedza Powszechna (Wiedza Powszechna Publishing House), specializing in foreign language dictionaries and textbooks.

== Book series ==
- Biblioteczka dla Kazdego (English, "Bookcase for Everyone")
- Biblioteczka Towarzystwa Wiedzy Powszechne (English, "Library of the Universal Knowledge Society")
- Biblioteczka Wiedzy Historycznej (English, "Library of Historical Knowledge")
- Biblioteka - Kraje, Ludzie, Obyczaje (English, "Library (of) Countries, People, Customs")
- Biblioteka Przygod i Podrozy (English, "Library of Adventures and Travel")
- De la Langue à la Civilisation Française (English, "From French Language to Civilization")
- Kieszonkowa Seria Historyczna (English, "Pocket Historical Series")
- Klio w Niemczech (English, "Clio in Germany")
- Konfrontacje Historyczne (English, "Historical Confrontations")
- Ludy Swiata (English, "The Peoples of the World")
- Malarze Polscy (English,"Polish Painters")
- Mysli i Ludzie (English, "Thoughts and People")
- Mysli Srebrne i Zlote (English, "Silver and Gold Thoughts")
- Omega: Biblioteka Wiedzy Wspolczesnej (English, "Omega: Library of Contemporary Knowledge"); also known as: Biblioteka Wiedzy Wspolczesnej (English, "Library of Contemporary Knowledge")
- Przyroda Polska (English, "Nature Poland")
- Profile (English, "Profile series")
- Sygnaly (English, "Signals series")
- W Szeroki Swiat (English, "In the Wide World")
- Wydawnictwa Popularno-Encyklopedyczne (English, "Popular Encyclopedia Publications")
- Zlota Seria Literatury Popularnonaukowej (English, "Golden Series of Popular Science Literature")
