= Dariusz Sośnicki =

Polish poet (born 1969)

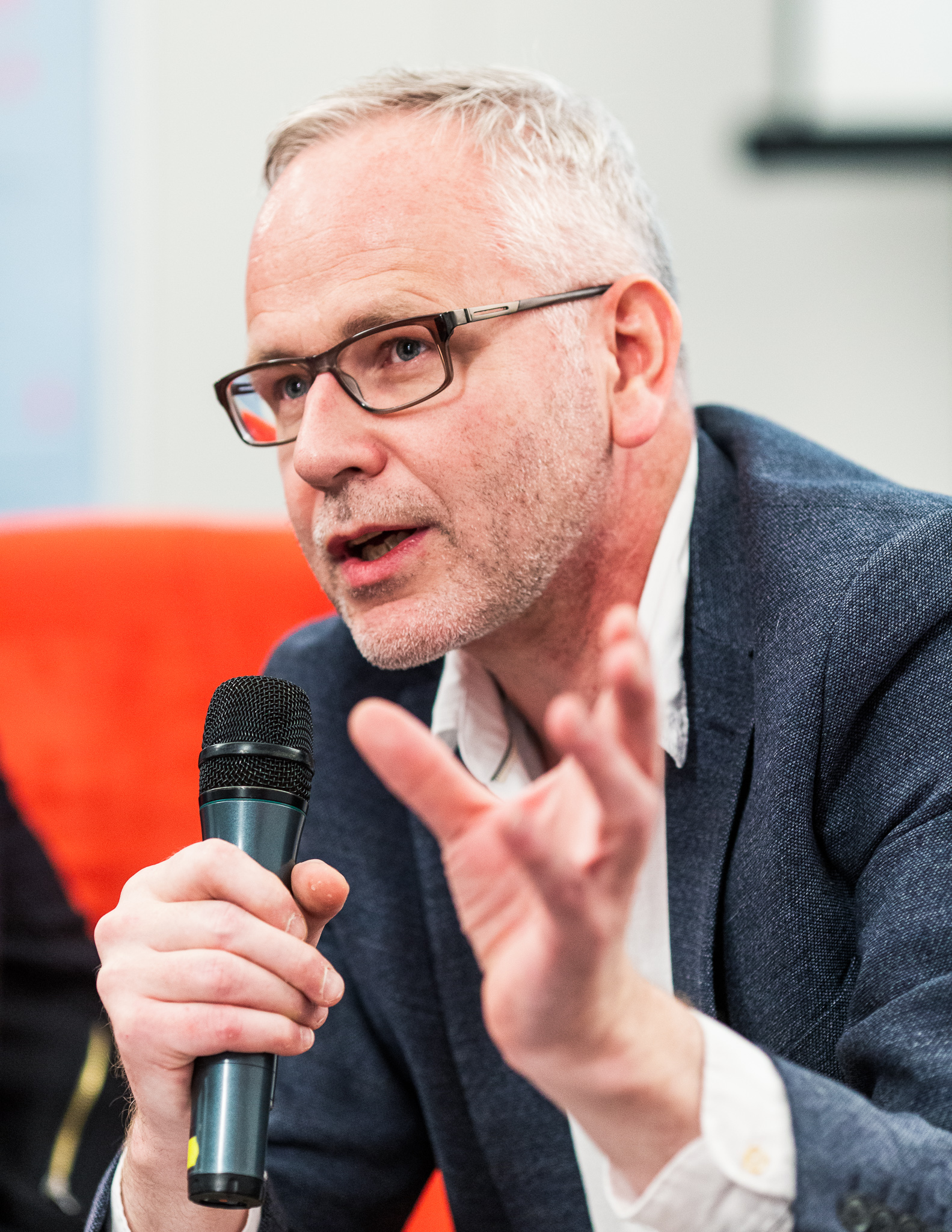
Dariusz Sośnicki

Dariusz Sośnicki is a Polish poet. He was born in 1969 in Kalisz, and studied philosophy at the Adam Mickiewicz University. From 1994 to 1996, he edited the literary journal Nowy Nurt [New Current]. In 2001 he attended the University of Iowa on a writer's grant. He has published numerous books and his work has been translated into English and Romanian, among other languages. He has also translated the work of WH Auden into Polish.

== Works ==
- Marlewo, posł. Marcin Świetlicki, Pracownia, Ostrołęka 1994
- Ikarus, Pomona, Wrocław 1998
- Mężczyzna w dominie [arkusz], Centrum Sztuki – Teatr Dramatyczny, Legnica 1999
- Symetria, Biuro Literackie Port Legnica, Legnica 2002
- Skandynawskie lato, Biuro Literackie, Wrocław 2005
- Folia na wietrze. Wiersze z tomów Marlewo i Ikarus, Biuro Literackie, Wrocław 2007
- Państwo P., Biuro Literackie, Wrocław 2009
- O rzeczach i ludziach. Wiersze zebrane 1991-2010, Biuro Literackie, Wrocław 2011
- Spóźniony owoc radiofonizacji, Biuro Literackie, Wrocław 2014
- Wysokie ogniska. Wiersze wybrane. Wybór i posłowie Paweł Kaczmarski. WBPiCAK, Poznań 2014
- Po domu, Biuro Literackie, Kołobrzeg 2021
- Reprezentacja zwierząt, Wydawnictwo Warstwy, Wrocław 2025

== In translation ==
- Familia P., Editura Tracus Arte & Casa de Editură Max Blecher, Bucureşti, Bistriţa 2011, przeł. Vasile Moga
- The World Shared, BOA Editions, Lannan Translations Selection Series, Rochester, NY 2014, przeł. Piotr Florczyk i Boris Dralyuk
