= Dariusz Antoni Kłeczek =

Polish politician (born 1957)

member of Sejm 2005-2007
- In office 25 September 2005 – ?

Personal details
- Born: 20 June 1957 (age 68)
- Party: Law and Justice

Dariusz Antoni Kłeczek (born 20 June 1957 in Jedlnia Letnisko) is a Polish politician. He was elected to the Sejm on 25 September 2005, getting 16,698 votes in 23 Rzeszów district as a candidate from the Law and Justice list.

He was also a member of Senate 1997-2001.

== See also ==
- Members of Polish Sejm 2005-2007
