= Boris Dralyuk =

Ukrainian-American writer, editor and translator

- Born: 1982 (age 43–44); Odessa Ukrainian Soviet Socialist Republic
- Education: Fairfax High School; UCLA
- Spouse: Jennifer Croft

Boris Dralyuk (born in 1982) is a Ukrainian-American writer, editor and translator. He obtained his high school degree from Fairfax High School and his PhD in Slavic Languages and Literatures from UCLA. He teaches in the English Department at the University of Tulsa. He has taught Russian literature at his alma mater and at the University of St Andrews, Scotland. He was executive editor and editor-in-chief of the Los Angeles Review of Books from 2016 to 2022 and the managing editor of Cardinal Points from 2016 to 2022. In 2024 he was named the editor-in-chief of Nimrod International Journal.

His writings have appeared in numerous outlets, including Times Literary Supplement, The New Yorker, The New York Review of Books, London Review of Books, Paris Review, Granta, World Literature Today, etc. A specialist in the history of noir fiction, he has written introductions to the reissued works of Paul Cain and Raoul Whitfield.

In 2022 Dralyuk published his debut poetry collection, My Hollywood and Other Poems, with Paul Dry Books. It was reviewed positively by Anahid Neressian in The New York Review of Books, who remarked that an "air of upbeat sorrow permeates My Hollywood. It’s an émigré mood, defined by the conviction that things could always be worse."

In 2020 he received the inaugural Kukula Award for Excellence in Nonfiction Book Reviewing from the Washington Monthly. In 2022 he received the inaugural Gregg Barrios Book in Translation Prize from the National Book Critics Circle for his translation of Andrey Kurkov’s Grey Bees. In 2024 he received a Literature Award from the American Academy of Arts and Letters.

== Bibliography ==
=== Translations ===
- Polina Barskova – The Zoo in Winter: Selected Poems (Melville House, 2011)
- Dariusz Sośnicki – The World Shared (BOA Editions, 2014)
- Oleg Woolf – Bessarabian Stamps: Stories (Phoneme Media, 2015)
- Isaac Babel – Red Cavalry (Pushkin Press, 2015)
- Isaac Babel – Odessa Stories (Pushkin Press, 2016)
- Andrey Kurkov – The Bickford Fuse (MacLehose Press, 2016)
- Lev Ozerov – Portraits Without Frames (NYRB Classics, 2018)
- Mikhail Zoshchenko – Sentimental Tales (Columbia University Press, 2018)
- Leo Tolstoy – Lives and Deaths: Essential Stories (Pushkin Press, 2019)
- Igor Golomstock – A Ransomed Dissident: A Life in Art Under the Soviets (I.B. Tauris, 2019, with Sara Jolly)
- Maxim Osipov – Rock, Paper, Scissors, and Other Stories (NYRB Classics, 2019, with Alex Fleming and Anne Marie Jackson)
- Andrey Kurkov – Grey Bees (MacLehose Press, 2020; Deep Vellum, 2022)
- Alexander Pushkin – Peter the Great's African: Experiments in Prose (NYRB Classics, 2022, with Robert and Elizabeth Chandler)
- Isaac Babel – Of Sunshine and Bedbugs: Essential Stories (Pushkin Press, 2022)
- Maxim Osipov – Kilometer 101 (NYRB Classic, 2022, with Nicolas Pasternak Slater and Alex Fleming)
- Taras Prokhasko and Marjana Prokhansko – Who Will Make the Snow? (Elsewhere Editions, 2023, with Jennifer Croft)
- Andrey Kurkov – The Silver Bone (MacLehose Press, 2024; HarperVia, 2024)
- Andrey Kurkov – The Stolen Heart (MacLehose Press, 2025; HarperVia, 2025)
- Vernon Duke – Passport to Paris and Los Angeles Poems (Paul Dry Books, 2025)
- Andrey Kurkov – The Lost Soldiers (MacLehose Press, 2026; HarperVia, 2026)
- Alexander Voloshin – Sidetracked: Exile in Hollywood (Paul Dry Books, 2026)

=== Poetry ===
- My Hollywood and Other Poems (Paul Dry Books, 2022)

=== Monograph ===
- Western Crime Fiction Goes East: The Russian Pinkerton Craze 1907-1934 (Brill, 2012)

=== Anthologies ===
- 1917: Stories and Poems from the Russian Revolution (Pushkin Press, 2016)
- The Penguin Book of Russian Poetry (Penguin Classics, 2015, co-edited with Robert Chandler and Irina Mashinski)
