= Dariusz Płatek =

Polish ice hockey player

- Born: July 26, 1966 (age 58); Sosnowiec, Poland
- Height: 5 ft 9 in (175 cm)
- Weight: 176 lb (80 kg; 12 st 8 lb)
- Position: Centre
- Shot: Left
- Played for: Zagłębie Sosnowiec; Unia Oświęcim
- National team: Poland
- Playing career: 1990–2001

Dariusz Płatek (born 26 July 1966) is a Polish former ice hockey player. He played for Zagłębie Sosnowiec and Unia Oświęcim during his career. He also played for the Polish national team at the 1992 Winter Olympics.
