= Dariusz Seliga =

Polish politician (born 1969)

member of Sejm 2005-2007
- In office 25 September 2005 – ?

Personal details
- Born: 10 April 1969 (age 57)
- Party: Law and Justice

Dariusz Michał Seliga (born 10 April 1969 in Skierniewice) is a Polish politician. He was elected to the Sejm on 25 September 2005, getting 5251 votes in 10 Piotrków Trybunalski district as a candidate from the Law and Justice list.

== See also ==
- Members of Polish Sejm 2005-2007
