= Dariusz Sikora =

Polish ice hockey player

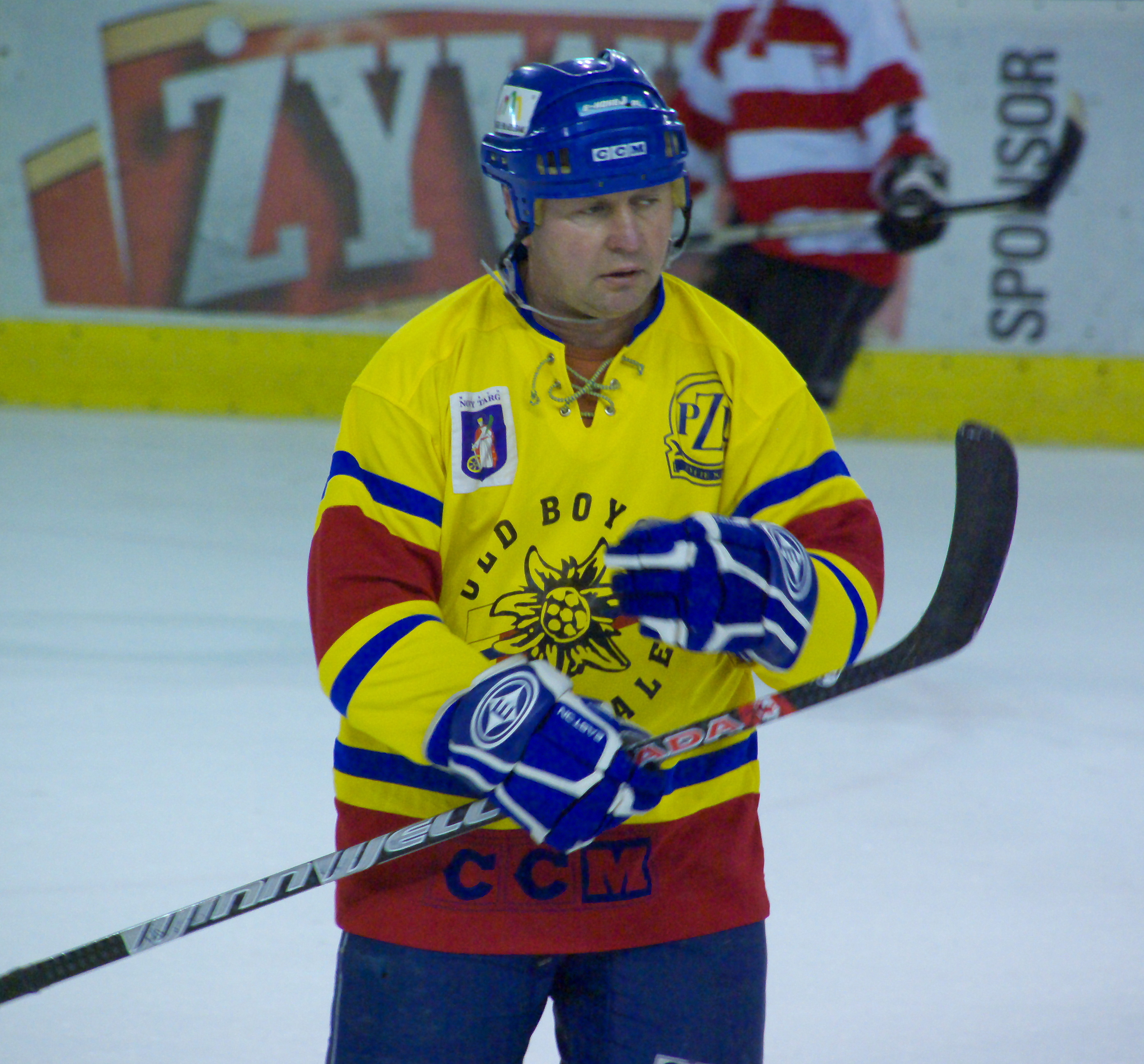
- Born: December 30, 1958 (age 66); Piekary Śląskie, Poland
- Height: 5 ft 9 in (175 cm)
- Weight: 161 lb (73 kg; 11 st 7 lb)
- Position: Centre
- Played for: Podhale Nowy Targ
- National team: Poland
- NHL draft: Undrafted
- Playing career: 1975–1980

Dariusz Klemens Sikora (born December 30, 1958) is a former Polish ice hockey player. He played for the Poland men's national ice hockey team at the 1980 Winter Olympics in Lake Placid.
