= Dariusz Wolny =

Dariusz Wolny may refer to:

- Dariusz Wolny (footballer) (born 1969), Polish footballer
- Dariusz Wolny (swimmer) (born 1960), Polish swimmer
