= Oleg Woolf =

Moldavian-Soviet writer

Oleg Woolf (1954–2011) was a Soviet and Moldovan writer. He trained as a physicist and went on several geophysical expeditions in the former USSR. He was married to Irina Mashinski; together they founded the bilingual press company Stosvet and its journal, Cardinal Points. As a writer, Woolf wrote short stories, essays, and poetry, and he was regularly published in literary journals and anthologies.

His books include:

- Vesnoj My Uvidim Sosnova (We Will See Sosnov in Spring) (New York: Stosvet Press, 2010)
- Bessarabskie marki (Bessarabian Stamps) (New Your: Stosvet Press, 2009), translated into English by Boris Dralyuk

Oleg Woolf died in the United States in 2011.
