= Dariusz Rekosz =

Polish writer

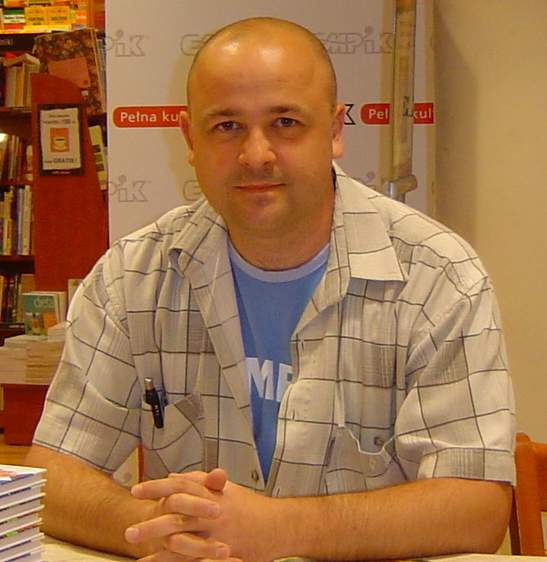
Dariusz Rekosz

Dariusz Rekosz (born 11 April 1970 in Sosnowiec, Poland) is a Polish author of books for children and teenagers, including Mors, Pinky, and the Secret of the Headmaster Fiszer, which began the series of “Mors, Pinky and...”.

Rekosz has also written Jan Matejko Code, a Polish parody of The Da Vinci Code. He has won a competition for Gdansk Crime Stories for his short story entitled The Secret of Neptune.
