= Cardinal Points =

Literary magazine published at Brown University

Cardinal Points is a bilingual annual literary magazine published in English and Russian by Slavic studies department of Brown University. It was founded by Oleg Woolf in 2010 to focus on the work of great 20th century writers Andrei Platonov, Varlam Shalamov, and Vassily Grossman. Its editors include Irina Mashinski, Robert Chandler and Boris Dralyuk.
