= Dariusz Garbocz =

Polish ice hockey player

- Born: January 11, 1971 (age 54); Katowice, Poland
- Height: 6 ft 0 in (183 cm)
- Weight: 225 lb (102 kg; 16 st 1 lb)
- Position: Defence
- Played for: GKS Tychy; KKH Katowice; VIK Västerås HK
- National team: Poland
- Playing career: 1989–2001

Dariusz Garbocz (born 11 January 1971), is a Polish former ice hockey player. He played for GKS Tychy, KKH Katowice, and VIK Västerås HK during his career. He also played for the Polish national team at the 1992 Winter Olympics.
