= Dariusz Jabłoński =

Dariusz Jabłoński may refer to:

- Dariusz Jabłoński (director)
- Dariusz Jabłoński (wrestler)
