= Dariusz Ulanowski =

Polish footballer

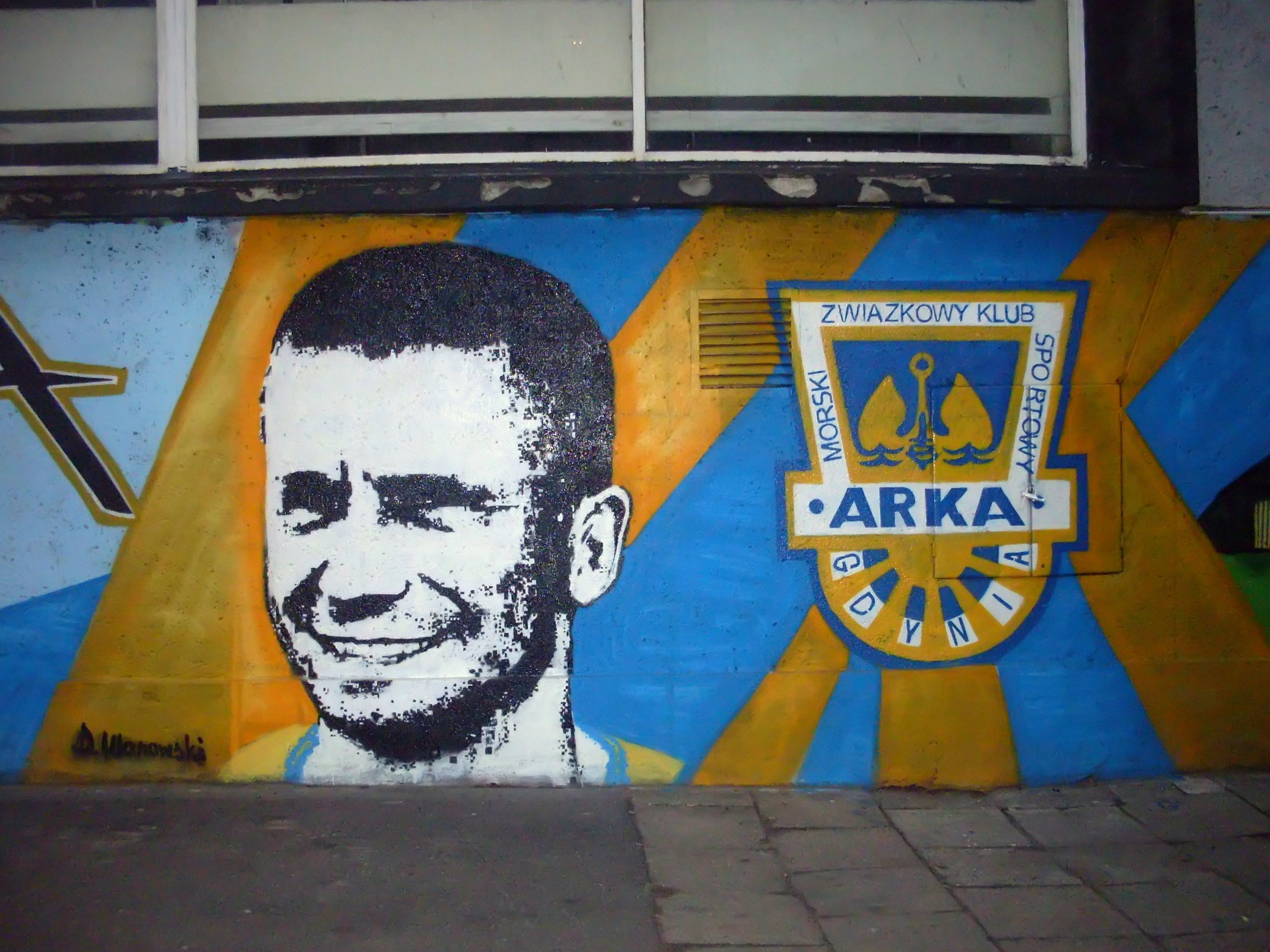
- Graffiti of Ulanowski and Arka Gdynia's crest at Józef Bem Street in Gdynia

Personal information
- Full name: Dariusz Ulanowski
- Date of birth: 3 March 1971 (age 55)
- Place of birth: Słupsk, Poland
- Height: 1.71 m (5 ft 7 in)
- Position: Midfielder

Team information
- Current team: Arka Gdynia II (manager)

Youth career
- Pomorze Potęgowo

Senior career*
Years	Team	Apps	(Gls)
1989–1990	Tęcza Nowa Wieś Lęborska		
1990–1991	Comindex Damnica		
1991–1994	Pogoń Lębork		
1994–2010	Arka Gdynia	380	(23)
2011	Pomorze Potęgowo	7	

Managerial career
- 2026–: Arka Gdynia II
- * Club domestic league appearances and goals

Dariusz Ulanowski (born 3 March 1971) is a Polish professional football manager and former player who played as a midfielder. He is currently in charge of Arka Gdynia's reserve team. He spent most of his professional career with Arka, and holds the all-time club record for the most appearances.

== Managerial statistics ==
As of match played 12 June 2026

Managerial record by team and tenure
Team	From	To	Record							
Team	From	To	G	W	D	L	GF	GA	GD	Win %
Arka Gdynia II	1 April 2026	Present	15	8	4	3	23	16	+7	53.33
Total			15	8	4	3	23	16	+7	53.33
