= Dariusz Kofnyt =

Polish footballer

Personal information
- Date of birth: 28 October 1964 (age 62)
- Place of birth: Poznań, Poland
- Height: 1.78 m (5 ft 10 in)
- Position: Midfielder

Youth career
- 1974–1981: Lech Poznań

Senior career*
Years	Team	Apps	(Gls)
1981–1995	Lech Poznań	202	(1)
1995–1996	Warta Poznań		
Total		+202	(+1)
- * Club domestic league appearances and goals

Dariusz Kofnyt (born 28 October 1964) is a Polish former professional footballer who played as a midfielder.

== Honours ==
Lech Poznań

- Ekstraklasa: 1983–84, 1989–90, 1991–92, 1992–93
- Polish Cup: 1983–84, 1987–88
- Polish Super Cup: 1990, 1992
