= Dariusz Zakrzewski =

Polish cyclist

Personal information
- Born: 18 June 1961 (age 65) Białystok, Poland

Cycling career
- Sport: Cycling
- Current team: Retired
- Discipline: Road
- Role: Rider

Major wins
- Conseil general de Val D'oisse (1991); Paris-Vaily-Classic; Paris-St. Mouve

Dariusz Zakrzewski (born 18 June 1961 in Białystok) is a Polish professional road racing cyclist. He was a third place on Tour de Pologne (1985), winner of French race Conseil general de Val D'oisse (1991) where he defeated later world champion, Laurent Brochard. In France he also won Paris-Vaily-Classic and Paris-St. Mouve races.

He was a member of following teams: Ognisko Białystok, Gwardia Katowice, VC Levallois and Corbeil Essonnes. On 25 March 1993 he officially ended his cycling career. Since 2000 Zakrzewski is a second technical director in CCC-Polsat team.
