= Dariusz Marcinkowski =

Polish field hockey player (born 1975)

Dariusz Marcinkowski (born 11 January 1975, in Środa Wielkopolska) is a Polish former field hockey player who competed in the 2000 Summer Olympics.
