= Foundation for Polish-German Reconciliation =

Polish foundation

The Foundation for Polish-German Reconciliation (polish: Fundacja „Polsko-Niemieckie Pojednanie“, German: Stiftung „Polnisch-Deutsche Aussöhnung“) is a Foundation according to Polish law and has its seat in the Polish capital Warsaw. It was founded in 1992 with the intention to establish an institution for ensuring efficient humanitarian aid to Polish victims of the Nazi-occupation and terror-rule. For these activities the foundation could use a financial budget pieced by different reparation payments to Poland, mainly form institutions financed by the German government and industry but also from Austria and various NGOs. These humanitarian aids financed by the reparation-budget were mainly paid out during the period from 1992-2005. Since that time the Foundation has permanently widened its activities. Currently there are four major fields of work:

- Humanitarian aid, including medical support for victims of Nazi-crimes during the occupation of Poland in World War II
- Historical education to improve the public knowledge about World War II, slave and forced labour (unfree labour) and the German occupation of Polish soil. Within this workfield, the foundation also organises permanent and non-permanent exhibitions in Germany and Poland. The foundation raised funds for the visitor centre at the Sobibór Museum.
- Encounter-programs that give students in Germany and Poland the opportunity to meet contemporary witnesses of the Nazi-period (During the summer-vacations groups from the USA join, too)
- A volunteer-program that allows volunteers from Germany and Poland to support the activities of the foundation, also in personal contact with victims by helping them in everyday life.
