= Dariusz Doliński =

Dariusz Antoni Doliński (born 1959) is a Polish psychologist.

He specialises in the psychology of social behaviour, including social influence, emotional psychology, and motivation. He is a lecturer at Szkoła Wyższa Psychologii Społecznej (SWPS), teaching social psychology and advertising psychology. He is an author of over 150 publications.

Doliński is the dean of the SWPS branch campus in Wrocław since March 2004. He received the grade of professor, as he worked as a scientific worker of The Institute of Psychology at the University of Opole. He is the editor-in-chief of Polish Psychological Bulletin, reviewer of European Journal of Social Psychology and Journal of Personality and Social Psychology, and a president of the Psychological Sciences Committee in the Polish Science Academy.
