= Grodzisk Mazowiecki Depot =

Train depot of the Warsaw Commuter Railway in Poland

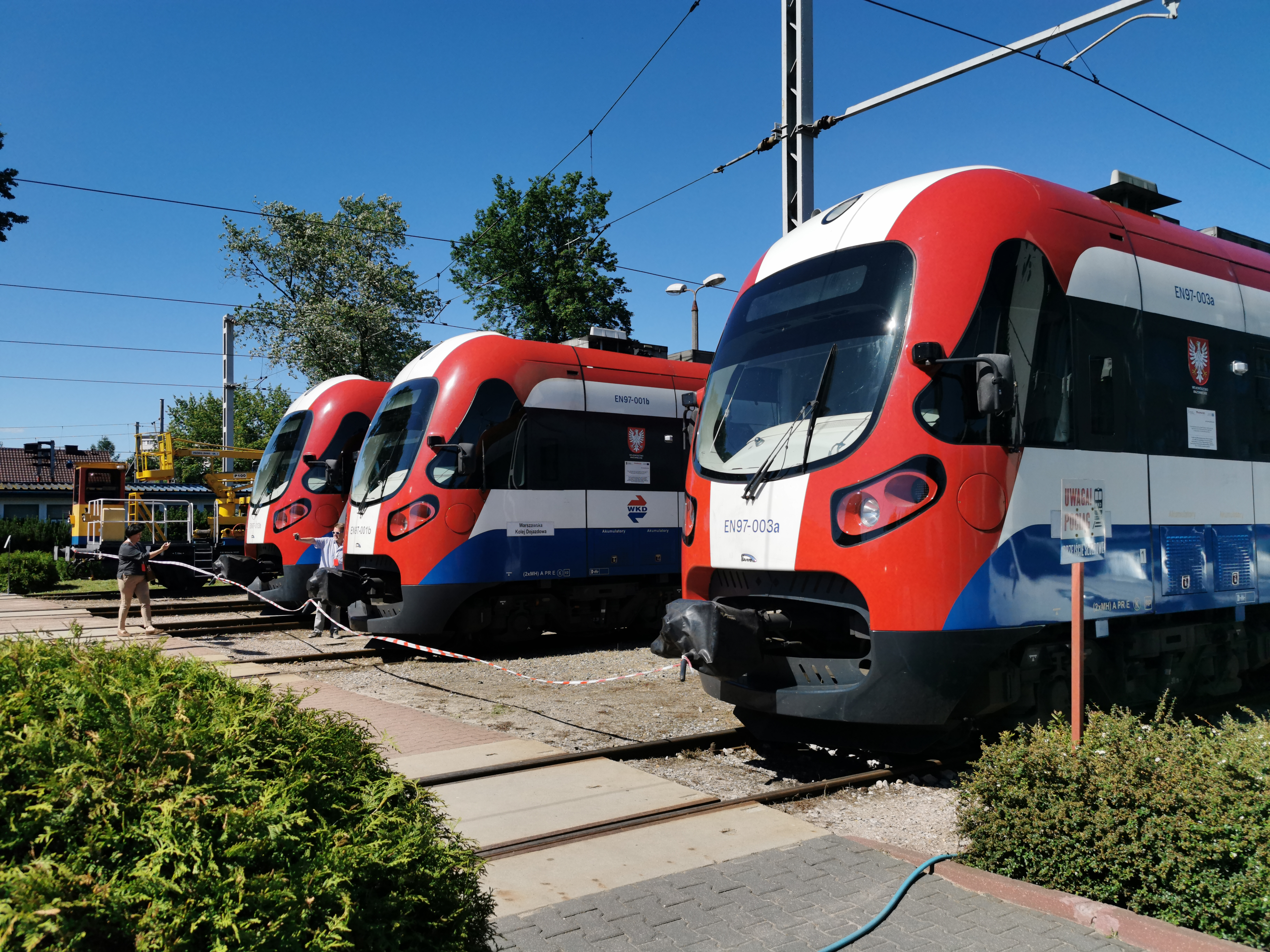
- Class EN97s stabled outside in June 2022
- Interactive map of Grodzisk Mazowiecki Depot

Location
- Location: Grodzisk Mazowiecki, Poland
- Coordinates: 52.1001°N 20.6308°E

Characteristics
- Owner: Warsaw Commuter Railway
- Type: Electric multiple units
- Rolling stock: Class EN95; Class EN97; Class EN100; Class SM32 (401Da) (Note: Used for shunting manoeuvres)

History
- Opened: 11 December 1927; 98 years ago

Grodzisk Mazowiecki Depot, simply Grodzisk Depot is the train maintenance depot of the Warsaw Commuter Railway in Poland. It is located adjacent to Grodzisk Mazowiecki Radońska railway station in Grodzisk Mazowiecki and has served as the depot since the railway's opening in 1927. It is also the headquarters of the operator.

== History ==
The depot opened together with the Electric Commuter Railways (EKD) on 11 December 1927; the depot later became part of the current Warsaw Commuter Railway (WKD) after it was nationalised in the 1930s. No original documentation of the depot survived World War II. It originally serviced and stabled class EN80s, where they were maintained and repaired. During World War II, destroyed EN80s where rebuilt at the depot. The class EN80 was withdrawn from service in 1972 after they were replaced by the class EN94. In 1993, EN80-16 was transported to Grodzisk Depot for a full restoration to be preserved. It was transported to ZNTK Bydgoszcz (now Pesa) for extensive restoration works. The restoration was completed in 1995, when it returned to the Grodzisk Depot. Further work was completed in 2002 by the museum, which was founded in the same year. A small locomotive shed was constructed for the EN80 at the depot.

In 1985, a new facility was constructed. The original 1927 building was subsequently reused for workshops and storage, it later became a museum on 11 December 2002.

== Museum ==
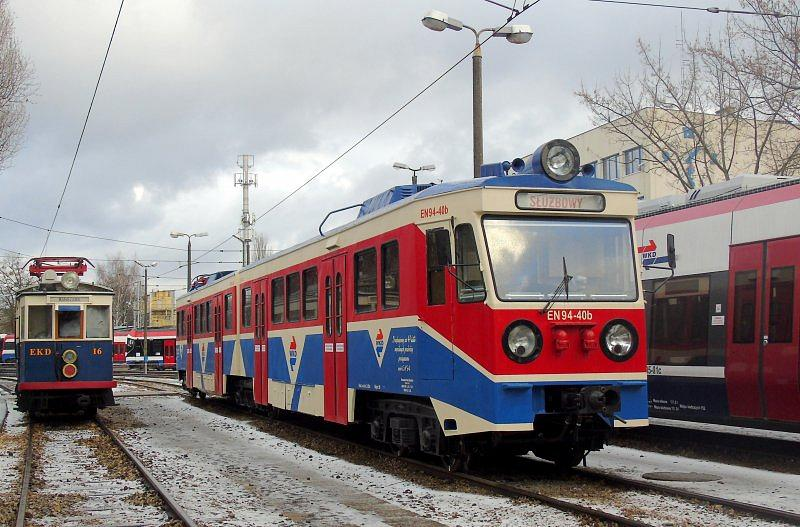
Preserved class EN80 (left) and class EN94 (right) at the depot grounds

The Tadeusz Gawroński EKD/WKD Tradition Chamber in Grodzisk Mazowiecki (Note: Polish: Izba Tradycji EKD/WKD im. Tadeusza Gawrońskiego w Grodzisku Mazowieckim) is a railway museum located in the original depot building from 1927. It originally opened on 11 December 2002 but was relocated to the 1927 depot building in 2022. The museum exhibits preserved WKD rolling stock, photographs, documents, tickets, scale models, and railway infrastructure. It is open to the public on Sundays.

The museum has the following rolling stock preserved:

- Class EN80-16
- Class EN94-40
- Class EN94-16 (driver's cab only)
