= PKP class EN100 =

Type of electric multiple unit used in Poland

PKP class EN100 Newag 39WE
- Class EN100 during a test run at the Żmigród test track in March 2016

- Interior of a class EN100
- Stock type: Electric multiple unit
- In service: 2016–present
- Manufacturer: Newag
- Assembly: Nowy Sącz, Poland
- Replaced: Class EN94
- Constructed: 2014–2016
- Number built: 6 trains
- Fleet numbers: 001–006
- Capacity: 505; 164 seated
- Operator: Warsaw Commuter Railway
- Depot: Grodzisk Mazowiecki Depot

Specifications
- Train length: 60.6 m (199 ft)
- Width: 2.85 m (9 ft 4 in)
- Height: 4.285 m (14.06 ft)
- Platform height: 500 mm (20 in)
- Doors: Double-leaf sliding plug (2 per side per car)
- Maximum speed: 100 km/h (62 mph)
- Engine type: Induction motor
- Power output: 1440 kW
- Acceleration: 1.2 m/s (3.9 ft/s)
- Electric system: 3 kV DC OLE
- Current collection: Pantograph
- Coupling system: Scharfenberg
- Track gauge: 1,435 mm (4 ft 8 1/2 in)

The PKP class EN100 (Note: Designated by Newag as the Newag 39WE.) is a type of standard-gauge electric multiple unit passenger train used by the Warsaw Commuter Railway in Poland. It was built by Newag between 2014 and 2016; the trains all entered service in 2016 replacing the class EN94.

Following a tender of new multiple units for WKD in late 2013, Newag won the contract. The first visualisation of the train was unveiled in April 2015, with the first unit ready in February 2016. The trains were delivered between April and August 2016, with EN100-01 the first to enter service on 28 May. The last unit was delivered in August.

The trains are formed of six cars, totalling to 60.6 m (199 ft) in length. They are powered by 3 kV DC overhead wires using pantographs. They are stabled and serviced at the Grodzisk Mazowiecki Depot. Their top speed is 100 km/h (62 mph) although they are limited to WKD's line speed of 80 km/h (50 mph).

== Background ==
On 29 November 2013, the Warsaw Commuter Railway (WKD) announced a tender for the construction of six new electric multiple units (EMU), which together included maintenance services during a six-month warranty period and staff training in operation and repairs. By 25 February 2014, both Newag and Pesa had submitted bids for the contract. As WKD's system had exceptionally tight curves (with a radius of 22 m (72 ft)), Newag could not offer trains from its Impuls family; the company had to design an entirely new train. A significant price difference between the two manufacturers necessitated further clarifications from the bidders, which extended the procurement process. On 23 May, WKD selected Newag as the manufacturer, prompting Pesa to file an appeal against this decision. Ultimately, on 18 June, the National Appeals Chamber dismissed the appeal, clearing the way for the EMUs to be built by Newag. The rolling stock and its introduction came at a total cost of 124.7 million PLN. 57.8 million of which was funded by the Swiss Contribution. In addition, the new trains would operate at 3 kV DC, which would require increasing the WKD network's traction voltage from 600 V DC to 3 kV DC.

== Construction ==
The concept of the train was developed in collaboration with EC Engineering, with the first visualisations unveiled in April 2015. According to the manufacturer, the train's design—featuring a large front windshield and robust covers for the crash energy absorbers—was intended to evoke the architecture of a "modern city". In response to feedback, WKD came to the decision in modifying the design of the train's front ends. Ultimately, it was decided to adjust the aesthetics of the front, which resulted in changes to the manufacturing process and in the rescheduling of delivery dates. Passengers soon gave the train the nicknames "Terminator", "Predator", and "Darth Vader" due to the train's resemblance. On 27 July 2015, a delivery contract was signed, stipulating that the first unit was to be delivered by 22 April 2016; the second and third by 15 May; the fourth by 22 July; and the final two by 22 August. The revised design of the train was also unveiled on 31 July. The modifications included the buffers, which were left more exposed than in the original concept.

== Delivery ==
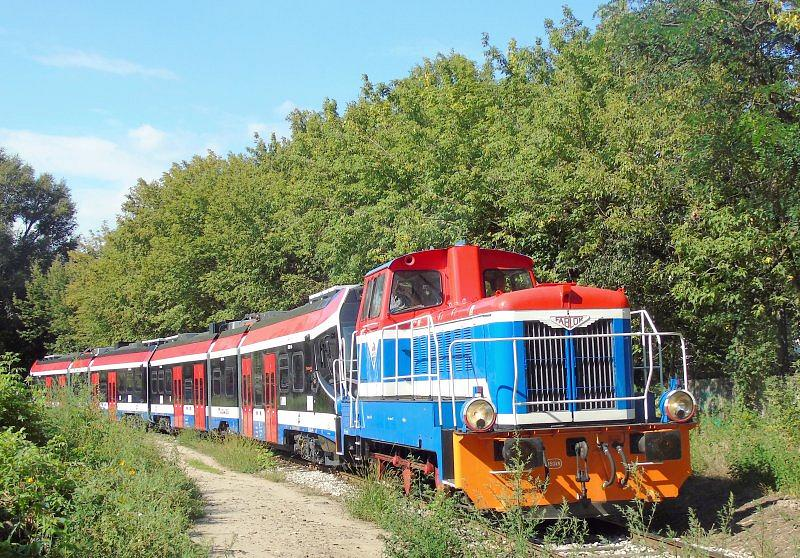
Delivery of EN100-06 to Grodzisk Mazowiecki Depot in August 2016

The first unit was completed in February 2016, where it was transported to the Żmigród test track on 24 February for testing and evaluations to obtain authorisation for service entry. At that time, it was estimated that these tests would continue until the second half of March. Subsequently, the trains underwent testing at the "Grybów Loop" of the Tarnów–Leluchów railway near Grybów. On 18 March, the first unit drove with its own power to the Railway Institute in Warsaw for further testing required for operational certification. On the night of 31 March and 1 April, it was transported to the Grodzisk Mazowiecki Depot of WKD to undergo loading gauge testing. After also being tested for its performance on curves and sidings at the depot, the train returned to Newag's factory in Nowy Sącz that same day. On 25 April, the unit underwent a test run between Pruszków and Koluszki, which included, among other things, braking distance measurements. The following day, the train returned to the depot, where it awaited to undergo further testing on WKD—under 3 kV DC power—to evaluate additional parameters, such as electricity consumption. On 29 April, the Office of Rail Transport (UTK) issued an indefinite authorisation for the operation of the first class EN100; it was formally accepted by WKD for operation that same day. On the night of 30 April and 1 May, unit 001 was tested under the newly implemented 3 kV DC power at the depot; it entered service on 28 May. The class EN94 was subsequently fully withdrawn from service on 27 May. On 10 May, the UTK authorised units 002 and 003 for service, and by mid-May, in accordance with the delivery schedule, they were delivered to the depot. In early June, Newag announced that the contract could potentially be completed in July—one month ahead of the original deadline. Despite this, the sixth and final train was delivered on the night of 19 and 20 August, entering service on 24 August.

== Specification ==
Driver's cab

Trains consist of two three-car sections supported by three bogies. The floor is low-level to match with WKD station's platform height. The first and third cars of each section are equipped with two pairs of double-leaf sliding plug doors.

Each trainset has a total capacity of 505 passengers, including 164 seated—of which 32 are folding seats—with some seats arranged longitudinally. There are four spaces for wheelchairs and eight for bicycles. The train also features air conditioning (complemented by windows that allow for natural ventilation), CCTV, a passenger counting system, LED and LCD passenger information systems, and ticket machines. Ramps are provided at the wheelchair spaces to facilitate boarding. The driver's cab features a control console that wraps around the driver's seat, allowing for better visibility of objects located close to the front of the train.

70% of the components used in the vehicles are of Polish origin. The propulsion system and inverters were manufactured in Warsaw, while other parts were produced in Nowy Sącz. The trainsets include an electronic version of its Maintenance System Documentation and are equipped with external CCTV systems that include event recording.

== Operation ==
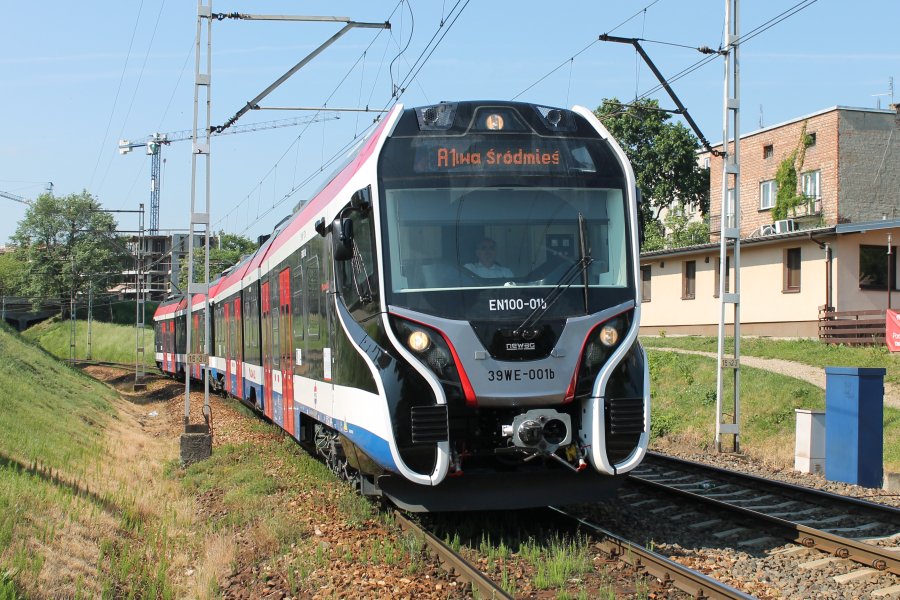
Class EN100 approaches Pruszków WKD in May 2016

Total	Unit	Delivered	Entered service	Ref
6	EN100-01	31 March/1 April 2016	28 May 2016	
6	EN100-02	14/15 May 2016	29 May 2016	
6	EN100-03	14/15 May 2016	29 May 2016	
6	EN100-04	30 June/1July 2016	7 July 2016	
6	EN100-05	4/5 August 2016	9 August 2016	
6	EN100-06	19/20 August 2016	24 August 2016	

Since its opening in 1927, the WKD network had been electrified with a 600 V DC traction power supply. To match with the standard electrification system used across most of Poland's mainline railway network, the new class EN100s were designed to operate at 3 kV DC. Consequently, their introduction into service required the entire WKD network's traction voltage to be increased from 600 V DC to 3 kV DC. This change made the existing class EN94 incompatible with the network's new electrification (as it was powered by a 600 V DC traction supply), forcing its withdrawal from service on 17 May 2016.

Ceremonial introduction of the class EN100 at Grodzisk Mazowiecki Radońska on 1 July 2016

On 1 March, WKD announced that the increasing of the traction voltage, and the service introduction of the first class EN100, would take place in early May. Ultimately however, on 19 April, the date for the traction voltage increasing and the introduction of the new trains was rescheduled to 28 May. The last nine class EN94s were withdrawn from service on 27 May. On 28 May, at 5:03 AM, EN100-01 entered passenger service, operating its first service; train number 2202 from Grodzisk Mazowiecki Radońska to Podkowa Leśna Główna. The following day, units 002 and 003 also entered service. During the initial days of operation, no major issues were reported with the trains; the only faults involved malfunctions in the passenger information system. On 3 June, a formal presentation and the ceremonial introduction of the first train (EN100-01) took place, featuring a promotional journey from Warszawa Śródmieście WKD to Grodzisk. Subsequently, EN100-04 entered passenger service on 8 July, followed by EN100-05 on 9 August, and EN100-06 on 24 August.

== See also ==
- Warsaw Commuter Railway
- PKP class EN94, the predecessor of the class EN100 (1972–2016)
