= PKP class EN80 =

Tram formerly operated by Warsaw Commuter Railway

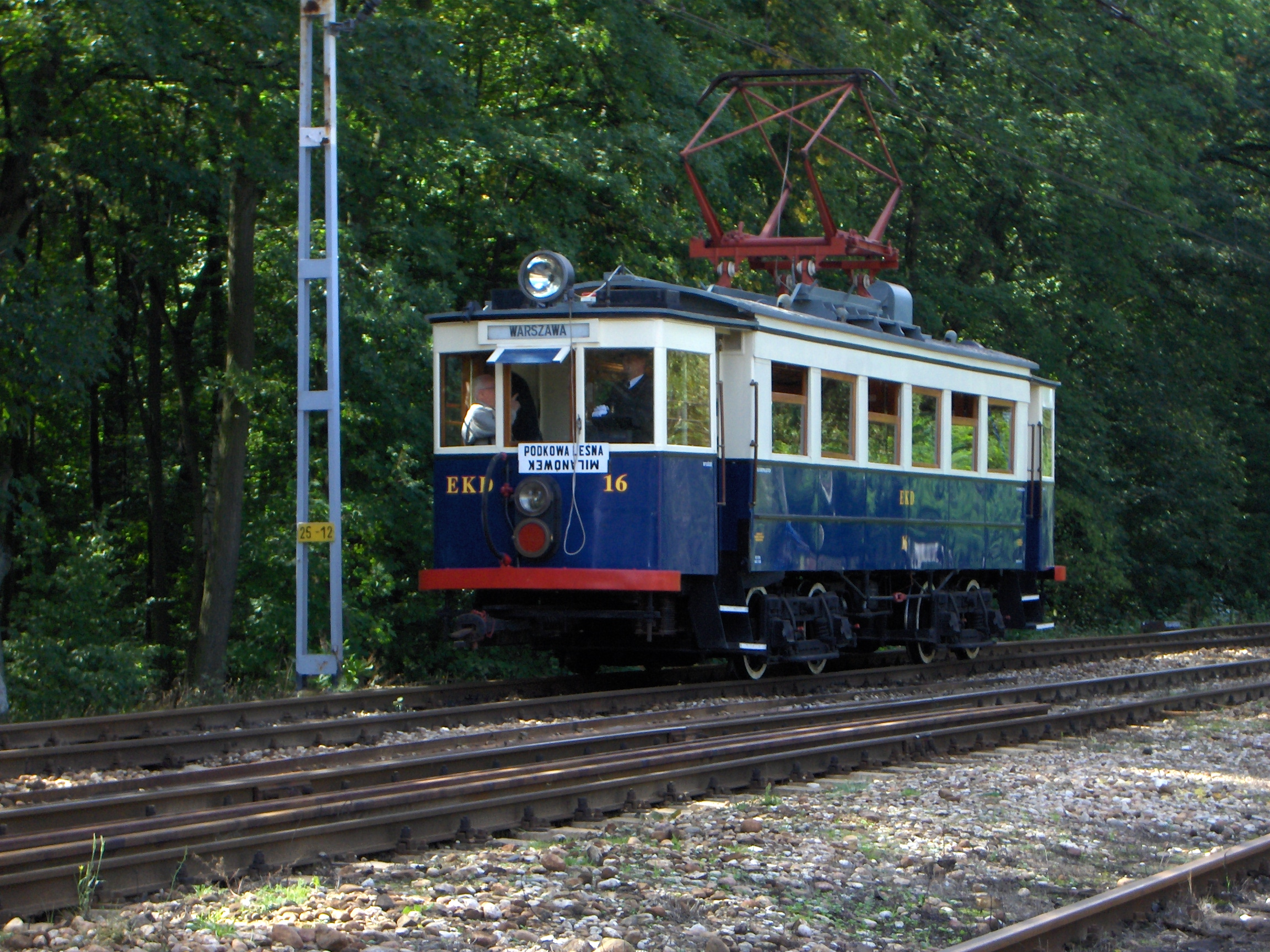
- A preserved EN80 near Podkowa Leśna
- Stock type: Electric railcar
- In service: 1927 – 1972
- Manufacturers: English Electric (1927); Konstal (1948)
- Assembly: Preston, England (1927)
- Constructed: 1927, 1948
- Entered service: 1927–1972
- Number built: 52
- Successor: Class EN97
- Capacity: 68 (railcar); 77 (trailer)
- Operator: Warsaw Commuter Railway

Specifications
- Train length: 13,400 mm (530 in)
- Width: 2,250 mm (89 in)
- Height: 3,327 mm (131.0 in)
- Wheel diameter: 851 mm (33.5 in)
- Maximum speed: 85
- Weight: Railcar: 23.1 t (25.5 short tons); Trailer: 14.1 t (15.5 short tons)
- Engine type: English Electric: DK-31; Konstal Chorzów: Crompton C-123
- Power output: English Electric: 4×36 kW; Konstal Chorzów: 4×45 kW
- Electric system: 600 V DC
- Braking system: Electric Kunze–Knorr brakes
- Seating: 38
- Track gauge: Standard gauge

The PKP class EN80 was a series of standard-gauge electric railcars and trailers operated by the Warsaw Commuter Railway from 1927 to 1972. 20 railcars and trailers were built in 1927 by English Electric. They were all repaired by Konstal after World War II, with the addition of 12 new trailers to the fleet.

== Genesis and production ==
After the Warsaw Commuter Railway (WKD), then known as the Electric Commuter Railway, was built in the 1920s, the owners of the railway turned to English Electric, a British company, in order to produce the first standard-gauge tram to serve this route, as this was the first standard-gauge railway in Poland and no Polish trains could serve on it due to the gauge discrepancy.

English Electric complied. In 1927, it built 20 railcars and 20 trailers for the WKD. They were delivered to Poland before the line was opened, on 11 December 1927. After World War II, the rolling stock was rebuilt by Konstal in Chorzów. This was accompanied by 12 new trailers, built in 1948. The new EN80s were equipped with 45kW engines.

== Design ==
EN80 series trams were built of oak and pine timber. The interiors were composed of large oak benches, with a total capacity of 38 passengers. They were accompanied by small tables. The electric railcars included cabs on both sides, equipped with basic equipment.

Each of the EN80 railcars was equipped with two bogies. The wheels on the train had a diameter of 851 mm (33.5 in). The tram relied on overhead lines to provide a supply of 600 V of electricity through its pantograph.

== Service history ==
The railcars, arriving on 11 December 1927 in Poland, served the route from Warsaw to Grodzisk Mazowiecki, as well as the slower routes to Włochy and Milanówek, built in the 1930s. Prior to the start of World War II, the WKD became increasingly crowded. In 1939, WKD railcars carried a daily load of 40,000 passengers. Although most EN80s remained operational throughout the war, during the Warsaw Uprising and the Red Army's approach to Warsaw, General Government authorities began destroying units en masse. After the war had ended, by 16 May 1945, only 25 EN80s remained.

In order to fill the gap left in the EN80 fleet by the destruction, in 1948, Konstal's factory in Chorzów built 12 new trailers; all existing EN80s were also rebuilt. In 1951, after the WKD was rebranded, it had 20 railcars and 30 trailers in its inventory. The introduction of the Pafawag 101Na in 1972 resulted in the rapid retirement of EN80 trains; the last railcar was retired on 1 March 1973. One railcar, EN-16s, remains in the WKD's headquarters.

== See also ==
- Warsaw Commuter Railway § Rolling stock
- Pafawag 101N
