= PKP class EN94 =

Tram formerly operated by Warsaw Commuter Railway

PKP class EN94 Pafawag 101N
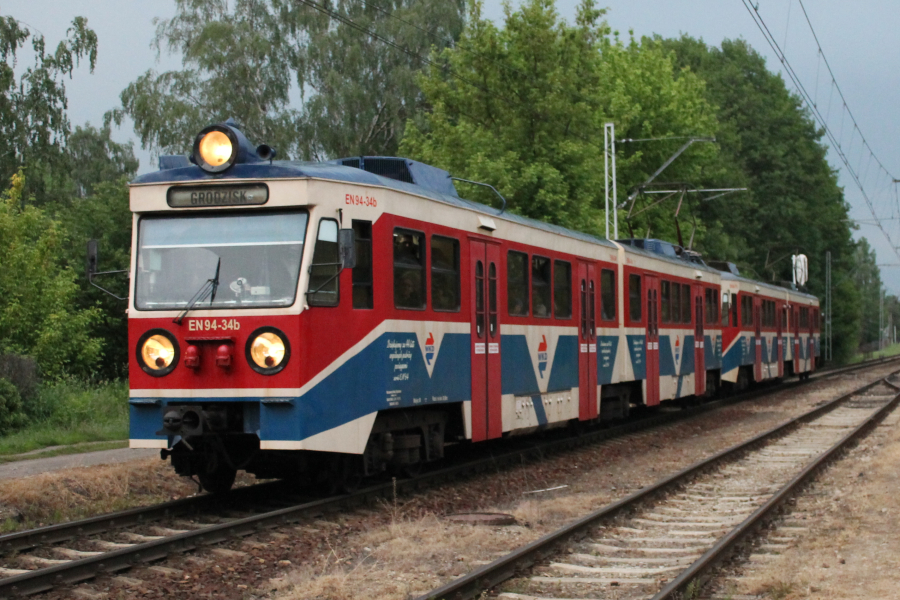
- A Pafawag 101N at Grodzisk Mazowiecki
- Stock type: Electric multiple unit
- In service: 1972–2016
- Manufacturer: Pafawag
- Constructed: 1968–1972
- Number built: 40
- Number preserved: 4 units
- Predecessor: Class EN80
- Successor: Class EN95; Class EN97; Class EN100
- Capacity: 250
- Operator: Warsaw Commuter Railway

Specifications
- Train length: 27,800 mm (1,090 in)
- Width: 2,620 mm (103 in)
- Height: 3,600 mm (140 in)
- Wheel diameter: 850 mm (33 in)
- Maximum speed: 80 km/h (50 mph)
- Weight: 44.1 t (48.6 short tons)
- Prime mover: LKc-310
- Tractive effort: 226kW
- Transmission: Single sided spur gear, 60:17 ratio
- Acceleration: 0.9 m/s^{2}
- Electric system: 600 V DC
- Braking system: Oerlikon air brake
- Seating: 80

The PKP class EN94 (Note: Designated by Pafawag as the Pafawag 101N.) was a two-car, low-floor electric multiple unit (EMU) tram produced by Pafawag in Wrocław from 1968 to 1972. A total of 40 101Ns were built for the Warsaw Commuter Railway.

== Origins, construction and prototypes ==
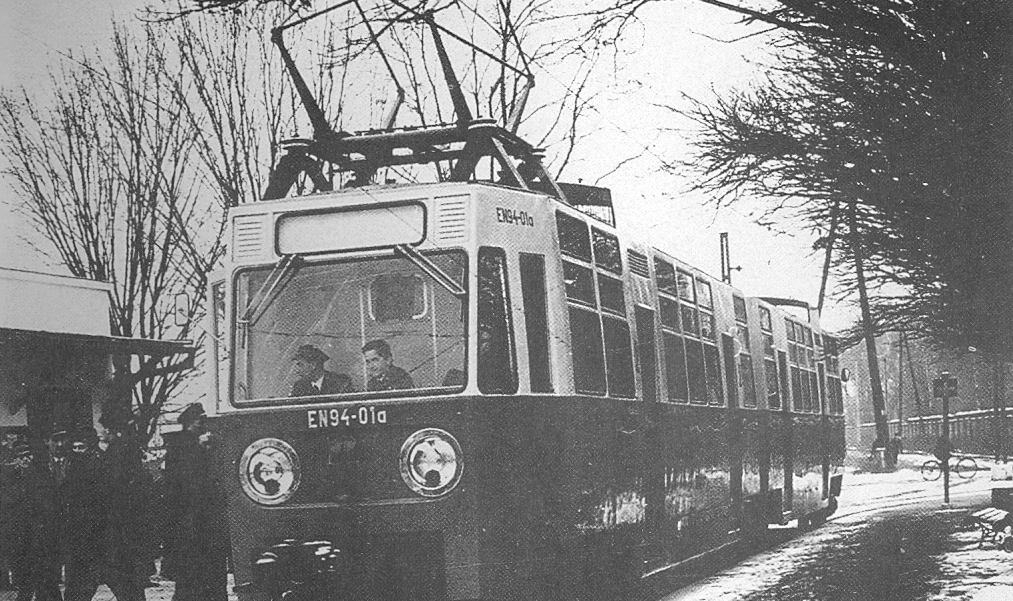
The prototype 101N unit at Grodzisk Mazowiecki Radońska (circa 1968–69)

In the 1960s, because of growing car traffic in the city, Warsaw city authorities began an extensive modernization of the transit system. This included the introduction of new rolling stock to the Warsaw Commuter Railway (Polish: Warszawska Kolej Dojazdowa, WKD). Because of the cost of importing foreign trains, it was decided the rolling stock would be produced domestically.

After a set of specifications for the rolling stock were outlined by the Railway Institute in Warsaw, through 1964, plans were drawn up by the Institute of Rail Vehicles "Tabor" and Institute of Industrial Design. After numerous models were produced, in 1965, Pafawag's factory in Wrocław was assigned to complete the planning and build the rolling stock.

In June 1968, as the planning stage was finished, an initial prototype was built. This prototype, compared to the interwar-era rolling stock, had double the acceleration speed and double the capacity. A new prototype, EN94-01, the first tram of the type 101N, was tested on WKD tracks in the fourth quarter of 1968. The tests on these tracks ended at the start of April 1969, but would resume in Grodzisk Mazowiecki and Wrocław until 27 May.

EN94-01 was bought by WKD in June, and it was entered into inventory on 1 July, though it was recalled after travelling nearly 40,000 km (25,000 mi) because of issues with the bogies. It returned to service in December 1969. Between 1969 and 1970, the 101N garnered large amounts of criticism, and in 1970, Pafawag decided to modernize the 101N. In order to collect complaints and suggestions from riders, Pafawag used multiple methods, including a public survey. As a result of these changes, the 101N was lengthened by 1,000 mm (39 in) and each of the doors was widened by 250 mm (9.8 in), along with interior changes.

With these changes, a new variant of the 101N, the 101Na, was built and began construction in 1971. The first 101Na, named EN94-02, was displayed at the Poznań International Fair in June 1971. Between April and December 1971, the rest of the 101Nas requested by WKD, numbering 38, were produced and rolled out, allowing for the withdrawal of all interwar EN80 trams.

== Design ==
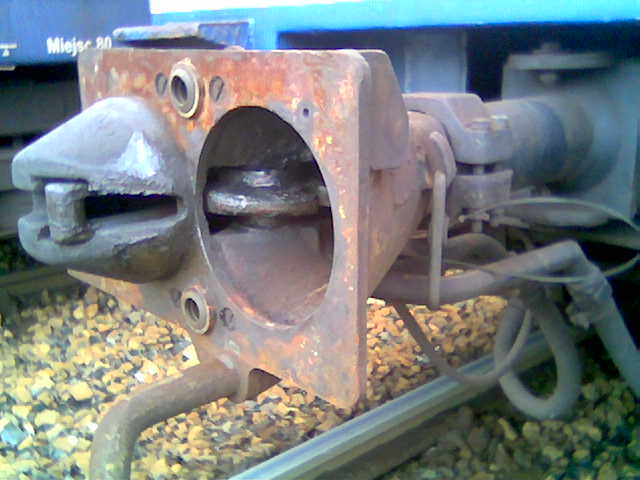
A coupler on a 101N railcar

A 101N electric multiple unit consisted of 2 railcars, each connected by a service aisle. The cars had couplers (specifically Scharfenberg couplers) attached to them, allowing them to form trainsets, as well as electrical couplers, allowing for multiple-unit train control. The trams of this series were also designed to navigate the curves commonly found on the WKD's routes.

Every EN94 railcar consisted of a driver's cab and a passenger compartment. The cabin was fully separated from the passenger compartment, and was only accessible via an external door. The driver's cab included full control equipment, and had a large window at the front.

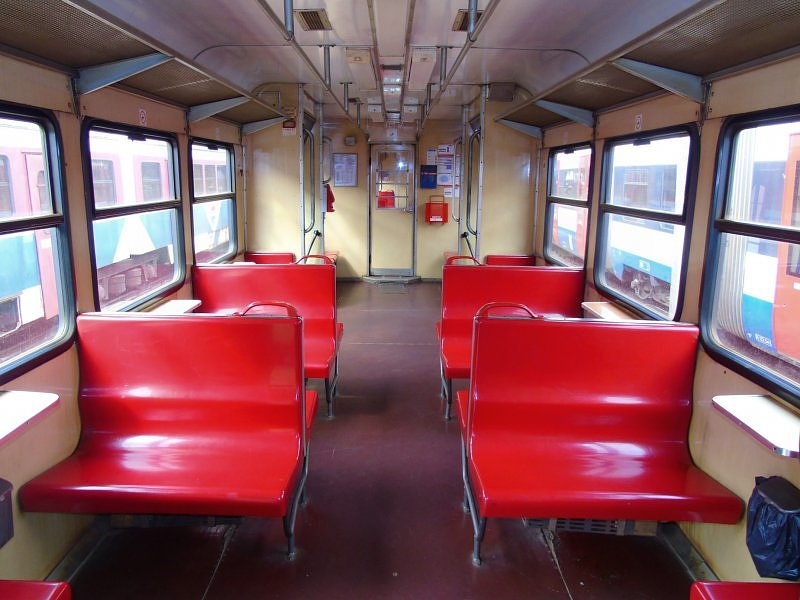
The 101N's interior

The passenger compartment consisted of multiple rows of two 2-person seats, with a 656 mm (25.8 in) wide aisle in between. Single seats were located near the doors, while 4-person seats were located at the rear of the car. Hand luggage compartments ran along the length of the car, above the seats. Trash cans and tables were located between rows of seats.

== Service history ==
EN94-01, the first 101N tram to be introduced, initially operated between 1969 and 1970. It was nicknamed "the Greenhouse" because of the very large windows. In order to make it fit in with the other 101Nas, delivered to WKD in 1972, it was rebuilt and wrecked numerous times before eventually being scrapped in 1989.

The WKD used the EN94s intensely, and by 1982, most units had a mileage of over 1,000,000 kilometres (620,000 mi). Although it was planned for the trains to undergo repairs as soon as 1984, these repairs only began in 1990 due to multiple delays. That year, the first 4 EN94s were sent to Zakłady Naprawcze Taboru Kolejowego in Bydgoszcz (today Pesa) for repairs.

The repairs began in 1990 and would continue until 1994, with batches of 9 to 11 trams being sent every year for repair. The final trams to be repaired were EN94-25 and EN94-26, which were repaired by 21 December 1994. Major changes were made during the repairs, including to the doors, driver's cab, electrical couplers, and the colour scheme, which was made much brighter.

=== Retirement ===
In 2005, the Pesa Mazovia, series EN95, was introduced into service, and EN94s began being phased out. Between 2005 and 2009, 8 EN94s were retired. The retirement of EN94s preceded rather slowly (only 1 was retired between 2009 and 2012) before the Pesa 33WE, series EN97, was introduced in January 2012.

In 2012, EN94s began being rapidly retired. By August 2012, 13 EN94s had been retired or sold, and 3 more would be retired throughout the rest of the year. By the end of 2012, WKD had 25 EN94s. None of these trams were retired in 2013, although there were 3 retired in 2014. Even more were retired or scrapped in 2015, with only 9 units left by October 2015. 1 of them, EN94-23, was in reserve.

In February 2016, it was announced that, with the introduction of the new Newag 39WE trains, series EN100, which used a 3000 V DC electrification system (in contrast to the EN94's 4000 V DC system), the electrification system would have to be changed by May 2016 to 3000 V DC. As such, all EN94s had to be retired to make way for this change within the year. On 27 May, all 9 remaining 101Nas were retired, ending the EN94's 44-year-long run.

== See also ==
- Pafawag
- Bombardier Transportation Polska
- EN80
