= European Rail Research Advisory Council =

The European Rail Research Advisory Council (ERRAC) is a European Seventh Framework Programme initiative to improve the competitive situation of the European Union to revitalise the European rail sector.

The programme is a joint initiative (Public-Private Partnership) of the European Commission, representing the European Communities, and the industry. The main objective of EuMaT is to produce a Strategic Research Agenda. The European Rail Research Advisory Council presented its Strategic Rail Research Agenda (SRRA) to the railway community on 18 December 2002. Chairman of ERRAC is Åke Wennberg of Bombardier Transportation.

== See also ==
- European Technology Platform
- Joint Technology Initiative
