= PKP class EN95 =

Electric multiple unit produced in 2004 by Pesa for the Warsaw Commuter Railway

PKP class EN95 Pesa Mazovia (13WE)
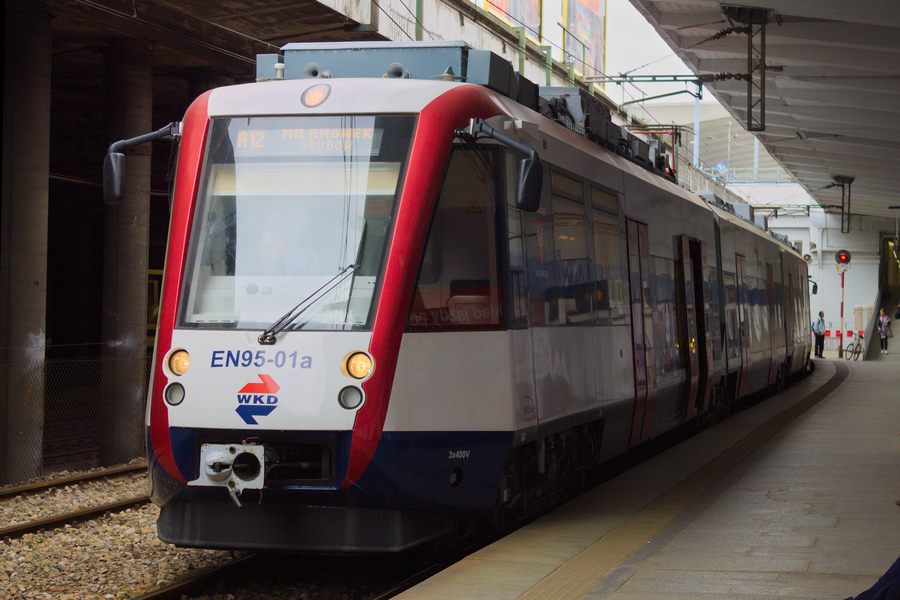
- EN95-01 at the Warszawa Śródmieście WKD railway station (2016)
- Stock type: Electric multiple unit
- Manufacturer: Pesa Bydgoszcz
- Assembly: Bydgoszcz, Poland
- Constructed: 2004
- Predecessor: Class EN94
- Capacity: 500; 150 seated

Specifications
- Train length: 60,000 millimetres (200 ft)
- Width: 2,850 millimetres (9.35 ft)
- Height: 3,930 millimetres (12.89 ft)
- Platform height: 600 millimetres (2.0 ft)
- Wheel diameter: 840 millimetres (2.76 ft) (driving) 720 millimetres (2.36 ft) (trailing)
- Maximum speed: 90 kilometres per hour (56 mph)
- Weight: 102 kilograms (225 lb)
- Engine type: DKLBZ0910-04
- Cylinder count: 4×280 kW
- Power output: 600/3,000 V DC
- Electric system: 1,120 kW
- AAR wheel arrangement: s+d+d+s
- Braking system: SAB-Wabco

The PKP class EN95, also known as the Pesa Mazovia (Note: Designated by Pesa as the Pesa 13WE.) is a standard-gauge, four-car electric multiple unit produced in 2004 by Pesa from Bydgoszcz in a single unit for the Warsaw Commuter Railway. It is the first vehicle of this kind built by the manufacturer.

The train is colloquially referred to as the pearl (Polish: perła), the pear (Polish: gruszka), or the doll (Polish: lalunia).

== History ==
=== Origins ===
After World War II, electric multiple units in Poland were produced solely by Pafawag in Wrocław until 1997. Pafawag manufactured, among others, the most popular electric multiple unit in Poland, the EN57 series. After privatization in the 1990s, the factory ceased production of these types of vehicles, with the last unit being the ED73 in 1997. At that time, Polish State Railways ended orders for new rolling stock, including electric multiple units.

From the late 1980s, Polish State Railways, and from the early 21st century also local governments, mainly purchased diesel railcars and diesel multiple units, as fuel-consuming locomotives dominated the service on non-electrified lines. This allowed Polish manufacturers and operators to gain experience in the production and operation of lightweight rolling stock. Additionally, the existing EN57 series electric multiple units operated by Polish carriers were modernized.

In the early 21st century, new manufacturers like Pesa Bydgoszcz, Newag, and Stadler began to appear on Polish railways with their electric multiple units. Following a deep restructuring between 1998 and 2000, Pesa, then still known as Zakłady Naprawcze Taboru Kolejowego w Bydgoszczy, started producing railbuses in January 2001. Building on experience from constructing these vehicles and refurbishing electric multiple units, the company undertook the challenge of creating its first self-designed electric multiple unit.

=== Tender and order fulfillment ===
In the early 21st century, Warsaw Commuter Railway operated 35 units of the EN94 series. At that time, this over 30-year-old rolling stock was not sufficiently comfortable and did not meet transport needs. Therefore, on 25 April 2003, the Masovian Voivodeship government announced an open tender for the delivery of one electric multiple unit for this operator. Ten rolling stock manufacturers requested the tender documentation, and by June 5, only Pesa and Poznań Railway Repair Plant submitted their bids. Pesa's offer was deemed more favorable, and on June 25, a contract worth 10.4 million PLN was signed.

Between 2003 and 2004, a comprehensive design project for the vehicle, along with execution documentation, was developed by the Marad Design studio team. For the design of the vehicle's appearance, they collaborated with Studio 1:1. The main designers were Marek Adamczewski, Magdalena Berlińska, and Jarosław Szymański, supported by Jakub Gołębiewski, Mariusz Gorczyński, Agnieszka John, Tomasz Kozioróg, Emilia Lebiedź, and Jacek Poćwiardowski. The design of the unit was inspired by electric multiple units produced until 1990. Three front-end design proposals were created, with one selected. Before the actual train production began, a 1:1 scale mock-up of the final front end was created at the design studio of the Gdańsk Academy of Fine Arts.

On 28 June 2004, the prototype vehicle type 13WE was completed and delivered to Warsaw two days later. After testing the running gear, the train was sent to Grodzisk Mazowiecki for further tests. From July 1 to August 25, trial runs were conducted on the Warsaw Commuter Railway route, and on August 26, the Office of Rail Transport issued a temporary operational approval certificate. The next day, a demonstration run for journalists was held, and on August 29, in Grodzisk, the train marked EN95-01 was officially handed over for use. At the time, it was the first single-space trainset on the Warsaw Commuter Railway.

=== End of production and related vehicles ===
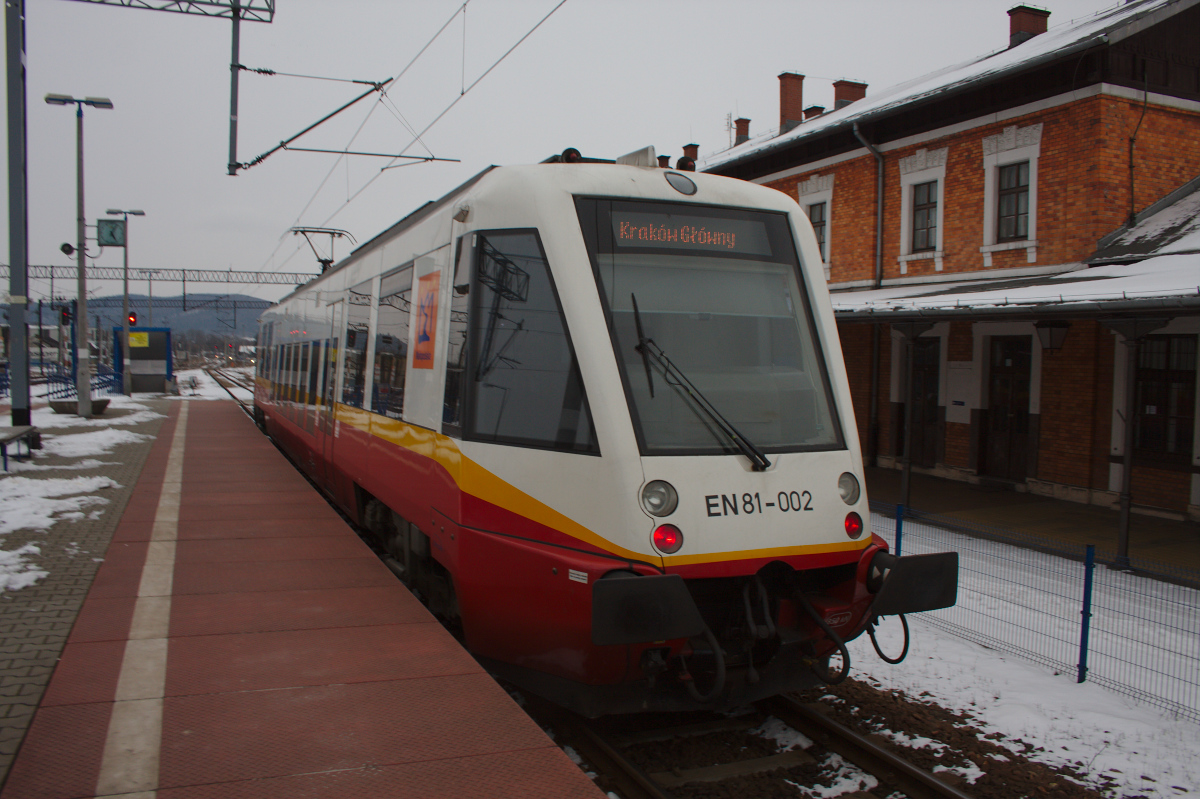
Type 308B car

In summer 2004, during the testing of EN95-01, there were plans to build nine more units of this series if the prototype proved successful. These units were intended to replace the EN94 series by 2006. After 2005, Warsaw Commuter Railway's rolling stock plans changed, and on 27 May 2009, a tender for 14 trainsets with similar parameters was announced, but with fewer seating requirements and dual-system capabilities due to planned voltage changes on the Warsaw Commuter Railway network. The October 9 tender was canceled due to budget issues, and a new one was announced on November 5. This time, the order was for 14 units without the single-space design. Pesa won again with a new train type, 33WE. The purchase agreement was signed on 26 March 2010.

The manufacturer claimed that it was possible to build Mazovia adapted to any power supply voltage, but no other orders for such a vehicle were placed, and ultimately, only one unit was produced for the Warsaw Commuter Railway.

In 2005, Pesa, using the experience from building the 13WE unit and its solutions, constructed the first Polish electric motor coach type 308B. The new vehicle had identical front walls and driver's cabs as the 13WE unit, and the central part with a lowered floor between the bogies was designed in the same way.

== Construction ==
=== Car body ===
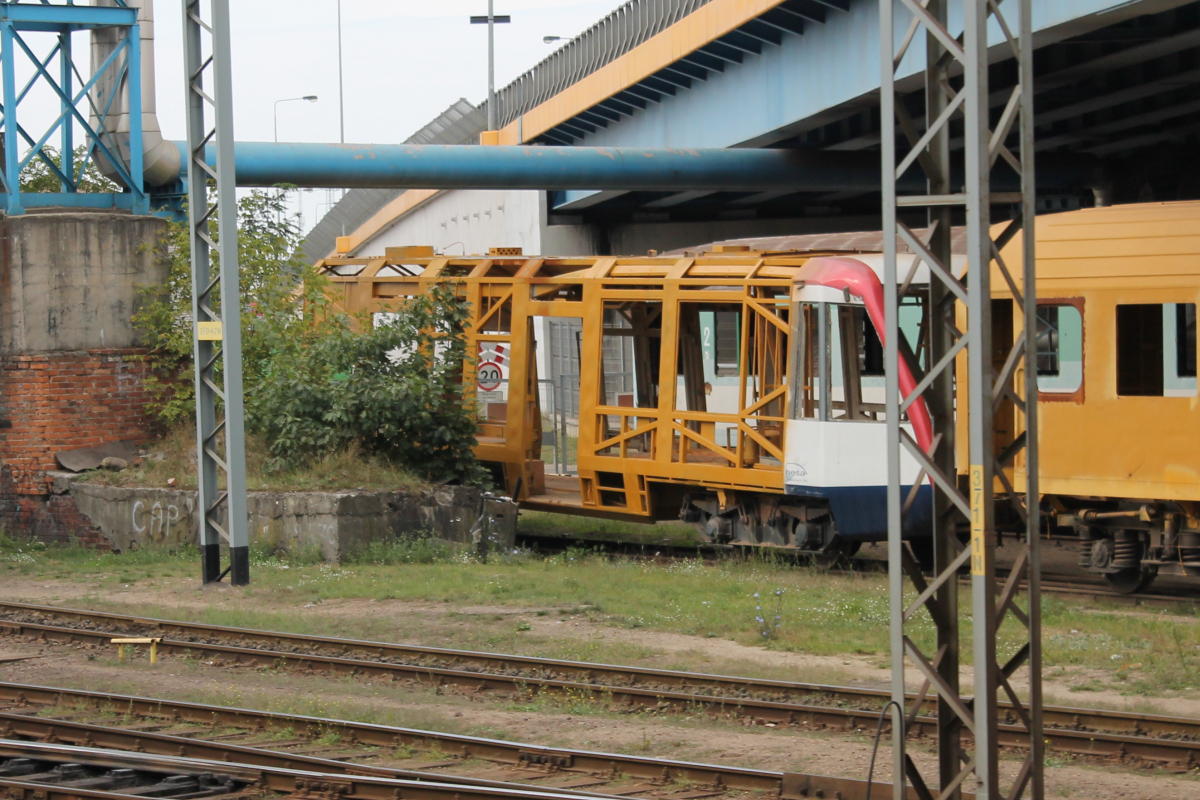
Vehicle's car body during repair (2014)

The Mazovia is a four-car, single-space, partially low-floor electric multiple unit designed for urban passenger transport. Its car body consists of a welded steel frame and bonded aluminum panels. The structure, classified under durability category P III, features controlled crumple zones.

Each car has two pairs of double-leaf sliding plug doors with a 1,300 mm opening on each side. The doors can be operated centrally or individually using buttons. The windows are made of sun-protective glass, and all windows, except those near the doors, have a tilting upper part.

The vehicle is equipped with Scharfenberg couplers from Voith, with a coupling axis height of 930 mm above the railhead. The train is not capable of multiple-unit operation but can be towed in emergency mode.

=== Interior ===
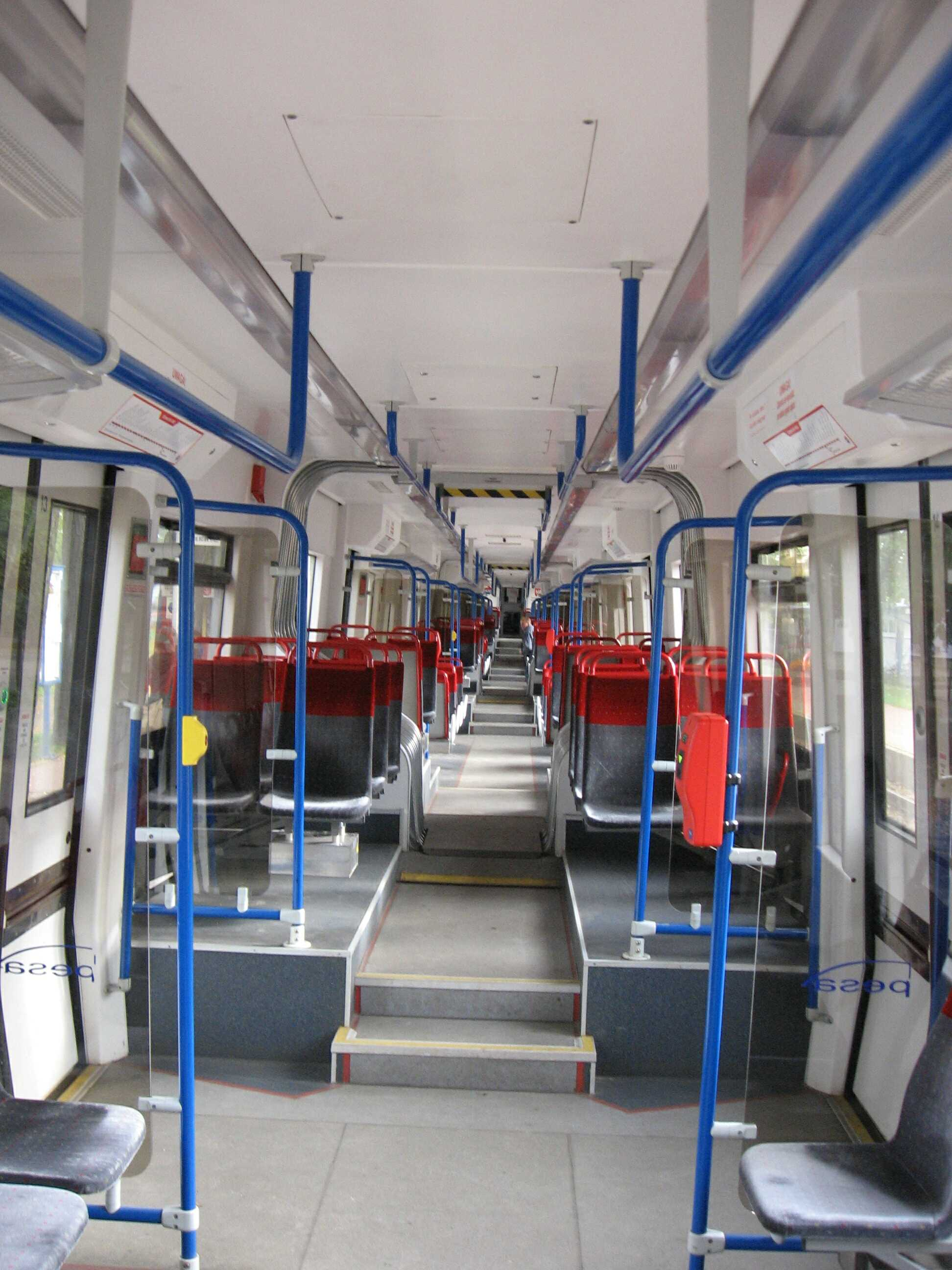
Interior of EN95

The EN95 unit features floors at three different heights: 600 mm in the low-floor sections with entrance doors, 920 mm in the raised sections above the Jacobs bogies between adjacent cars, and 1,290 mm in the high-floor sections above the end bogies. Two steps lead from the low-floor to the medium-floor section, and three steps lead to the high-floor section.

The passenger area has a 2+2 seating arrangement with upholstered seats, except in the middle parts of the end cars where the seats are positioned along the windows. The low-floor section of the first car has two bicycle holders, while the low-floor section of the last car has space for larger luggage and one spot for a disabled person, next to which ramps are installed. The interior is equipped with CCTV, forced-air and electric convective heating, visual and auditory passenger information systems, and ticket validators. In early 2007, air conditioning was added, and during the modernization between 2014 and 2015, Wi-Fi was installed. The vehicle does not have toilets.

Driver's cabins are located at both ends of the unit, accessible from the passenger section. Each cabin is equipped with air conditioning, a speed and event recording system with digital archiving, a diagnostic and control system, and a GPS location system that allows the train's current position to be transmitted to the traffic control center.

=== Bogies ===
The vehicle is supported by five two-axle bogies manufactured by Pesa. The two end bogies are powered bogies of type 21MN, while the three middle ones are Jacobs-type trailer bogies of type 34AN. Each bogie has a wheelbase of 2,500 mm, and the distance between pivot points is 13,000 mm.

The H-shaped bogie frames are welded constructions, each consisting of two side members connected by a cross member. The side members are welded into a closed box section and have forked seats at both ends for mounting rubber-metal spring caps, which serve as the primary suspension. The secondary suspension consists of two pneumatic cushions type SEK 680-13 and hydraulic dampers on each bogie. The dampers, positioned between the bogie frame and the car body, absorb vertical vibrations, while two dampers between the bogie cross member and the car body absorb transverse vibrations.

Each bogie is equipped with two wheelsets with treadless wheels of type 28 UIC-135. The diameter of the powered wheels is 840 mm, and the trailer wheels are 720 mm. Ring brake discs are mounted on the wheel discs.

=== Propulsion and automation ===
The unit was initially adapted for 600 V DC power supply and was upgraded to also support 3,000 V DC during the modernization between 2014 and 2015.

The drive system comprises four three-phase induction motors type DKLBZ0910-04, each with a power of 280 kW, manufactured by VEM Sachsenwerk. The torque from each motor is transmitted to the axle of a powered wheelset via a two-stage axle gearbox type SZH 495 from Voith, using a hollow shaft with a jaw coupling, which also compensates for movements between the drive assembly and the drive axle.

Each motor is powered by a power inverter type FT-300-600 from Medcom. Each inverter, along with its motor, soft-start unit SS600-600, 24 V powered drive controller, and braking resistor RH300-600, forms a drive unit type ANT300-600.

The vehicle uses current collectors type DSA 200-PKP manufactured by Stemmann. The current collectors, auxiliary converters, and traction motor fans are located on the roofs of the end cars, while the braking resistors are on the roofs of the middle cars.

The unit is equipped with train protection systems: an active vigilance control device and a radiotelephone, but lacks the automatic braking system, as it is not used on Warsaw Commuter Railway lines.

== Operation ==
Country	Operator	Number	Type	Operation period
Poland	Warsaw Commuter Railway	1	EN95-01	1 September 2004–8 February 2017; 8 February 2017–June 2019

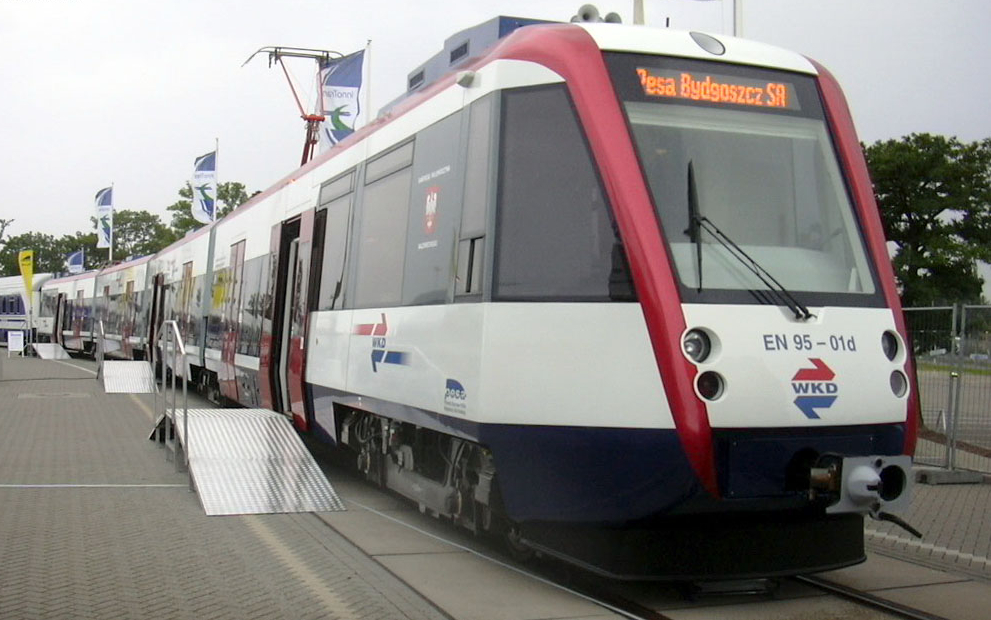
EN95-01 at InnoTrans (2004)

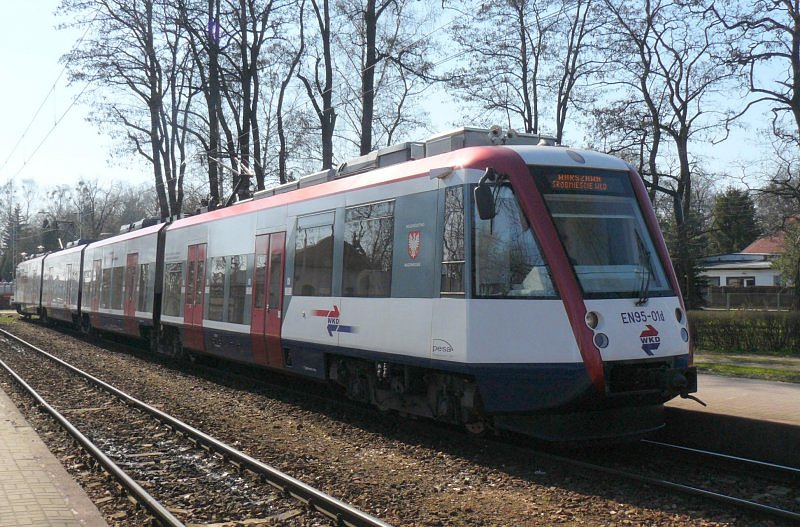
Unit at the Grodzisk Mazowiecki Radońska station (2013)

The EN95-01 unit commenced operations on 1 September 2004, serving one of the 10 routes operated by the Warsaw Commuter Railway at that time. From September 20 to 24, the unit was loaned to the manufacturer for display at the InnoTrans trade fair in Berlin. Initially, the vehicle experienced various malfunctions, including current collector and compressor failures, as well as wiring issues, resulting in less frequent operation. These defects were repaired by the manufacturer under warranty.

In the fall of 2006, the unit was out of service for several months due to a collision with a truck. In February and April 2007, the train was granted indefinite operational approval. On November 20, the unit was transferred to PKP Warszawska Kolej Dojazdowa in exchange for the Masovian Voivodeship acquiring shares in Warsaw Commuter Railway worth almost 9.4 million PLN, equivalent to the train's value. On December 4, to mark the 80th anniversary of the Warsaw Commuter Railway line, a press conference on the company's history and future was held aboard the EN95-01 traveling from Grodzisk to Warsaw.

In January 2014, Warsaw Commuter Railway announced a tender for the periodic overhaul and modernization of the unit, primarily to adapt it for 3,000 and 600 V DC power. Additional modifications included installing track cameras, changing heater power supply, tinting side windows, and sealing the roof. In early March, Pesa's bid was selected, and on March 27, Warsaw Commuter Railway awarded the contract, valued at over 5.5 million PLN. The initial completion date was set for 27 September 2014, and the train was sent to Pesa in April. However, the overhaul faced delays due to challenges in selecting new 3,000 V DC electrical components and ensuring safety, structural integrity, and vehicle clearance. Pesa assured in December that the unit would return by March 2015, but the deadline was pushed to May, then to June, July, and finally to August. In September, the expected completion was revised to October, and by late October, the handover was scheduled for December 6. Eventually, the unit was delivered to Grodzisk Mazowiecki on December 11, and the acceptance process began, which also extended beyond the anticipated timeframe.

On 15 April 2016, the EN95-01 was finally accepted after repairs initiated in March 2014. It resumed service the next day, starting with an 8:35 AM departure from Grodzisk to Warsaw. However, after five hours of operation, it was sidelined again due to malfunctions with the passenger information system, door closures, and ticket validators. These issues were rectified within 10 days, and the unit returned to service on April 26. It operated for about a month before entering warranty repairs for issues related to the 3,000 V DC conversion. After May 28, when the Warsaw Commuter Railway network switched to the new power supply, the unit only performed technical and service runs. Finally, on 8 February 2017, after warranty repairs, the unit resumed regular passenger service.
