= PKP class EN97 =

Electric multiple unit produced by Pesa

PKP class EN97 Pesa 33WE
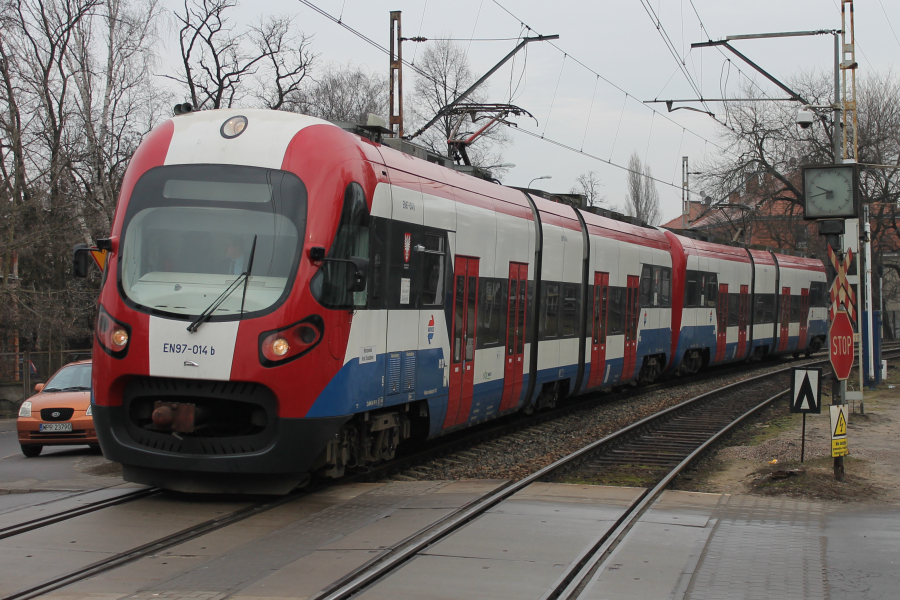
- EN97-014 at the Tworki railway station
- Stock type: electric multiple unit
- Manufacturer: Pesa
- Assembly: Bydgoszcz, Poland
- Constructed: 2011–2012
- Number built: 14
- Predecessor: Class EN94
- Capacity: 500

Specifications
- Train length: 60,000 m (200,000 ft)
- Width: 2,850 mm (112 in)
- Height: 4,452 mm (175.3 in)
- Floor height: 500 mm (20 in)
- Maximum speed: 80 km/h (50 mph)
- Weight: 101.5 t (224,000 lb)
- Engine type: induction motor TME42-26-4
- Power output: 1,440 kW
- Transmission: Wikov AWHC500Z
- Acceleration: 1.2 m/s²
- Electric systems: 600 V DC/3,000 V DC
- AAR wheel arrangement: Bo'2'Bo'+Bo'2'Bo'
- Braking system: MZT Hepos (ED+EP+K)

The PKP class EN97 (Note: Designated by Pesa as the Pesa 33WE.) is a standard-gauge, low-platform electric multiple unit produced by Pesa in Bydgoszcz in a quantity of 14 units for the Warsaw Commuter Railway. They replaced the EN94 series trains.

== History ==
=== Origins ===
After World War II, electric multiple units were produced exclusively by Pafawag from Wrocław until 1997. Pafawag was the manufacturer of the most popular electric multiple unit in Poland, the EN57 series, as well as the EN94 used by the Warsaw Commuter Railway. After its privatization in the 1990s, Pafawag ceased the production of such vehicles, with the last model produced being the ED73 in 1997. For several years, no electric multiple units were produced in Poland.

During this time, Polish State Railways and later local governments primarily purchased diesel railcars and diesel multiple units, as fuel-hungry locomotives dominated non-electrified lines. This period allowed Polish manufacturers to gain experience in building and operators in utilizing lightweight rolling stock. Additionally, existing EN57 series multiple units were modernized.

Building on the experience gained from producing smaller diesel vehicles, Pesa undertook the challenge of constructing its first electric multiple unit – the 13WE – in 2004.

=== Order history ===
As early as 2004, the Warsaw Commuter Railway planned to purchase an additional 9 units of the 13WE series. However, it was not until 27 May 2009 that a tender was announced for 14 units with similar parameters to the 13WE, but with fewer seats. This tender was canceled on October 9 due to budget overruns. On 5 November 2009, a new tender for 14 vehicles was announced, with slightly different technical parameters, including the abandonment of single-space trains. The tender was won again by Pesa, which proposed entirely new units – the 33WE. The purchase agreement was signed on 26 March 2010.

In the tenders for Warsaw Commuter Railway, Pesa could not offer vehicles from the Elf family due to requirements such as the smaller minimum curve radius (Warsaw Commuter Railway – 22 m, Elf – 100 m) and floor height (Warsaw Commuter Railway – from 400 to 600 mm, Elf – from 760 to 800 mm).

The new vehicle was designed by Pesa with the participation of the Tabor Railway Vehicle Institute as part of development work.

== Construction ==
=== Body ===
The 33WE is a six-car, two-space, partially low-floor electric multiple unit designed for suburban services. Each unit consists of two identical three-car sections, designated as a and b. Each section is equipped with one driver's cabin and a special control panel (referred to as the maneuvering panel) at the opposite end, featuring vehicle status displays and monitoring systems. This design allows both halves of the unit to operate independently in workshop conditions. This solution was chosen due to frequent collisions with road vehicles on the Warsaw Commuter Railway.

=== Interior ===
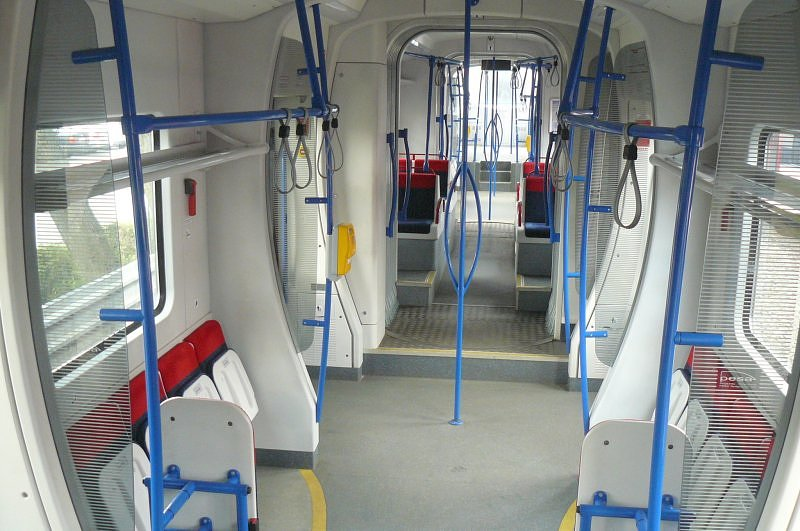
Interior of the EN97-007

Both sections of the train have four pairs of sliding doors. The floor height at the doors is 500 mm above the top of the rail. Most seats in the unit are oriented parallel to the windows, with traditional 2+2 seating arranged only in the central cars of each section. The train includes 8 bicycle spaces and 4 spaces for disabled passengers. The vehicles are equipped with air conditioning for both the driver's cabin and passenger compartments, a monitoring system, and visual and auditory information systems, but lack toilets.

=== Undercarriage and drive ===
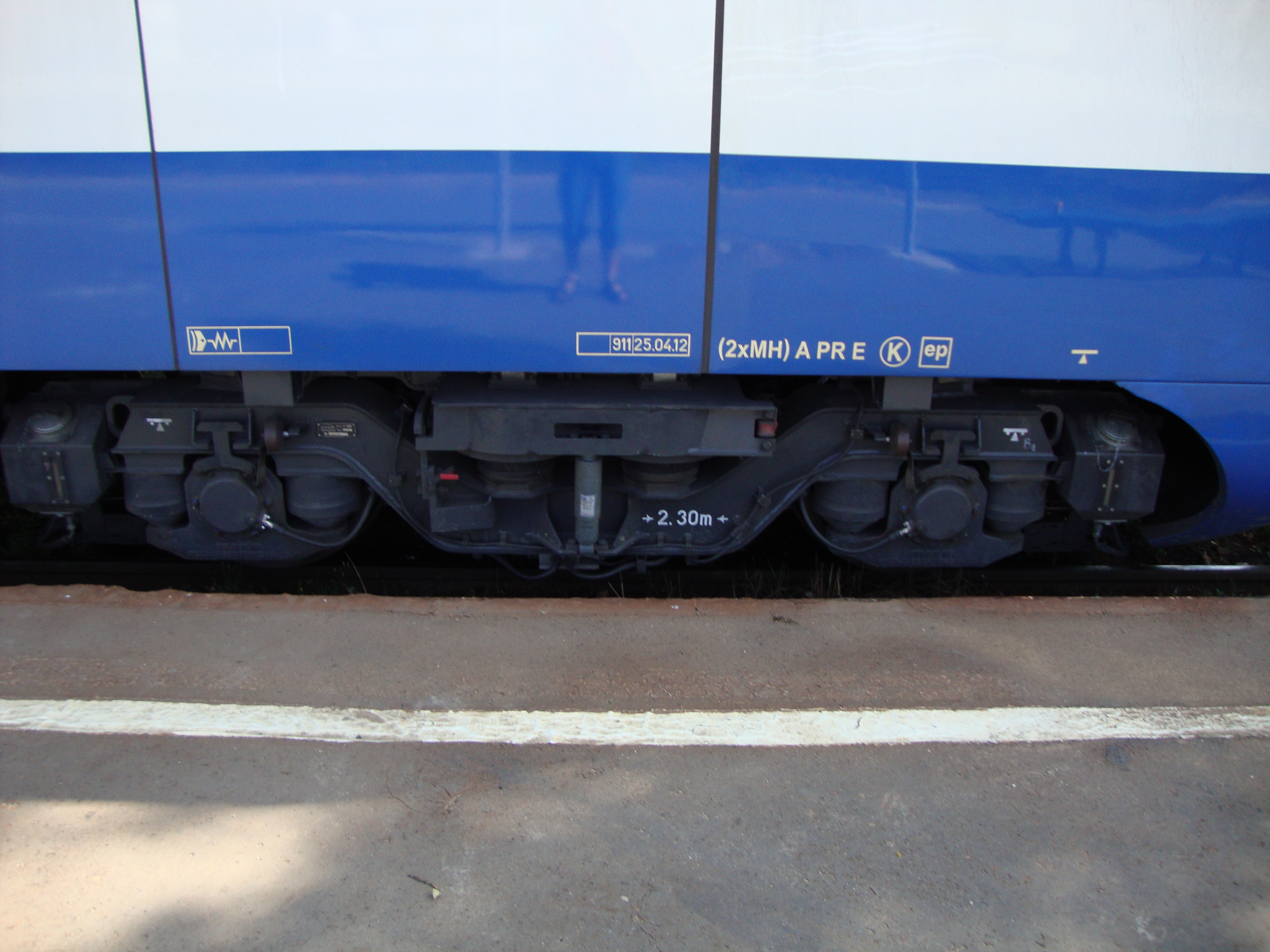
Type 34MN drive bogie

Each of the six cars is supported by one bogie. Four of the bogies, located under the end cars of each section, are drive bogies of type 34MN with a wheelbase of 2,300 mm, while the remaining two are non-driven bogies of type 43AN with a wheelbase of 2,100 mm. The bogie pivot spacing for each section of the unit is 11,750 mm. This configuration allows the train to navigate curves with a minimum radius of 23.5 meters.

The vehicles were designed to operate on a 3,000 V DC supply, which was the target voltage for the Warsaw Commuter Railway at that time. During the transition period, they were powered by 600 V DC using a 600/3,000 V converter. The vehicles cannot be simultaneously adapted to both voltages.

The drive consists of 8 three-phase induction motors type TME42-26-4 produced by Traktionssysteme Austria, each with a power output of 180 kW. The torque is transmitted to the wheelsets via a two-stage gearbox AWHC500Z produced by Wikov.

=== Safety ===
The structural strength is classified as P-III according to the PN-EN 12663 standard. The vehicles are equipped with a Radio-Stop function via a radio telephone produced by Pyrylandia.

=== Modifications based on passenger feedback ===
During the prototype testing phase, the Warsaw Commuter Railway allowed passengers to provide feedback on the train, some of which was incorporated into the construction of subsequent units. Additional handrails were installed in the passenger area, existing ones were repositioned, the passenger information system was modified, some luggage shelves were reduced, and the method of securing bicycles was changed. Additionally, the vehicle's suspension was adjusted, and stationary noise was reduced.

In the summer of 2012, issues with the air conditioning system arose, leading to its overhaul in all vehicles.

=== Reliability ===
The vehicles require frequent re-profiling of the wheelset surfaces. Due to this issue, at the beginning of 2013, Warsaw Commuter Railway provided Pesa with one unit for additional testing on the Test Track Centre near Żmigród at the Railway Institute in Węglewo, as well as on the Warsaw Commuter Railway. At the beginning of 2014, one unit was operated on the Warsaw Commuter Railway with a modified control system. This modification involved increasing the contribution of the electro-dynamic brake in the braking process. Ultimately, this change was implemented in all EN97 units.

Passengers using the new units complained about the ergonomics of the interior and issues with the air conditioning. In July 2013, one of the units was withdrawn from service by the Office of Rail Transport due to excessive temperature and carbon dioxide levels inside the vehicle. A similar situation occurred in June 2014, when the Office of Rail Transport ordered the withdrawal of 4 vehicles. In response to the air conditioning problems, Pesa modified the air supply channels and applied film to the windows.

On 16 October 2013, a fire broke out in the driver's cabin of an EN97 unit at the locomotive depot. The incident was investigated by a specially appointed commission, and other EN97 units were not withdrawn from service.

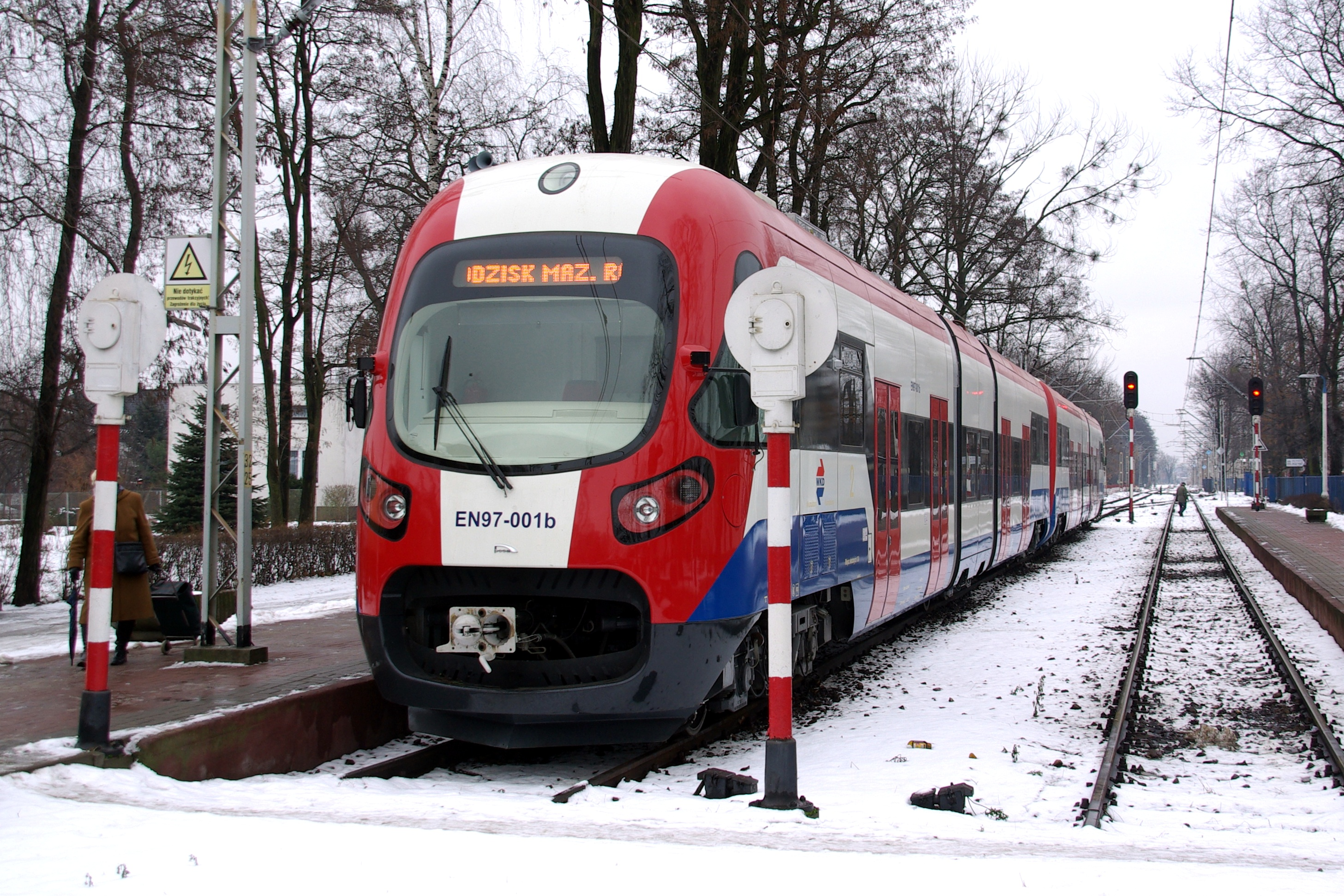
EN97-001 at Grodzisk Mazowiecki Radońska station

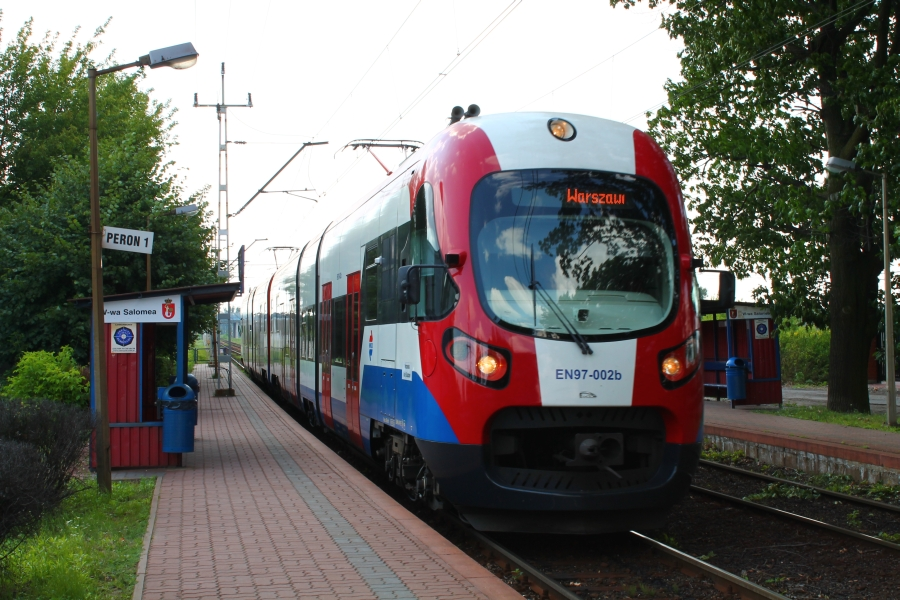
EN97-002 at Warszawa Salomea railway station

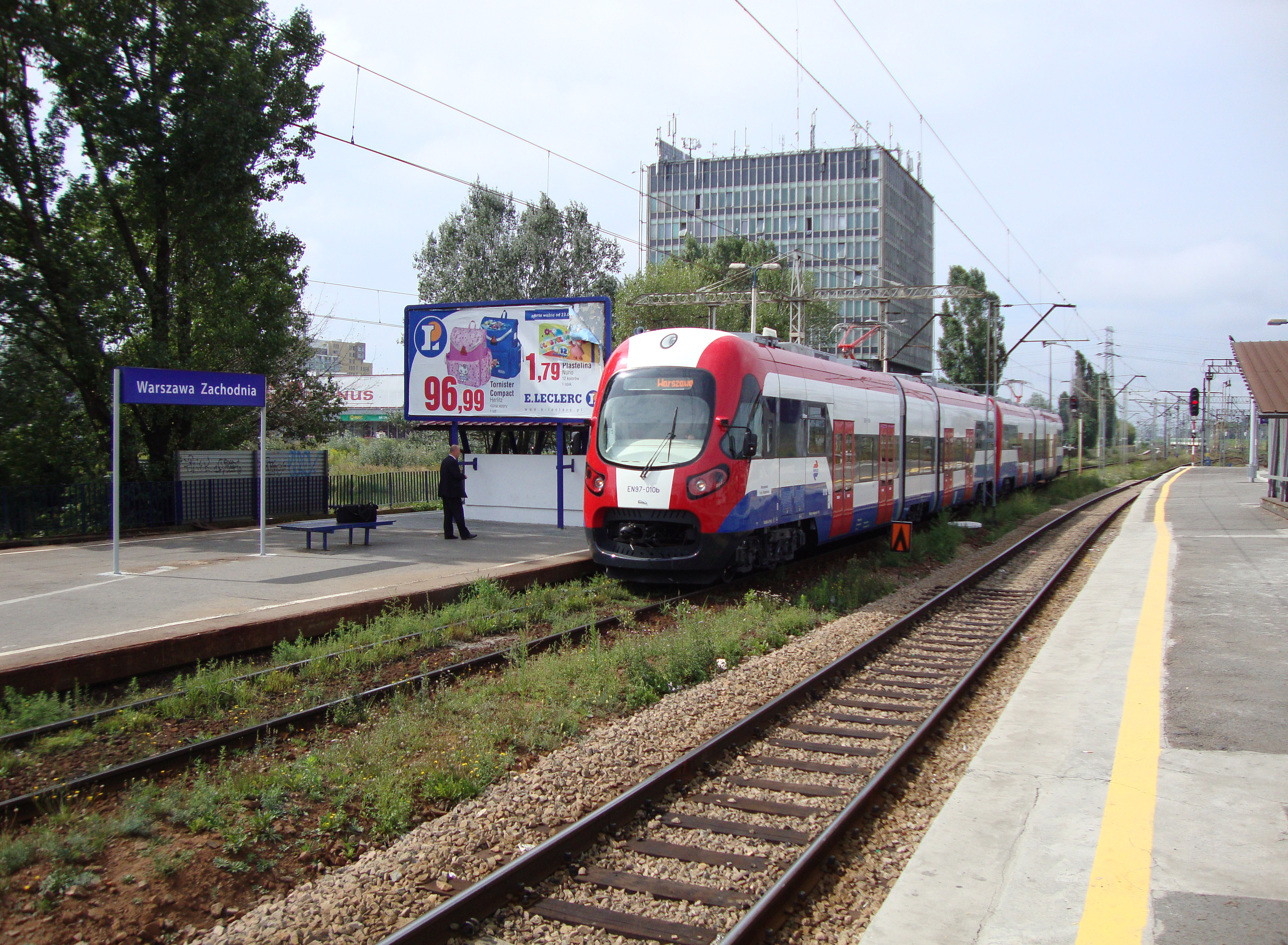
EN97-010 at Warszawa Zachodnia

== Operation ==
Country	Operator	Type	Number	Designation	Delivery	Start of operation	Sources
Poland	Warsaw Commuter Railway	33WE	14	EN97-001	7 December 2011	17 February 2012	
Poland	Warsaw Commuter Railway	33WE	14	EN97-002	28 March 2012	3 April 2012	
Poland	Warsaw Commuter Railway	33WE	14	EN97-003	25 April 2012	10 May 2012	
Poland	Warsaw Commuter Railway	33WE	14	EN97-004	26 April 2012	9 May 2012	
Poland	Warsaw Commuter Railway	33WE	14	EN97-005	30 May 2012	1 June 2012	
Poland	Warsaw Commuter Railway	33WE	14	EN97-006	31 May 2012	5 June 2012	
Poland	Warsaw Commuter Railway	33WE	14	EN97-007	26 June 2012	3 July 2012	
Poland	Warsaw Commuter Railway	33WE	14	EN97-008	28 June 2012	5 July 2012	
Poland	Warsaw Commuter Railway	33WE	14	EN97-009	24 July 2012	5 August 2012	
Poland	Warsaw Commuter Railway	33WE	14	EN97-010	31 July 2012	10 August 2012	
Poland	Warsaw Commuter Railway	33WE	14	EN97-011	28 August 2012	6 September 2012	
Poland	Warsaw Commuter Railway	33WE	14	EN97-012	30 August 2012	7 September 2012	
Poland	Warsaw Commuter Railway	33WE	14	EN97-013	22 September 2012	27 September 2012	
Poland	Warsaw Commuter Railway	33WE	14	EN97-014	28 September 2012	3 october 2012	

On 7 December 2011, the first unit was delivered to the locomotive depot in Grodzisk Mazowiecki, began testing on the Warsaw Commuter Railway on December 8, and was finally accepted on 11 January 2012. It then started observed passenger service on 12 January 2012, which was intended to gather feedback from passengers for potential modifications in subsequent units.

The second unit arrived in Grodzisk on 28 March 2012, modified based on passenger feedback from the prototype, and was accepted on March 30. Subsequent units were delivered in batches of two per month. The last unit was delivered on 28 September 2012 and began service on 3 October 2012.

As the EN97 units were delivered, the older EN94 units were progressively sold for scrap. By early 2014, EN94 units were still in use, with between 7 and 8 EN97 units and between 3 and 4 EN94 units operating during peak hours. On 1 July 2015, EN94 units were withdrawn for the summer period due to reduced traffic on the Warsaw Commuter Railway caused by renovations, making EN97 units the only rolling stock operating on the line.

In summer 2013, Warsaw Commuter Railway planned to change the traction voltage from 600 V to 3,000 V, but due to problems with the EN97 units, this change was postponed. On the night of April 30 to May 1, 2016, the first trial activation of the new voltage took place, with EN97-001 operating as a service train on the Grodzisk Mazowiecki Radońska–Komorów–Grodzisk Mazowiecki Radońska route. On May 28, the day after the voltage change, at around 4:30 AM, EN97-011 experienced a malfunction during a service run from Grodzisk to Warsaw, causing disruptions on the line until 7:00 AM.

On 1 June 2016, at approximately 12:15 AM, a MAN SE truck passing through a level crossing in Grodzisk Mazowiecki collided with EN97-001 traveling from Warsaw to Grodzisk. The train derailed, leading to disruptions on the line until 10:10 AM and a bus replacement service from Grodzisk to Podkowa Leśna.
