= Railway Institute =

Polish research institute

Coordinates: 52°15′01″N 21°06′35″E

Instut Kolejnictwa
- Established: 1951
- Address: 04-275 Warszawa ul. Józefa Chłopickiego 50
- Location: Warsaw, Poland
- Website: Official site

The Railway Institute (Polish: Instytut Kolejnictwa) is a research institute located in Warsaw, Poland.

The Railway Institute (formerly Railway Scientific and Technical Centre (CNTK)) is operating under the Polish Ministry of Transport, Construction and Maritime Economy (former Polish Ministry of Infrastructure), and is notified under EU Railway Directive 2008/57/CE concerning railway interoperability.

The Railway Institute, operating for 60 years in the transport sector, mainly in the rail sector, conducts scientific and research works, as well as services (including calibration of universal masters and measuring instruments) and performs certification works in the fields of railways and urban rail transport.

The Railway Institute owns a test track for conducting various experiments and also possesses the necessary infrastructure for R&D studies in the field of railway transport.

The Railway Institute is a Notified Body under the Interoperability of the Railway System Directive NB 1467.

The Railway Institute is a member of many railway organisations in Europe, such as UIC, UNIFE, and European Rail Research Advisory Council (ERRAC).

== Activities ==
The fields of activities are:

- Rolling stock research:

- materials and construction elements,
- certification tests for rail passenger cars, freight wagon, locomotives and traction units.

- Consulting activities:

- feasibility studies for railway investment projects,
- feasibility studies for urban transport projects,
- transport concepts for large agglomerations and for regions environmental impact analyses.

- Railway infrastructure research:

- permanent way infrastructure (e.g. tracks, turnouts, subgrade),
- control command and signalling (e.g. electronic interlocking tests),
- electric traction and power supply systems (e.g. energy quality assessments),
- telecommunication and telematics (e.g. mobile radio system change strategy),
- environmental protection.
