= Chojnów (disambiguation) =

Chojnów may refer to:

- Chojnów in the Lower Silesian Voivodeship in Poland
- the Gmina Chojnów district, also in the Lower Silesian Voivodeship
- Chojnów in the Masovian Voivodeship in Poland
- the Chojnów Landscape Park, also in the Masovian Voivodeship
