= Kamionka, Gmina Piaseczno =

Kamionka
- Village
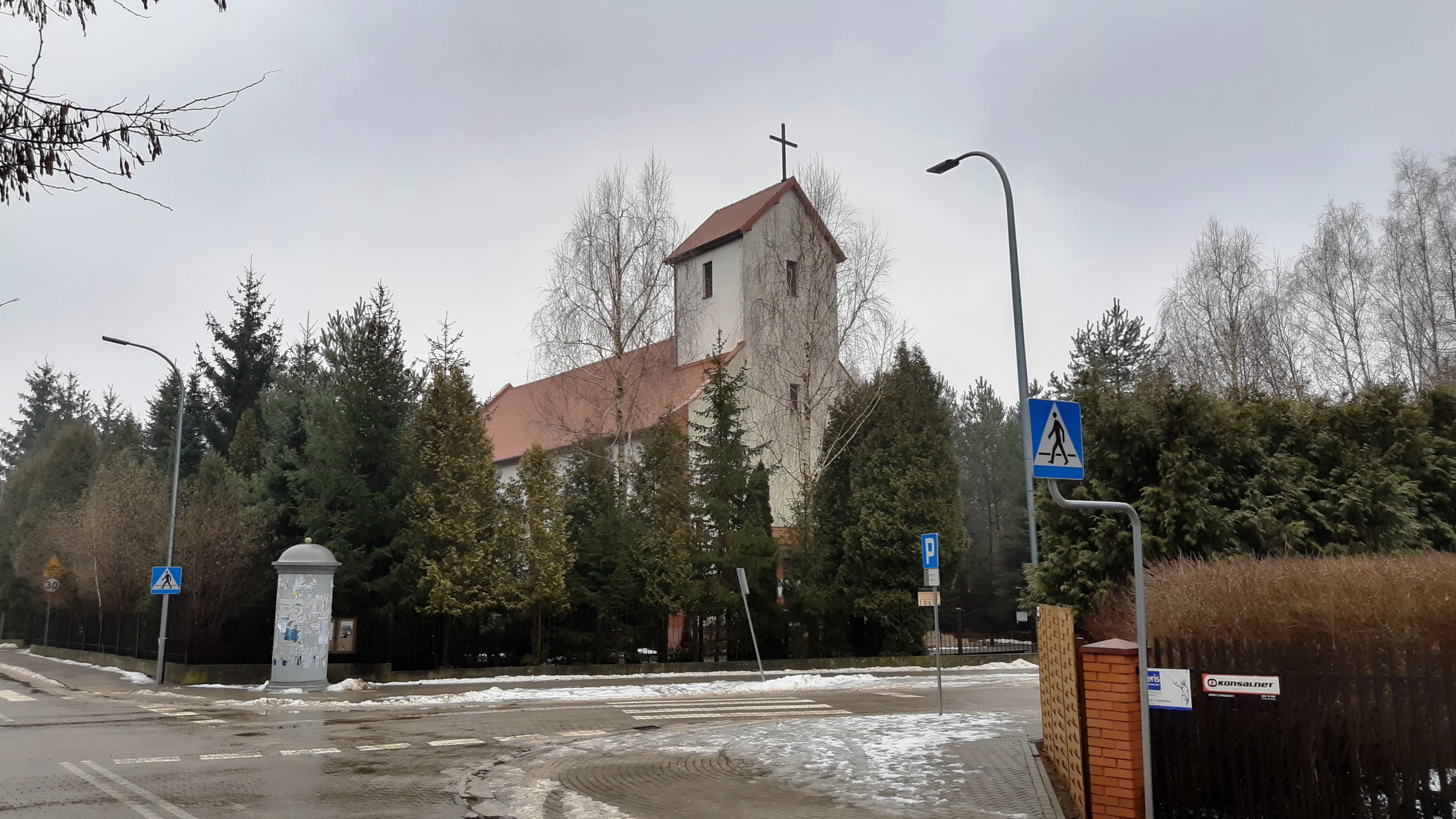
- Holy Family church in Kamionka

- Location within Poland
- Coordinates: 52°03′42″N 20°58′39″E
- Country: Poland
- Voivodeship: Masovian
- County: Piaseczno
- Gmina: Piaseczno
- Time zone: UTC+1 (CET)
  - Summer (DST): UTC+2 (CEST)
- Vehicle registration: WPI
- Primary airport: Warsaw Chopin Airport

Kamionka [kaˈmjɔnka] is a village in the administrative district of Gmina Piaseczno, within Piaseczno County, Masovian Voivodeship, in east-central Poland. It is part of the Warsaw metropolitan area.

The village was founded in 1912 by splitting from Gołków. The name probably derives from the deposits of a mixture of gravel and sand found in the area. In Old Polish fine gravel was called kamień.
