= J-Town =

J-Town is a nickname for:

- Japantown, enclaves of ethnic Japanese outside Japan
  - Japantown, San Francisco, California, U.S.
  - Japantown, San Jose, California, U.S.
- Jakarta, Indonesia
- Jefferson, South Carolina, U.S.
- Jeffersontown, Kentucky, U.S.
- Jinjang, Malaysia
- Johnstown, Pennsylvania, U.S.
- Jonesboro, Arkansas, U.S.
- Joplin, Missouri, U.S.
- Jos, Plateau, Nigeria
- Little Tokyo, Los Angeles, California, U.S.
- Jeddah, Saudi Arabia
- Jerusalem, Israel
- Rzeszów–Jasionka Airport, Poland
- Jaffna, Sri Lanka
- Julianów and Józefosław, Poland
- Jyväskylä, Finland
- Joliet, Illinois, U.S.

== See also ==
- Jimmy "J-Town" Wizard, a member of the English bands Violent Reaction and Higher Power
