= Grochowa =

Grochowa may refer to the following places in Poland:

- Grochowa, Trzebnica County in Lower Silesian Voivodeship (south-west Poland)
- Grochowa, Ząbkowice County in Lower Silesian Voivodeship (south-west Poland)
- Grochowa, Masovian Voivodeship (east-central Poland)
