= Siedliska, Masovian Voivodeship =

Siedliska
- Village
- Location within Poland
- Coordinates: 52°4′N 21°3′E
- Country: Poland
- Voivodeship: Masovian
- County: Piaseczno
- Gmina: Piaseczno
- Time zone: UTC+1 (CET)
  - Summer (DST): UTC+2 (CEST)
- Vehicle registration: WPI

Siedliska [ɕɛdˈlʲiska] is a village in the administrative district of Gmina Piaseczno, within Piaseczno County, Masovian Voivodeship, in the Warsaw metropolitan area, in east-central Poland.

== History ==
Three Polish citizens were murdered by Nazi Germany in the village during World War II.
