= Jolanta Brzeska =

Polish social activist (1947–2011)

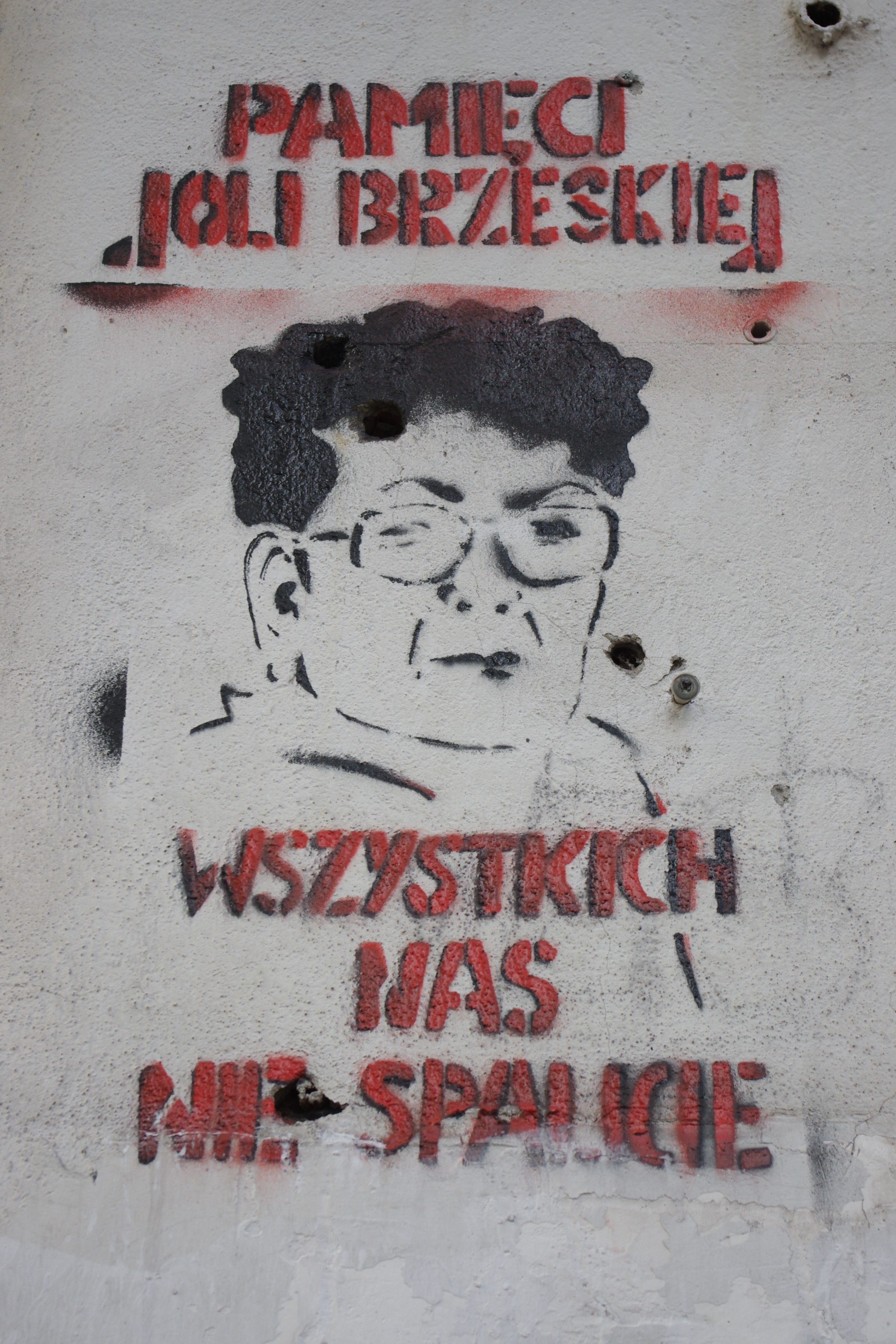
- Graffiti commemorating Brzeska outside her home
- Born: Jolanta Krulikowska; January 25, 1947; Warsaw, Poland
- Died: March 1, 2011 (aged 64); Warsaw, Poland
- Resting place: Cmentarz Komunalny Południowy, Warsaw
- Occupation: Tenants' rights activist
- Years active: 2006–2011
- Spouse: Kazmierz Brzeski (1967–2007; his death)
- Children: 1

Jolanta Brzeska (née Krulikowska; 25 January 1947 – 1 March 2011) was a Polish social activist known for her defence of tenants facing eviction. Since her death, Brzeska's image has been used by the tenants' movement as a symbol of the fight against evictions.

== Biography ==
Brzeska was born in Warsaw, the daughter of Franciszek Krulikowski and Jadwiga Krulikowska (née Urbańska). In 1962, she graduated from Antoni Dobiszewski High School in Mokotów. In December 1967, Brzeska married Kazimierz Brzeski (10 January 1941 – 14 December 2007); together, they had a daughter, Magdalena. After having children, Brzeska completed her high school leaving examination in 1970. She went on to work at various publishing companies, including Institute of Thermal Technology at Warsaw University of Technology. From 2002, Brzeska took various classes at the University of the Third Age.

== Activism ==
In 2006, after Mirosław Kochalski, the Mayor of Warsaw, made the decision to allow re-privatisation, the building at 6 Nabielaka Street, where Brzeska was among the tenants, became the property of the heirs of its former owner. In May 2006, the heirs' lawyer unilaterally terminated the lease agreement for the building's tenants and increased rent for the first time. As a result, the Brzeski family, as well as other tenants, co-founded the Warsaw Tenants' Association (Polish: Warszawskie Stowarzyszenie Lokatorów). The organisation was officially registered in 2007 and aimed to support tenants who were at risk of eviction after their buildings returned to the heirs of their former owners. Brzeska's husband died in 2007; the rent for their apartment increased several times, ultimately exceeding the amount of Brzeska's pension. After failing to pay her rent, Brzeska was issued with an eviction notice. The owners' lawyer attempted to seize her apartment on several occasions, and several proposed settlement methods were not successful.

Brzeska took part in public protests against the implementation of eviction orders. She provided emotional support to tenants in similar situations and started studying housing law. Brzeska took records of eviction cases, and regularly took part in Warsaw City Council meetings demanding the implementation of tenant protection measures.

== Death and investigation ==
On 1 March 2011, Brzeska left her apartment without taking her purse or phone. She was reported missing by her daughter four days later. Six days after her disappearance, Brzeska was linked to a burnt female body that had been discovered by a walker. Genetic tests confirmed that the body belonged to Brzeska, with an autopsy concluding that she had died of thermal shock, carbon monoxide poisoning, and extensive burns as a result of kerosene. Brzeska's funeral took place on 3 January 2012 at the Southern Communal Cemetery in Antoninów.

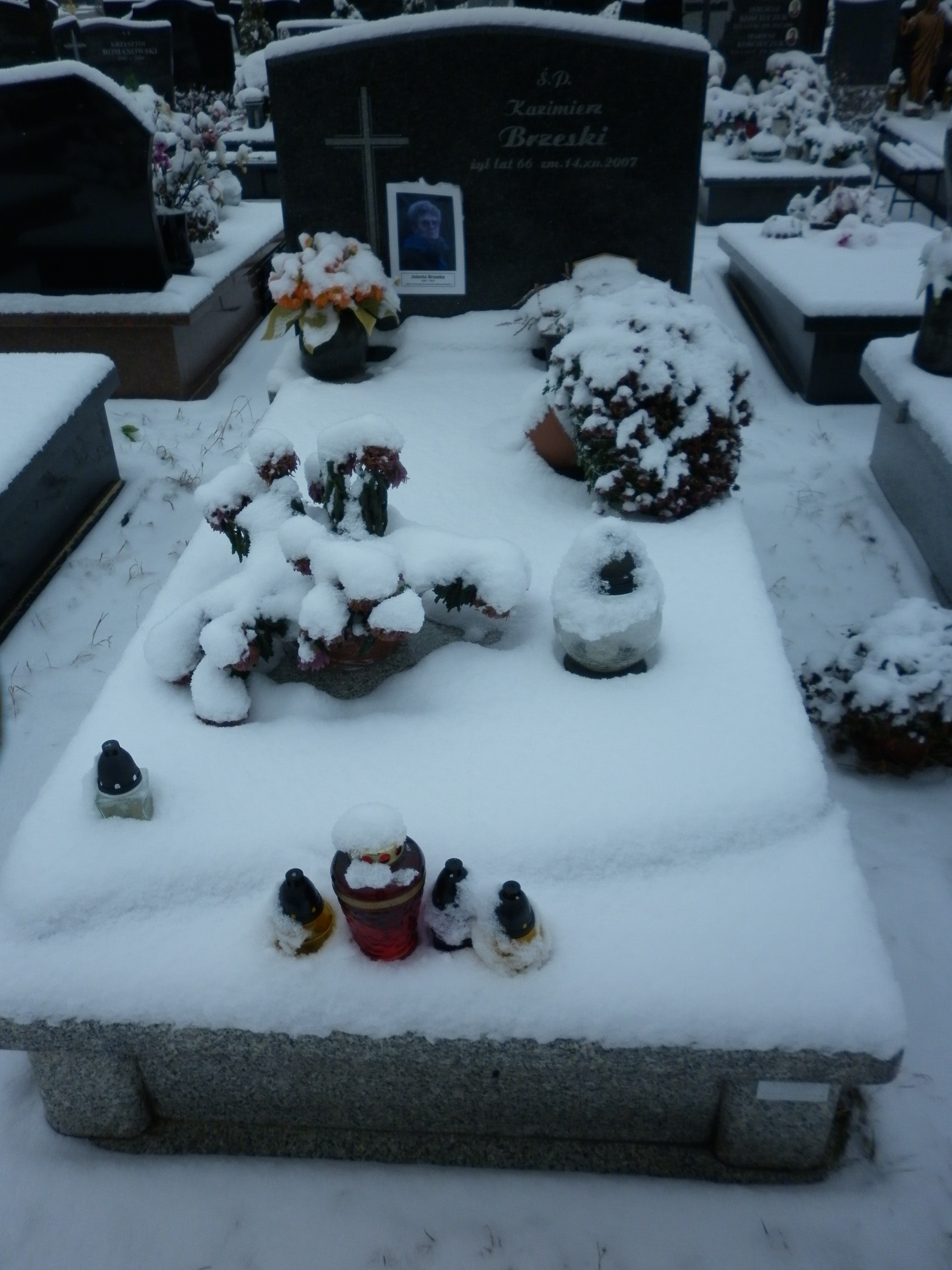
Brzeska's grave in Cmentarz Komunalny Poludniowy, Warsaw

Following Brzeska's death, her life and activism was reported upon heavily in the Polish press. At the initial stages of the investigation into Brzeska's death, the hypotheses of self-immolation and murder were both considered. An expert opinion, published in February 2013, ruled out the suicide hypothesis. The prosecutor's office considered murder with potential motives included the settling of accounts between Brzeska and her landlords. On 8 April 2013, the investigation was discontinued due to the failure to identify any perpetrators.

On 19 August 2016, Zbigniew Ziobro, the Minister of Justice and Public Prosecutor General, announced that the investigation into Brzeska's death had been reopened. At the same time, criminal proceedings began against the prosecutors in the initial investigation for "glaring omissions at the first stage of the investigation", including incorrectly classifying the crime, lacking an investigative plan, using inexperienced prosecutors and officers, conducting an incomplete examination of the site where Brzeska's body was found, failing to collect evidence, and taking too long to examine evidence that was collected. In August 2021, the second investigation was similarly discontinued to a lack of identified culprit; at the same time, concerns about the initial investigation were also dismissed.

== Legacy ==
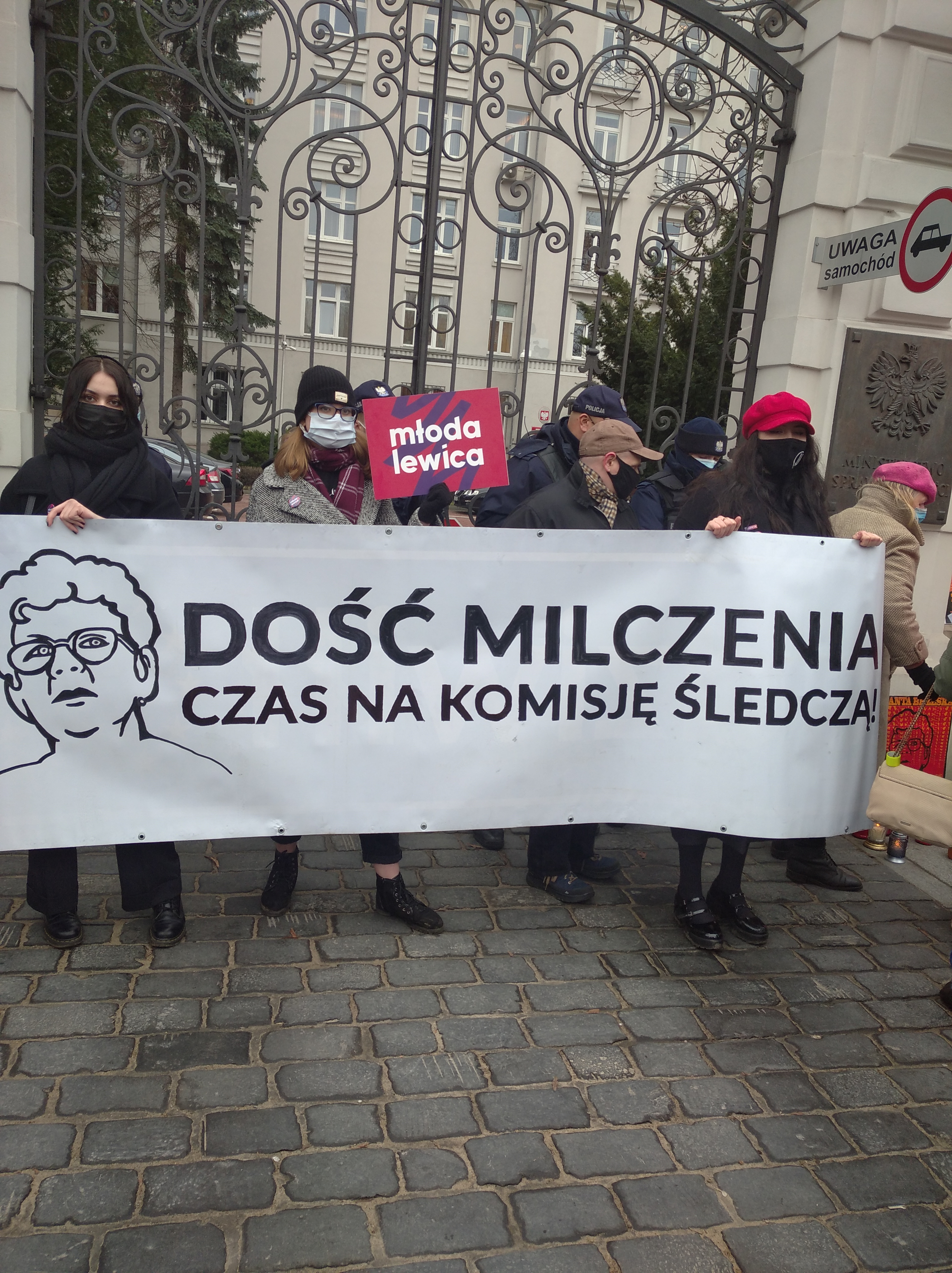
Demonstration in front of the Ministry of Justice on the tenth anniversary of Brzeska's death (1 March 2021)

Since her death, Brzeska's image has become a symbol of the tenants' rights movement, and has been used in artwork, banners, and graffiti.

On 25 February 2012, the play Kto zabił Alonę Iwanowną? (lit. 'Who Killed Alyona Ivanovna?') by Michał Kmiecik premiered at the Teatr Dramatyczny in Warsaw, inspired by the novel Crime and Punishment by Fyodor Dostoevsky and Brzeska's life.

Numerous songs have been made dedicated to Brzeska, including "Kto zabił Jolantę Brzeską" (lit. 'Who Killed Jolanta Brzeska') by Kopyt/Kowalski; "To jest piosenka o różnych rzeczach" (lit. 'This Song is About Different Things') by Pablopavo; and "Wszystkich nas nie spalicie" (lit. 'You Will Not Burn Us All') by Kruschwitz.

On 1 March 2017, to mark the sixth anniversary of Brzeska's death, a square named after her was opened in Warsaw at the intersection of Zakrzewska and Iwicka streets in the Mokotów district; a commemorative stone was also placed at the site. Later that year, the play Spalenie Joanny (lit. 'The Burning of Joan'), written by Magdalena Miecznicka and directed by Agata Baumgart, premiered at Teatroteka, based on Brzeska's life.

On 25 February 2021, the Sejm adopted a resolution commemorating Brzeska on the 10th anniversary of her death. On 10 June, she received honorary citizenship of Warsaw. That year, the film Lokatorka (lit. 'The Tenant'), directed by Michał Otłowski and based on Brzeska and the re-privatisation scandal, premiered. Sławomira Łozińska played Janina Markowska, a character based heavily on Brzeska.

In 2023, the television series Feedback featured a character, Małgorzata Kalska, based on Brzeska.
