= Jazgarzew =

- Village
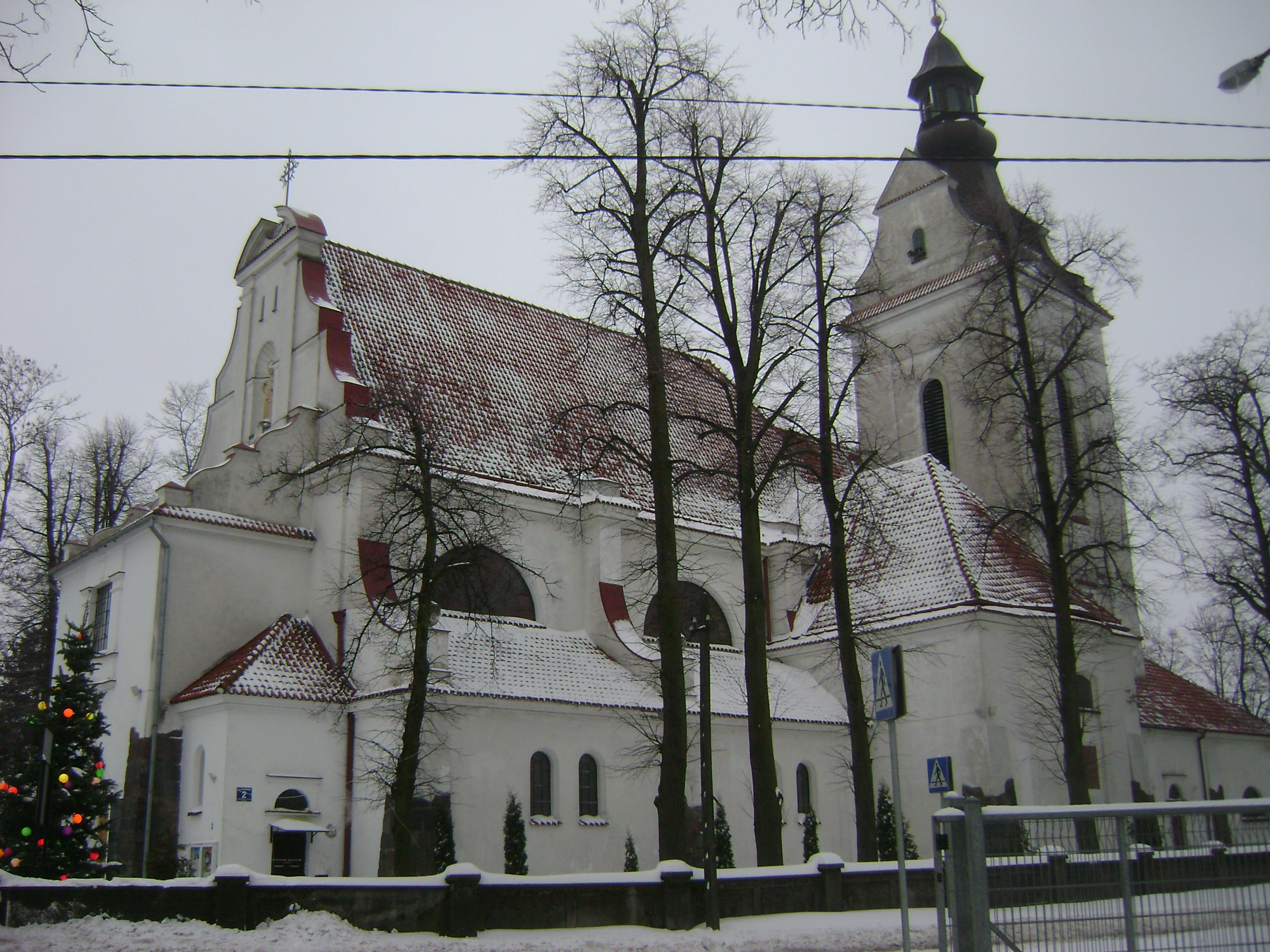
- Saint Roch church in Jazgarzew

- Location within Poland
- Coordinates: 52°2′10″N 20°59′23″E
- Country: Poland
- Voivodeship: Masovian
- County: Piaseczno
- Gmina: Piaseczno
- Time zone: UTC+1 (CET)
  - Summer (DST): UTC+2 (CEST)
- Vehicle registration: WPI
- Primary airport: Warsaw Chopin Airport

Jazgarzew [jazˈɡaʐɛf] is a village in the administrative district of Gmina Piaseczno, within Piaseczno County, Masovian Voivodeship, in the Warsaw metropolitan area, in east-central Poland.

== Etymology ==
The name of the village is of Polish origin, and comes from the word jazgarz, which means "ruffe".

== History ==
There is an archaeological site from the ancient Roman times in the village.

The territory became part of the emerging Polish state in the 10th century. The village was mentioned in medieval documents in 1297. In 1326, Trojden I, Duke of Masovia from the Piast dynasty granted it to knight Domisław. Jazgarzew was a private village of Polish nobility, administratively located in the Masovian Voivodeship in the Greater Poland Province of the Kingdom of Poland.

In 1827 Jazgarzew had a population of 239.

Two Polish citizens were murdered by Nazi Germany in the village during World War II.

== Notable people ==
- Mieczysław Zygfryd Słowikowski (1896–1989), Polish Army officer whose intelligence work in North Africa facilitated Allied preparations for the 1942 Operation Torch landings
