= Jesówka =

- Village
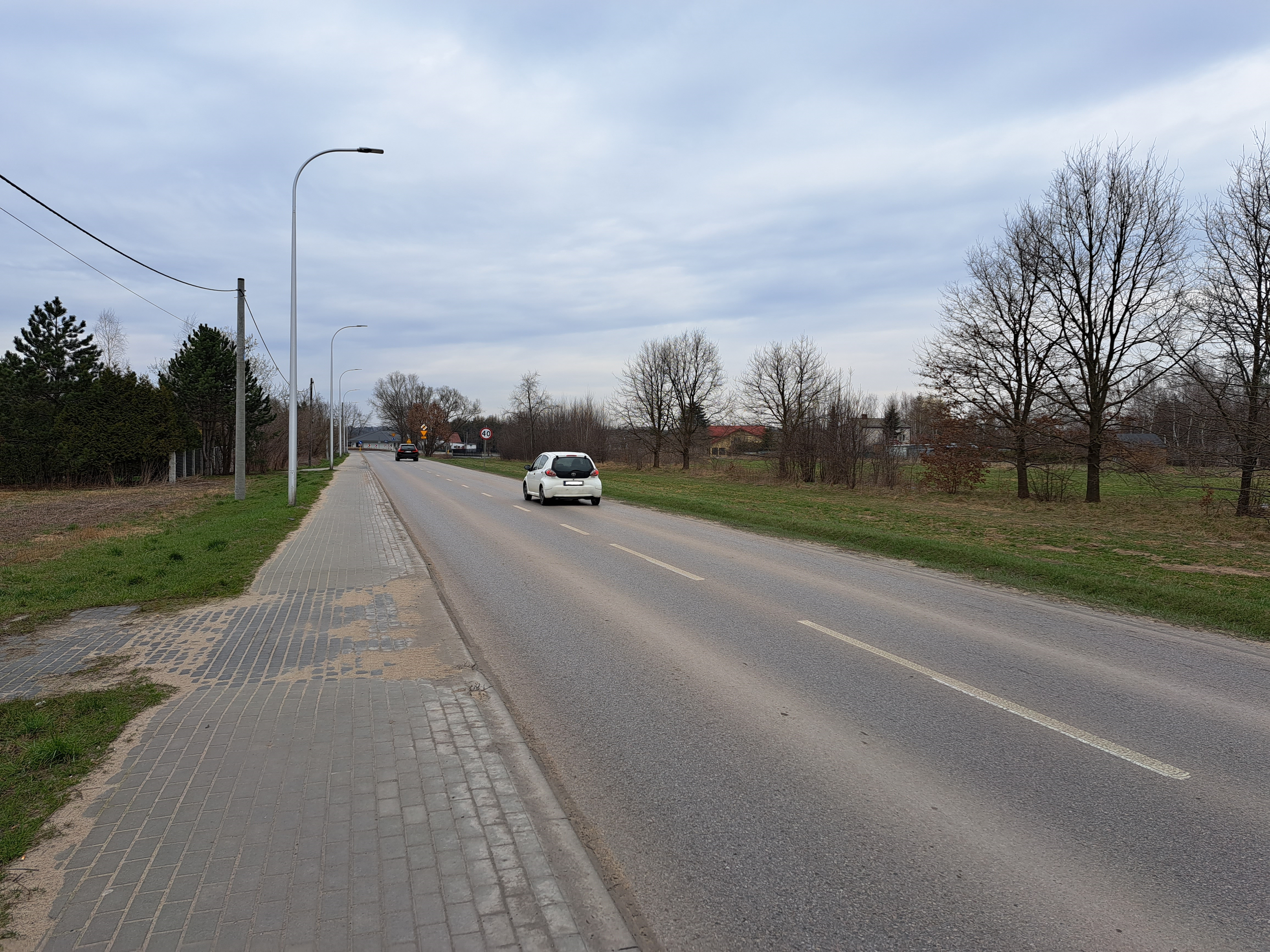

- Location within Poland
- Coordinates: 52°2′24″N 21°1′6″E
- Country: Poland
- Voivodeship: Masovian
- County: Piaseczno
- Gmina: Piaseczno
- Time zone: UTC+1 (CET)
  - Summer (DST): UTC+2 (CEST)
- Vehicle registration: WPI

Jesówka [jɛˈsufka] is a village in the administrative district of Gmina Piaseczno, within Piaseczno County, Masovian Voivodeship, in the Warsaw metropolitan area, in east-central Poland.

== History ==
Six Polish citizens were murdered by Nazi Germany in the village during World War II.
