= Runów-Osada =

- Settlement
- Location within Poland
- Coordinates: 52°02′33″N 20°55′17″E
- Country: Poland
- Voivodeship: Masovian
- County: Piaseczno
- Gmina: Piaseczno

Runów-Osada [ˈrunuf ɔˈsada] is a settlement in the administrative district of Gmina Piaseczno, within Piaseczno County, Masovian Voivodeship, in east-central Poland.
