= Złotokłos =

- Village
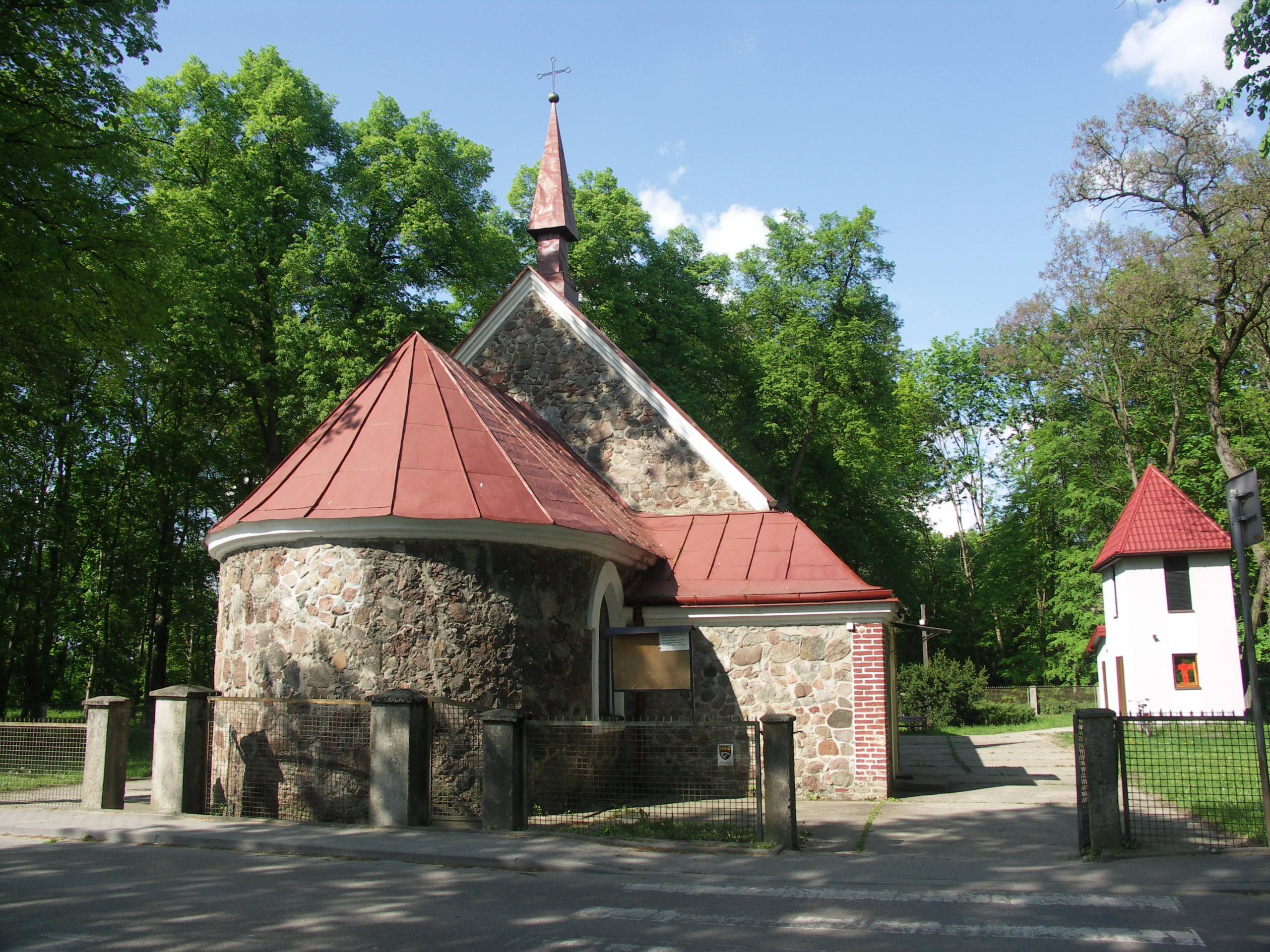
- Church of Our Lady of Mercy

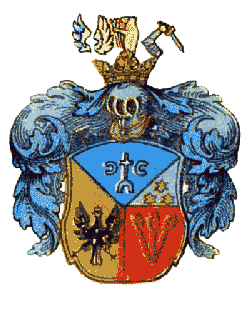
- Coat of arms

- Location within Poland
- Coordinates: 52°0′15″N 20°54′25″E
- Country: Poland
- Voivodeship: Masovian
- County: Piaseczno
- Gmina: Piaseczno
- Website: http://www.zlotoklos.pl

Złotokłos [zwɔˈtɔkwɔs] is a village in the administrative district of Gmina Piaseczno, within Piaseczno County, Masovian Voivodeship, in east-central Poland.
