= Gołków =

- Village
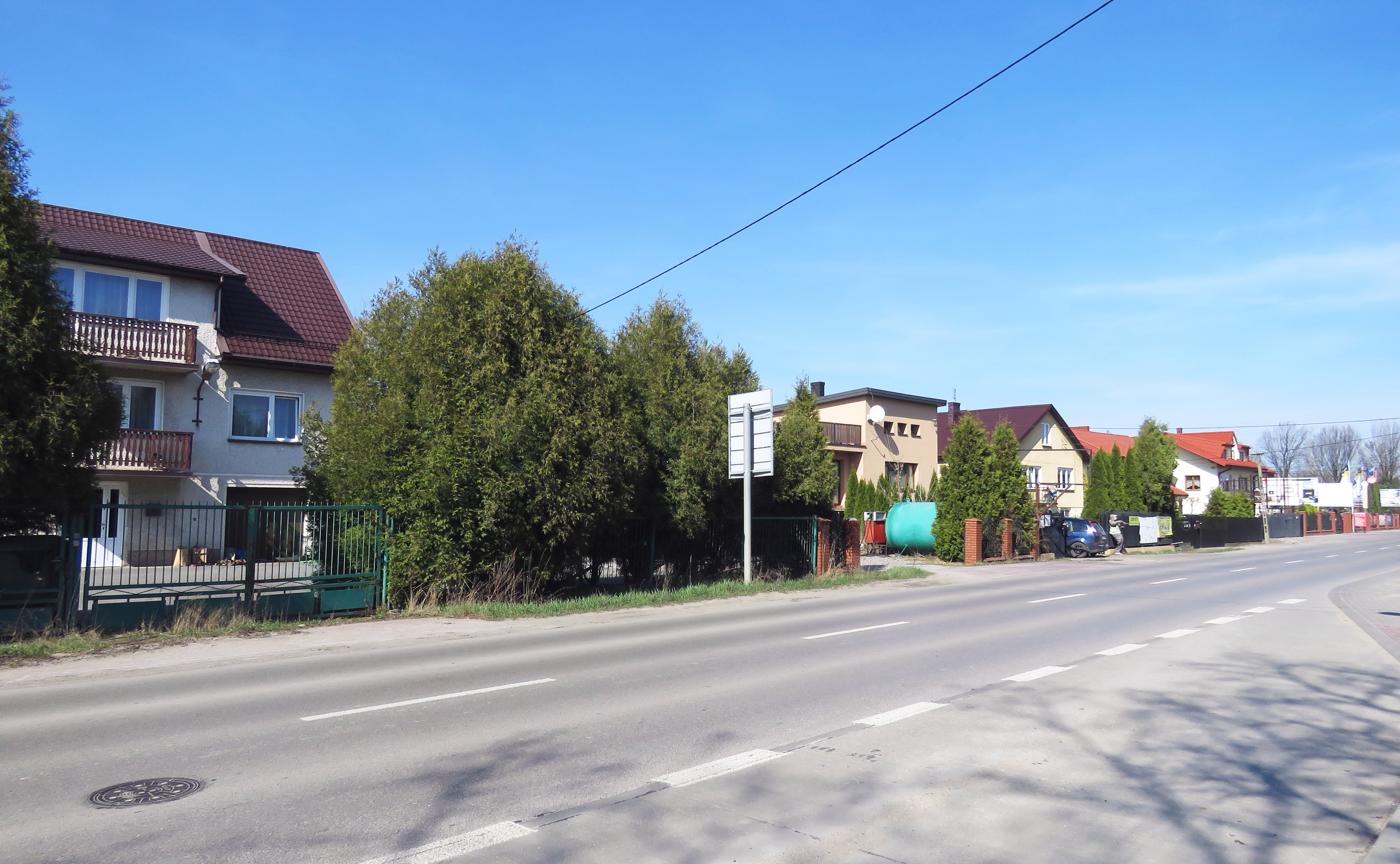

- Location within Poland
- Coordinates: 52°3′N 20°59′E
- Country: Poland
- Voivodeship: Masovian
- County: Piaseczno
- Gmina: Piaseczno
- Time zone: UTC+1 (CET)
  - Summer (DST): UTC+2 (CEST)
- Vehicle registration: WPI

Gołków [ˈɡɔu̯kuf] is a village in the administrative district of Gmina Piaseczno, within Piaseczno County, Masovian Voivodeship, in the Warsaw metropolitan area, in east-central Poland.

== History ==
On 9 July 1794 it was the site of the Battle of Gołków, fought in the early stages of the Kościuszko Uprising

Nine Polish citizens were murdered by Nazi Germany in the village during World War II.
