= Chojnów Landscape Park =

Protected area in east-central Poland

Coordinates: 52°03′49″N 21°06′40″E

- Chojnowski Park Krajobrazowy
- IUCN category V (protected landscape/seascape)
- Interactive map of Chojnów Landscape Park
- Location: Masovian Voivodeship
- Area: 67.96 km^{2} (26.24 sq mi)
- Established: 1993

Chojnów Landscape Park (Chojnowski Park Krajobrazowy) is a protected area (Landscape Park) in east-central Poland, established in 1993, covering an area of 67.96553 square kilometres (26.24164 sq mi). It consists chiefly of the Chojnów forests (Lasy Chojnowskie) south of Warsaw, named after the village of Chojnów.

The Park lies within Masovian Voivodeship, in Piaseczno County (Gmina Piaseczno, Gmina Konstancin-Jeziorna, Gmina Prażmów, Gmina Tarczyn). Since 2010, it has been part of the Masovian Landscape Park Complex, along with the Mazowiecki, Brudzeński, Kozienicki and Nadbużański landscape parks (with which he previously formed the ensemble). It is an element of the Green Ring of Warsaw and the protected areas belt stretching from the Mazowiecki Landscape Park to the Bolimów Landscape Park.

Within the Landscape Park are 11 nature reserves.

== Gallery ==
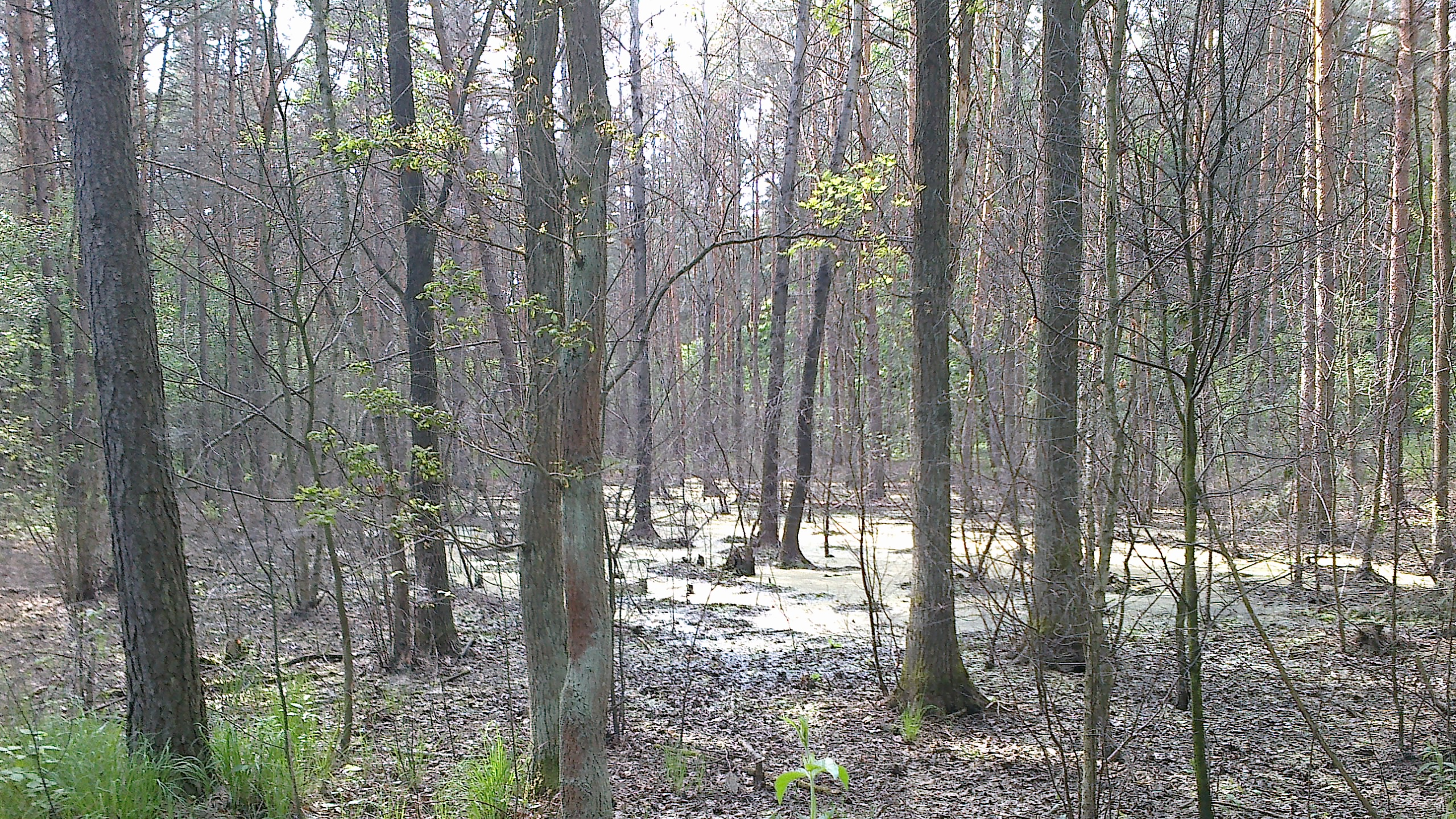
Chojnów Landscape Park

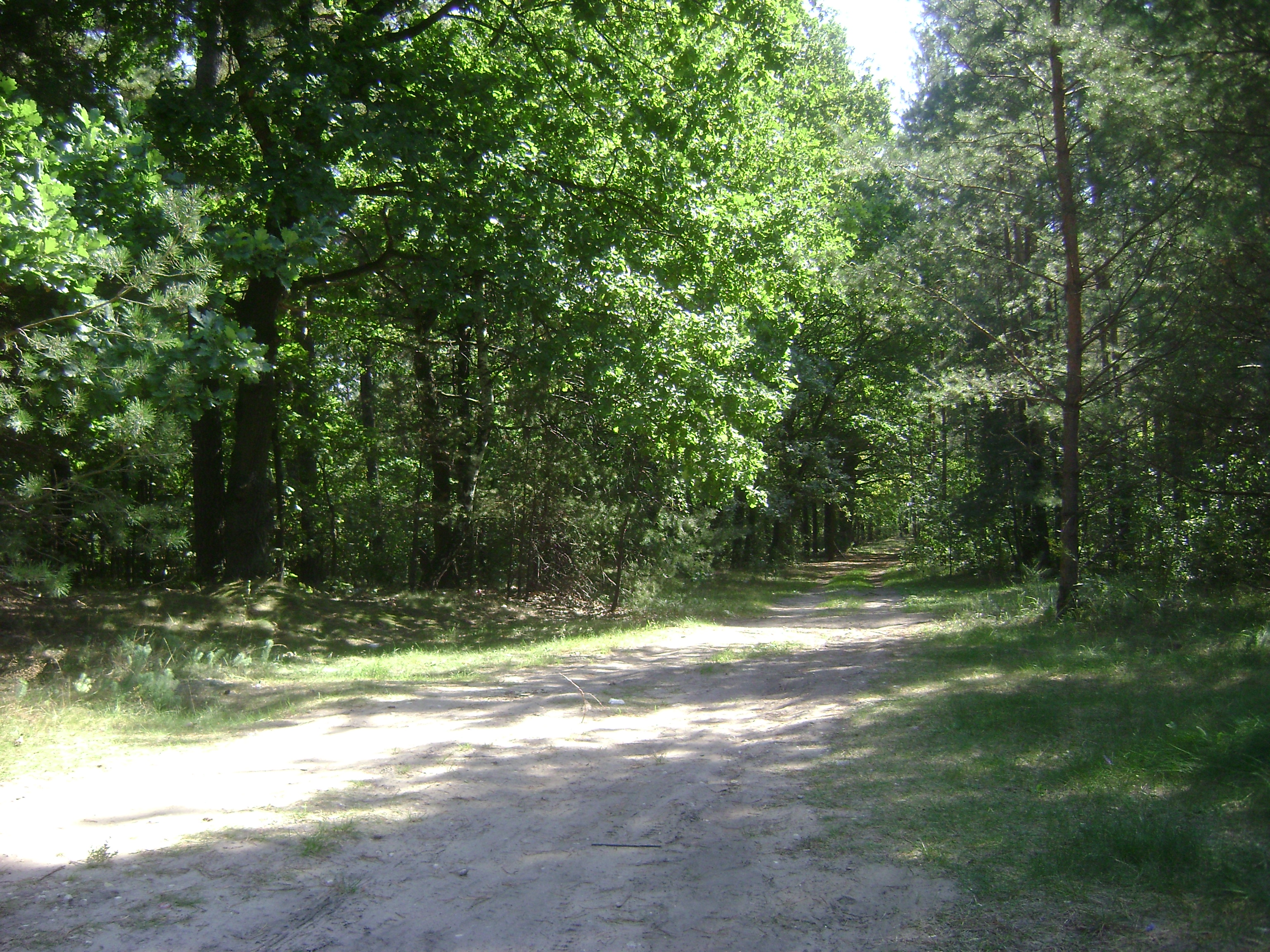
Chojnów Landscape Park

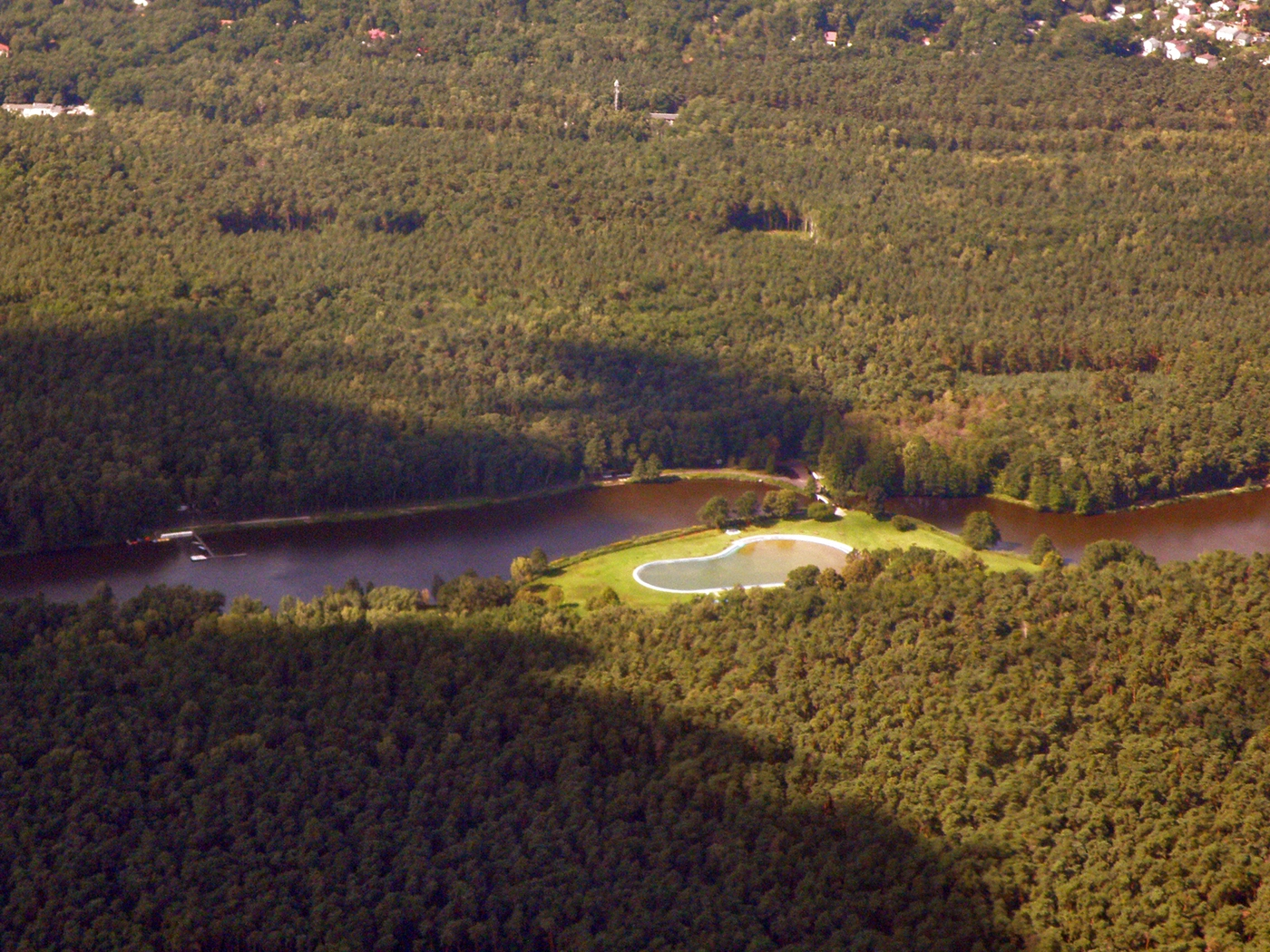
Air photo of Chojnów Park
