= Wólka Kozodawska =

- Village
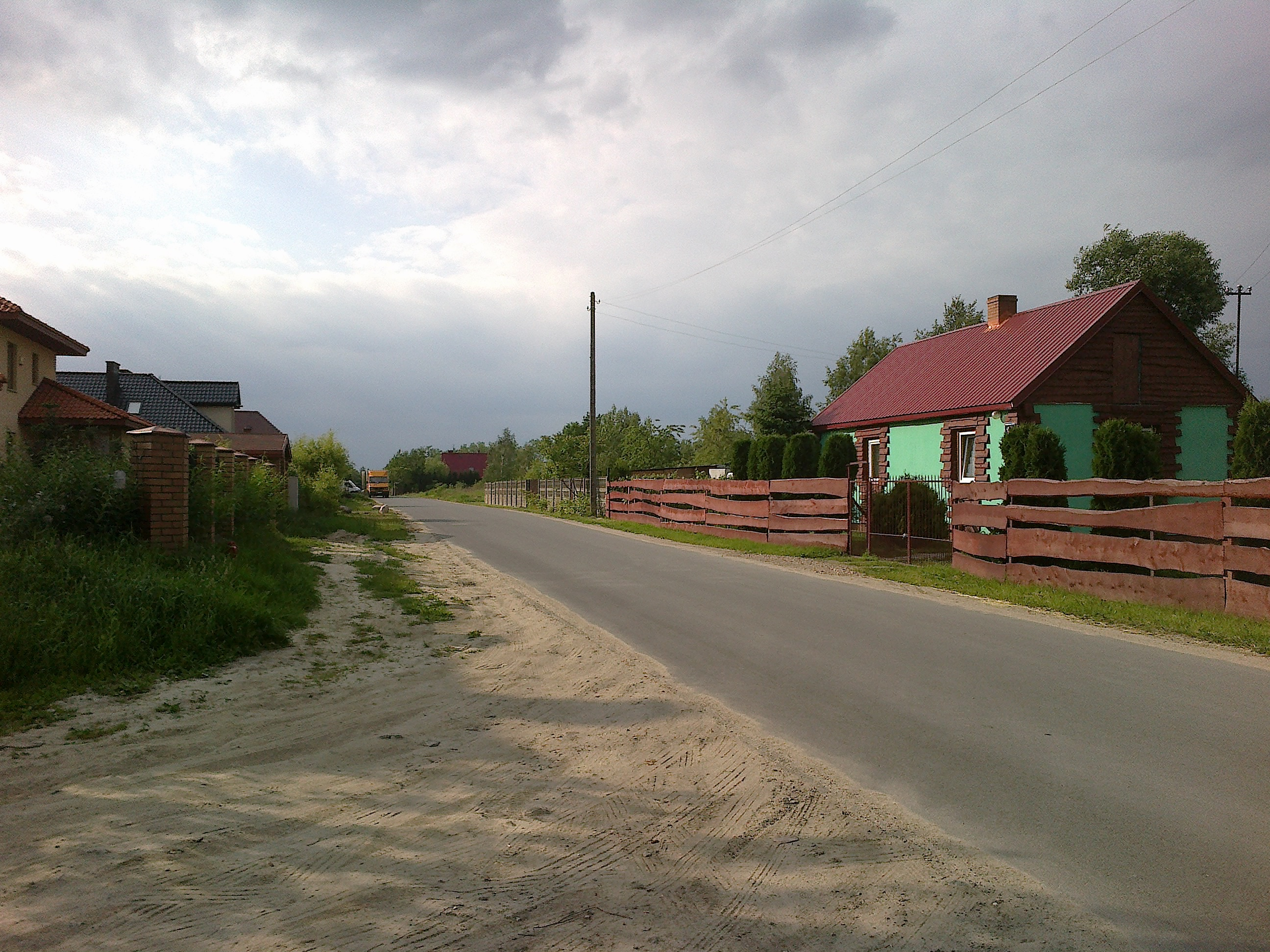

- Location within Poland
- Coordinates: 52°02′22.98″N 21°00′22.64″E
- Country: Poland
- Voivodeship: Masovian
- County: Piaseczno
- Gmina: Piaseczno

Wólka Kozodawska [ˈvulka kɔzɔˈdafska] is a village in the administrative district of Gmina Piaseczno, within Piaseczno County, Masovian Voivodeship, in east-central Poland.
