= Głosków-Letnisko =

- Village
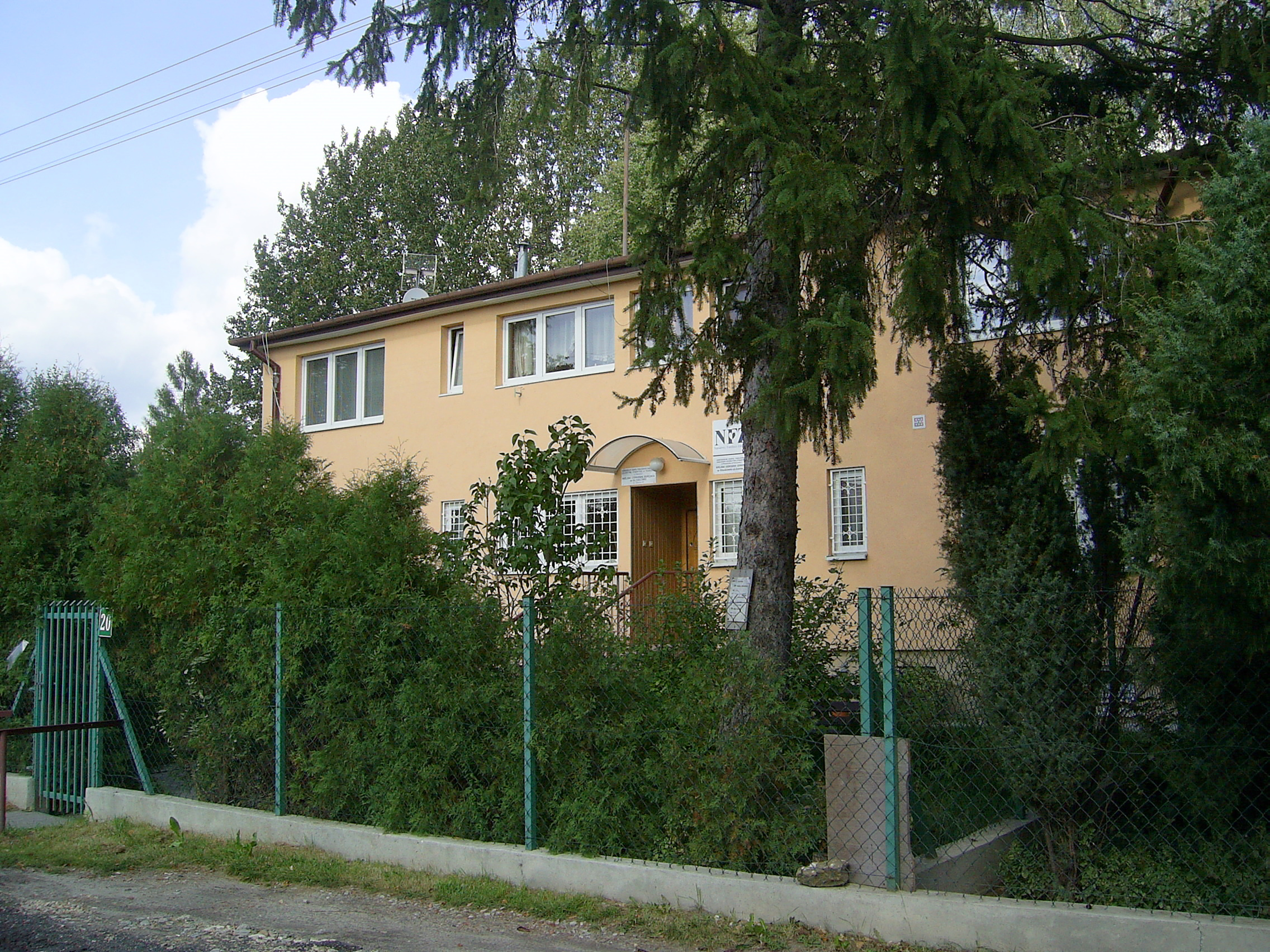
- Clinic in Głosków-Letnisko

- Location within Poland
- Coordinates: 52°02′07″N 20°57′43″E
- Country: Poland
- Voivodeship: Masovian
- County: Piaseczno
- Gmina: Piaseczno

Głosków-Letnisko [ˈɡwɔskuf lɛtˈniskɔ] is a village in the administrative district of Gmina Piaseczno, within Piaseczno County, Masovian Voivodeship, in east-central Poland.
