= Henryków-Urocze =

- Village
- Location within Poland
- Coordinates: 52°0′N 20°56′E
- Country: Poland
- Voivodeship: Masovian
- County: Piaseczno
- Gmina: Piaseczno

Henryków-Urocze [xɛnˈrɨkuf uˈrɔt͡ʂɛ] is a village in the administrative district of Gmina Piaseczno, within Piaseczno County, Masovian Voivodeship, in east-central Poland.
