= Bąkówka =

- Village
- Location within Poland
- Coordinates: 52°2′37″N 20°57′6″E
- Country: Poland
- Voivodeship: Masovian
- County: Piaseczno
- Gmina: Piaseczno

Bąkówka [bɔnˈkufka] is a village in the administrative district of Gmina Piaseczno, within Piaseczno County, Masovian Voivodeship, in east-central Poland.
