= Mieszkowo, Masovian Voivodeship =

Mieszkowo
- Village
- Location within Poland
- Coordinates: 52°03′50″N 20°54′06″E
- Country: Poland
- Voivodeship: Masovian
- County: Piaseczno
- Gmina: Piaseczno

Mieszkowo [mjɛʂˈkɔvɔ] is a village in the administrative district of Gmina Piaseczno, within Piaseczno County, Masovian Voivodeship, in east-central Poland.
