= Julianów, Gmina Piaseczno =

Julianów
- Village
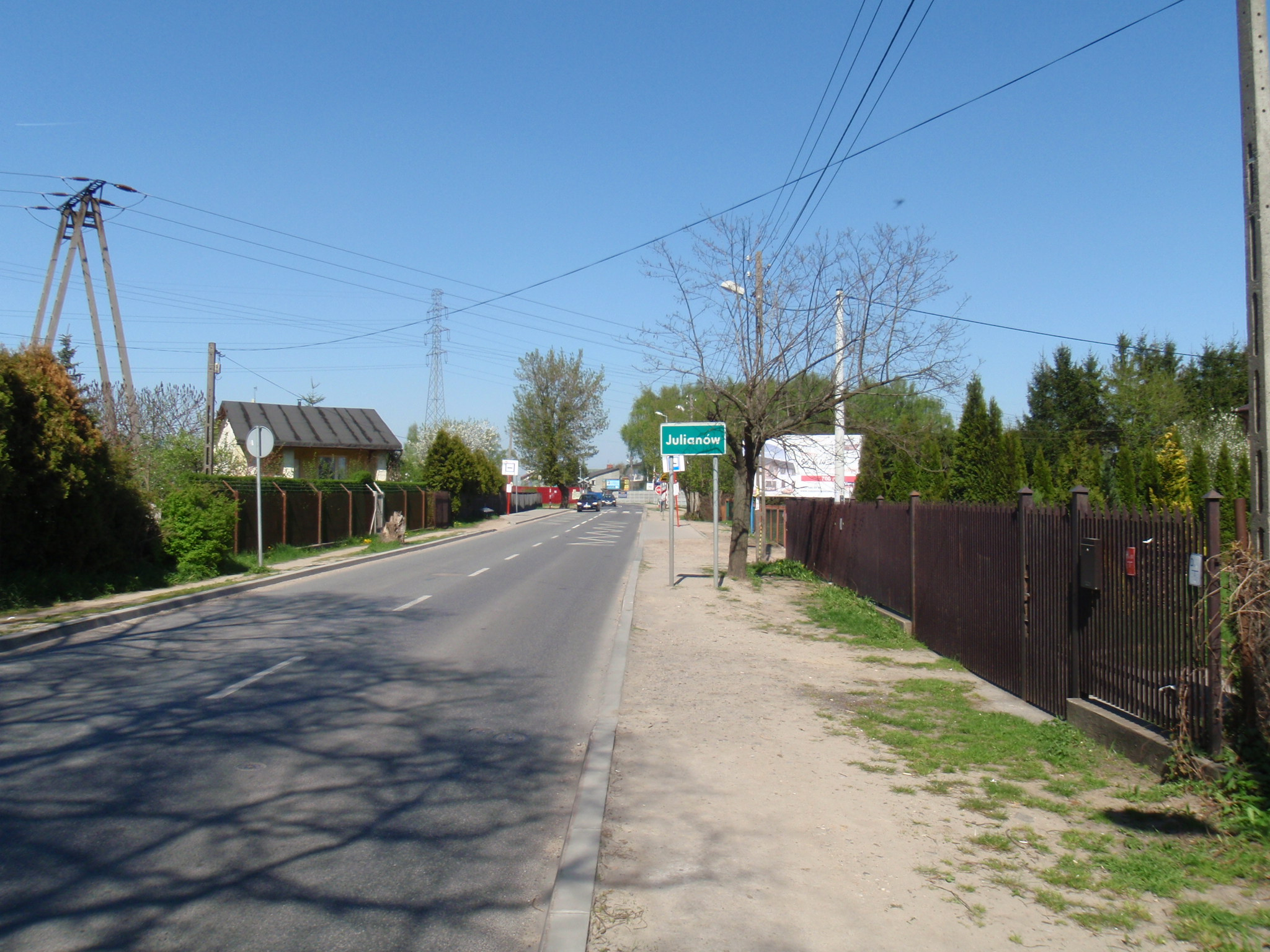
- Street and road sign of Julianów

- Location within Poland
- Coordinates: 52°5′42″N 21°3′7″E
- Country: Poland
- Voivodeship: Masovian
- County: Piaseczno
- Gmina: Piaseczno
- Time zone: UTC+1 (CET)
  - Summer (DST): UTC+2 (CEST)
- Vehicle registration: WPI

Julianów [juˈljanuf] is a village in the administrative district of Gmina Piaseczno, within Piaseczno County, Masovian Voivodeship, in the Warsaw metropolitan area, in east-central Poland.
