= Nowinki, Piaseczno County =

Nowinki
- Village
- Location within Poland
- Coordinates: 52°0′11″N 21°4′11″E
- Country: Poland
- Voivodeship: Masovian
- County: Piaseczno
- Gmina: Piaseczno

Nowinki [nɔˈviŋki] is a village in the administrative district of Gmina Piaseczno, within Piaseczno County, Masovian Voivodeship, in east-central Poland.
