= Chylice, Piaseczno County =

Chylice
- Village
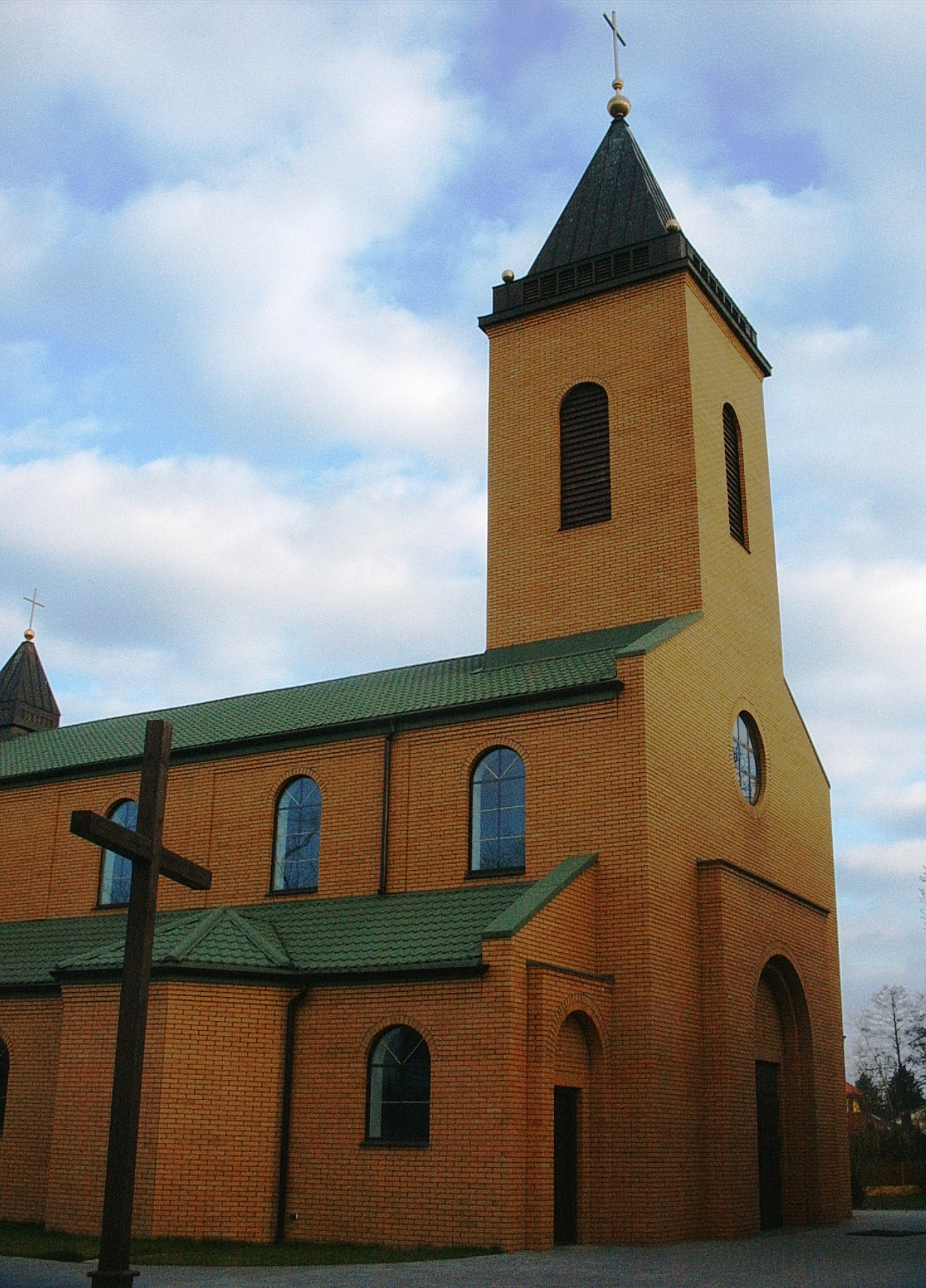
- Church

- Location within Poland
- Coordinates: 52°5′N 21°5′E
- Country: Poland
- Voivodeship: Masovian
- County: Piaseczno
- Gmina: Piaseczno
- Time zone: UTC+1 (CET)
  - Summer (DST): UTC+2 (CEST)
- Vehicle registration: WPI

Chylice [xɨˈlit͡sɛ] German: Hylitz is a village in the administrative district of Gmina Piaseczno, within Piaseczno County, Masovian Voivodeship, in east-central Poland.

== History ==
12 Polish citizens were murdered by Nazi Germany in the village during World War II.
