= Pólko, Piaseczno County =

Pólko
- Village
- Location within Poland
- Coordinates: 52°04′33″N 21°03′16″E
- Country: Poland
- Voivodeship: Masovian
- County: Piaseczno
- Gmina: Piaseczno

Pólko [ˈpulkɔ] is a village in the administrative district of Gmina Piaseczno, within Piaseczno County, Masovian Voivodeship, in east-central Poland.
