= Szczaki =

- Village
- Location within Poland
- Coordinates: 52°1′N 20°53′E
- Country: Poland
- Voivodeship: Masovian
- County: Piaseczno
- Gmina: Piaseczno
- Website: http://www.szczaki.pl

Szczaki [ˈʂt͡ʂaki] is a village in the administrative district of Gmina Piaseczno, within Piaseczno County, Masovian Voivodeship, in east-central Poland.
