= Gmina Piaseczno =

Gmina Piaseczno Piaseczno Commune
- Gmina
- Flag Coat of arms
- Interactive map of Gmina Piaseczno
- Coordinates (Piaseczno): 52°4′0″N 21°1′0″E
- Country: Poland
- Voivodeship: Masovian
- County: Piaseczno
- Seat: Piaseczno

Area
  - Total: 128.22 km^{2} (49.51 sq mi)

Population (2016)
  - Total: 76,323
  - Density: 595.25/km^{2} (1,541.7/sq mi)
  - Urban: 44,066
  - Rural: 32,257
- Website: http://www.piaseczno.eu/

Gmina Piaseczno is an urban-rural gmina (administrative district) in Piaseczno County, Masovian Voivodeship, in east-central Poland. Its seat is the town of Piaseczno, which lies approximately 17 kilometres (11 mi) south of Warsaw.

The gmina covers an area of 128.22 square kilometres (49.5 sq mi), and as of 2016 its total population is 76,323 (out of which the population of Piaseczno amounts to 44,066, and the population of the rural part of the gmina is 32,257).

The gmina contains part of the protected area called Chojnów Landscape Park.

== Villages ==
Apart from the town of Piaseczno, Gmina Piaseczno contains the villages and settlements of Antoninów, Bąkówka, Baszkówka, Bobrowiec, Bogatki, Chojnów, Chylice, Chyliczki, Głosków, Głosków-Letnisko, Gołków, Grochowa, Henryków-Urocze, Jastrzębie, Jazgarzew, Jesówka, Józefosław, Julianów, Kamionka, Kuleszówka, Łbiska, Mieszkowo, Nowinki, Orzeszyn, Pęchery, Pęchery-Łbiska, Pilawa, Pólko, Robercin, Runów, Runów-Osada, Siedliska, Szczaki, Wola Gołkowska, Wólka Kozodawska, Wólka Pęcherska, Wólka Pracka, Żabieniec, Zalesie Górne and Złotokłos.

== Neighbouring gminas ==
Gmina Piaseczno is bordered by the city of Warsaw and by the gminas of Góra Kalwaria, Konstancin-Jeziorna, Lesznowola, Prażmów and Tarczyn.
