= Wola Gołkowska =

- Village
- Location within Poland
- Coordinates: 52°3′N 20°56′E
- Country: Poland
- Voivodeship: Masovian
- County: Piaseczno
- Gmina: Piaseczno

Wola Gołkowska [ˈvɔla ɡɔu̯ˈkɔfska] is a village in the administrative district of Gmina Piaseczno, within Piaseczno County, Masovian Voivodeship, in east-central Poland.
