= Wólka Pęcherska =

- Village
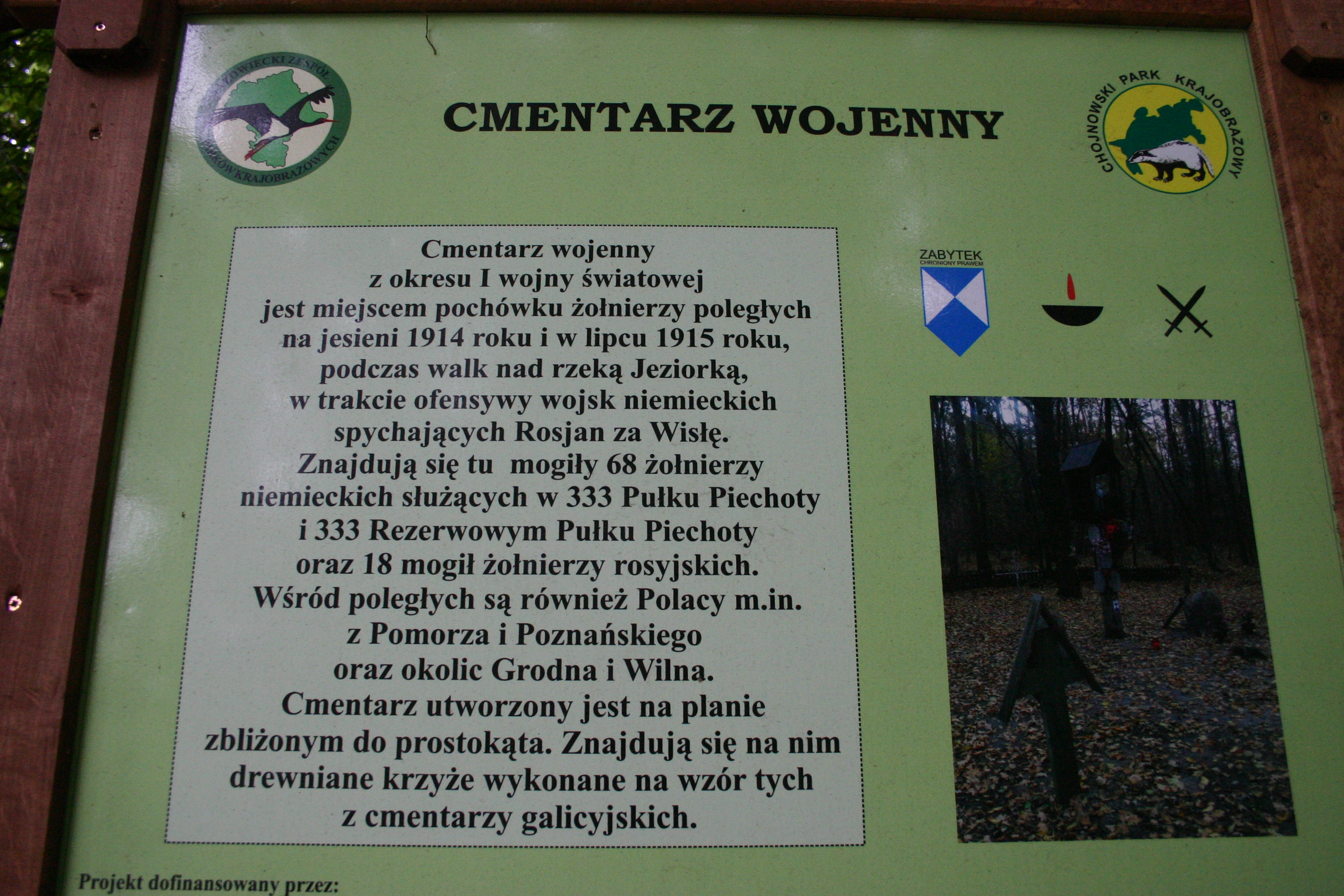

- Location within Poland
- Coordinates: 52°01′50″N 20°58′56″E
- Country: Poland
- Voivodeship: Masovian
- County: Piaseczno
- Gmina: Piaseczno

Wólka Pęcherska [ˈvulka pɛ̃ˈxɛrska] is a village in the administrative district of Gmina Piaseczno, within Piaseczno County, Masovian Voivodeship, in east-central Poland.
