= Głosków, Piaseczno County =

Głosków
- Village
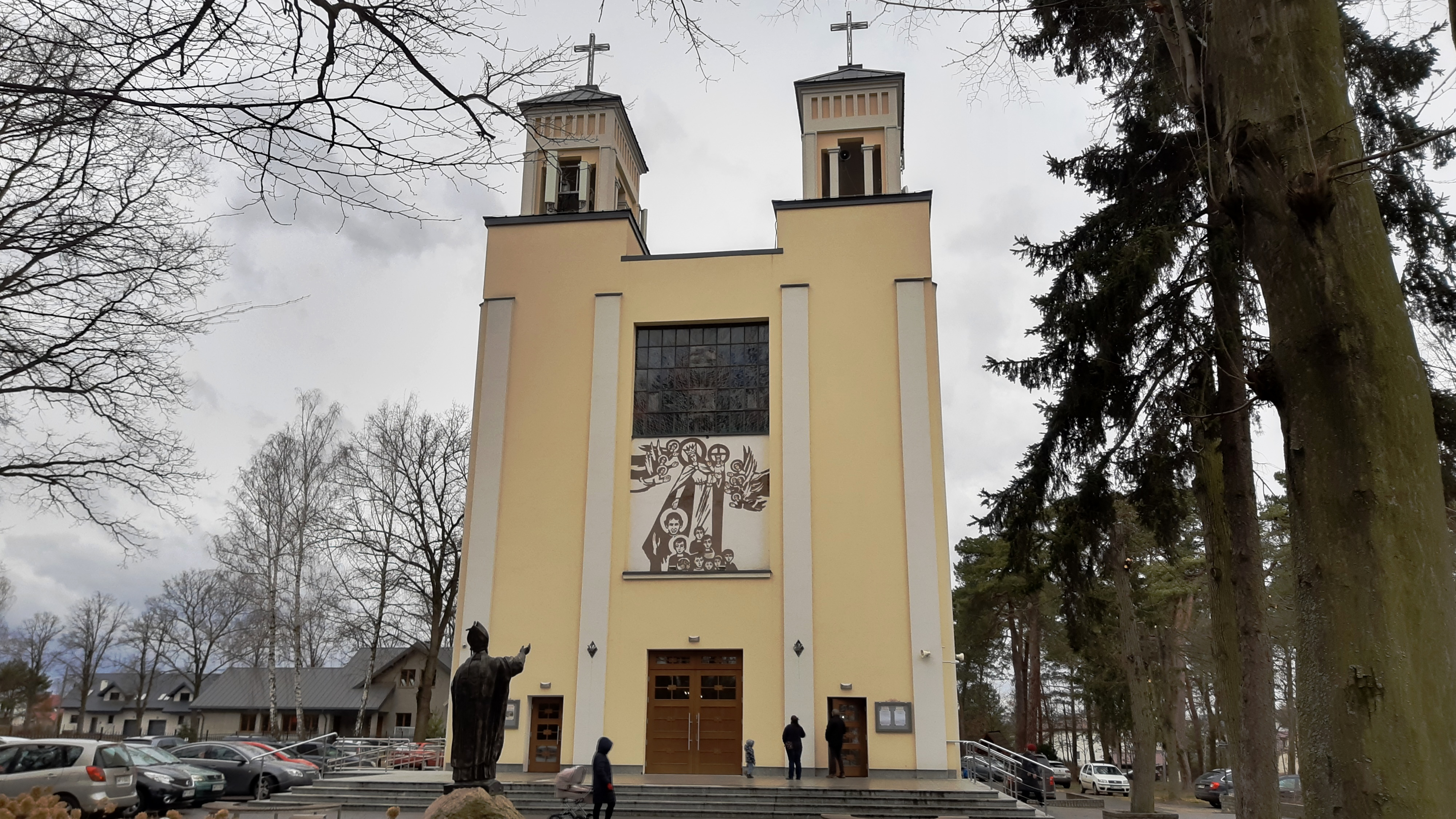
- Church of Our Lady Help of Christians

- Location within Poland
- Coordinates: 52°2′N 20°56′E
- Country: Poland
- Voivodeship: Masovian
- County: Piaseczno
- Gmina: Piaseczno
- Website: http://www.gloskow.eu

Głosków [ˈɡwɔskuf] is a village in the administrative district of Gmina Piaseczno, within Piaseczno County, Masovian Voivodeship, in east-central Poland.
