= Wólka Pracka =

- Village
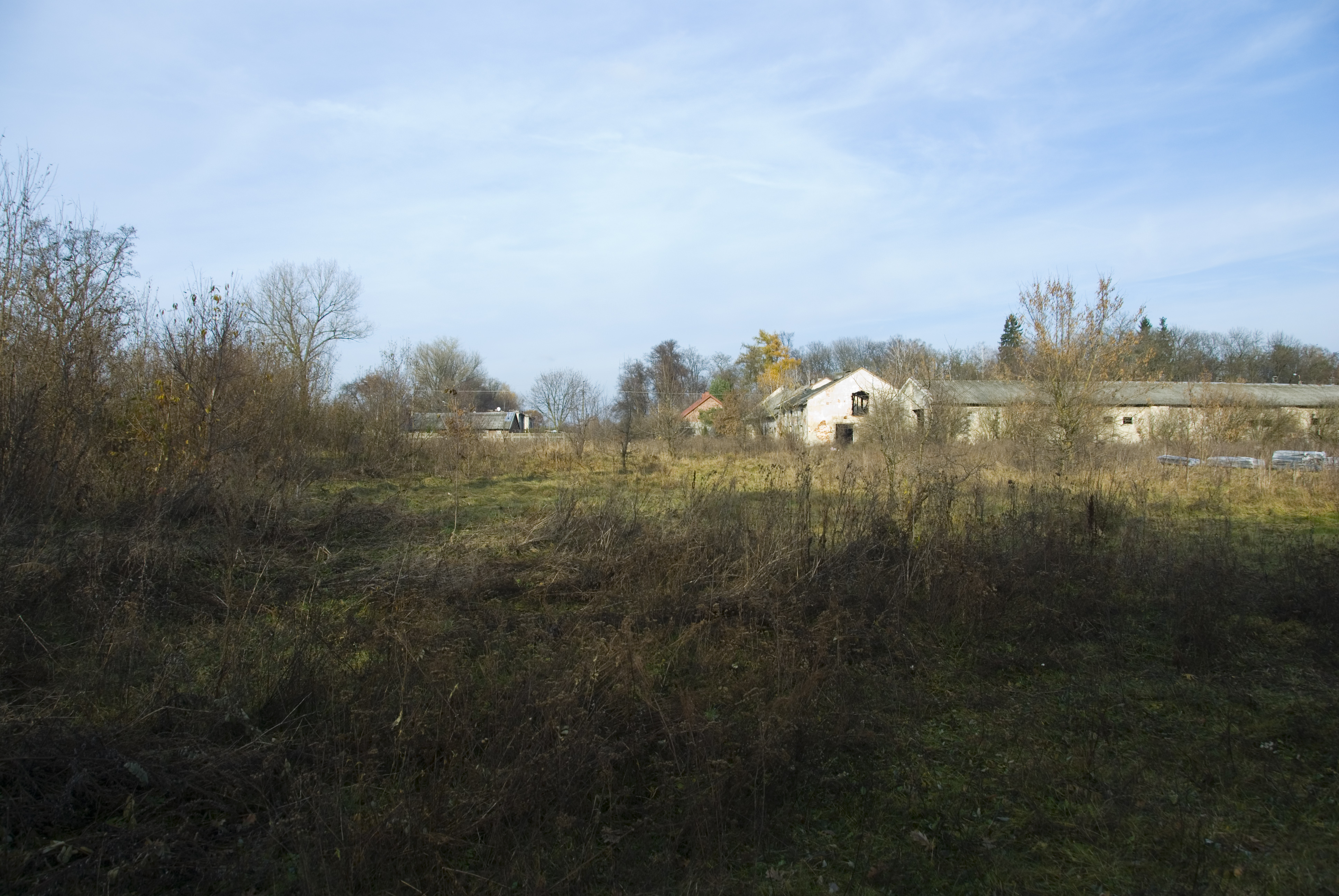

- Location within Poland
- Coordinates: 52°01′29″N 20°54′30″E
- Country: Poland
- Voivodeship: Masovian
- County: Piaseczno
- Gmina: Piaseczno

Wólka Pracka [ˈvulka ˈprat͡ska] is a village in the administrative district of Gmina Piaseczno, within Piaseczno County, Masovian Voivodeship, in east-central Poland.
