= Józefosław =

- Village
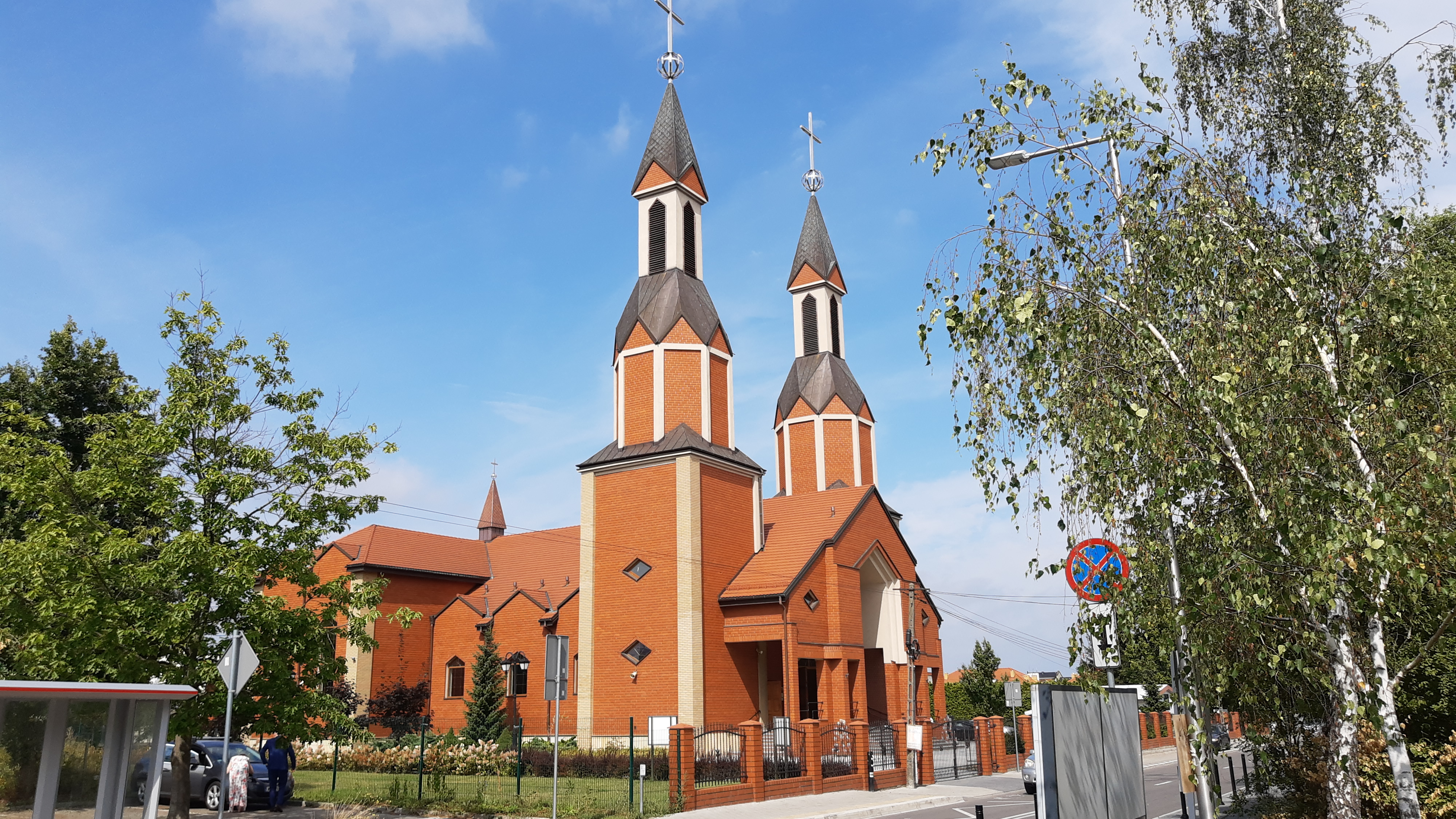
- The Roman Catholic Parish of St. Joseph Guardian of Labor in Józefosław

- Location within Poland
- Coordinates: 52°6′25″N 21°2′21″E
- Country: Poland
- Voivodeship: Masovian
- County: Piaseczno
- Gmina: Piaseczno
- Elevation: 86 m (282 ft)

Population (2021)
  - Total: 14 806
- Time zone: UTC+1 (CET)
  - Summer (DST): UTC+2 (CEST)
- Vehicle registration: WPI

Józefosław (Polish pronunciation: [juzɛˈfɔswaf]) is a village in the administrative district of Gmina Piaseczno, within Piaseczno County, Masovian Voivodeship, in the Warsaw metropolitan area, in east-central Poland. It currently has the largest population of any village in Poland.
