= Baszkówka =

- Village
- Location within Poland
- Coordinates: 52°02′05″N 20°55′17″E
- Country: Poland
- Voivodeship: Masovian
- County: Piaseczno
- Gmina: Piaseczno

Baszkówka [baʂˈkufka] is a village in the administrative district of Gmina Piaseczno, within Piaseczno County, Masovian Voivodeship, in east-central Poland.

On August 25, 1994, the village witnessed the fall of a stony meteorite.
