= Baszkówka (meteorite) =

Meteorite found in Poland

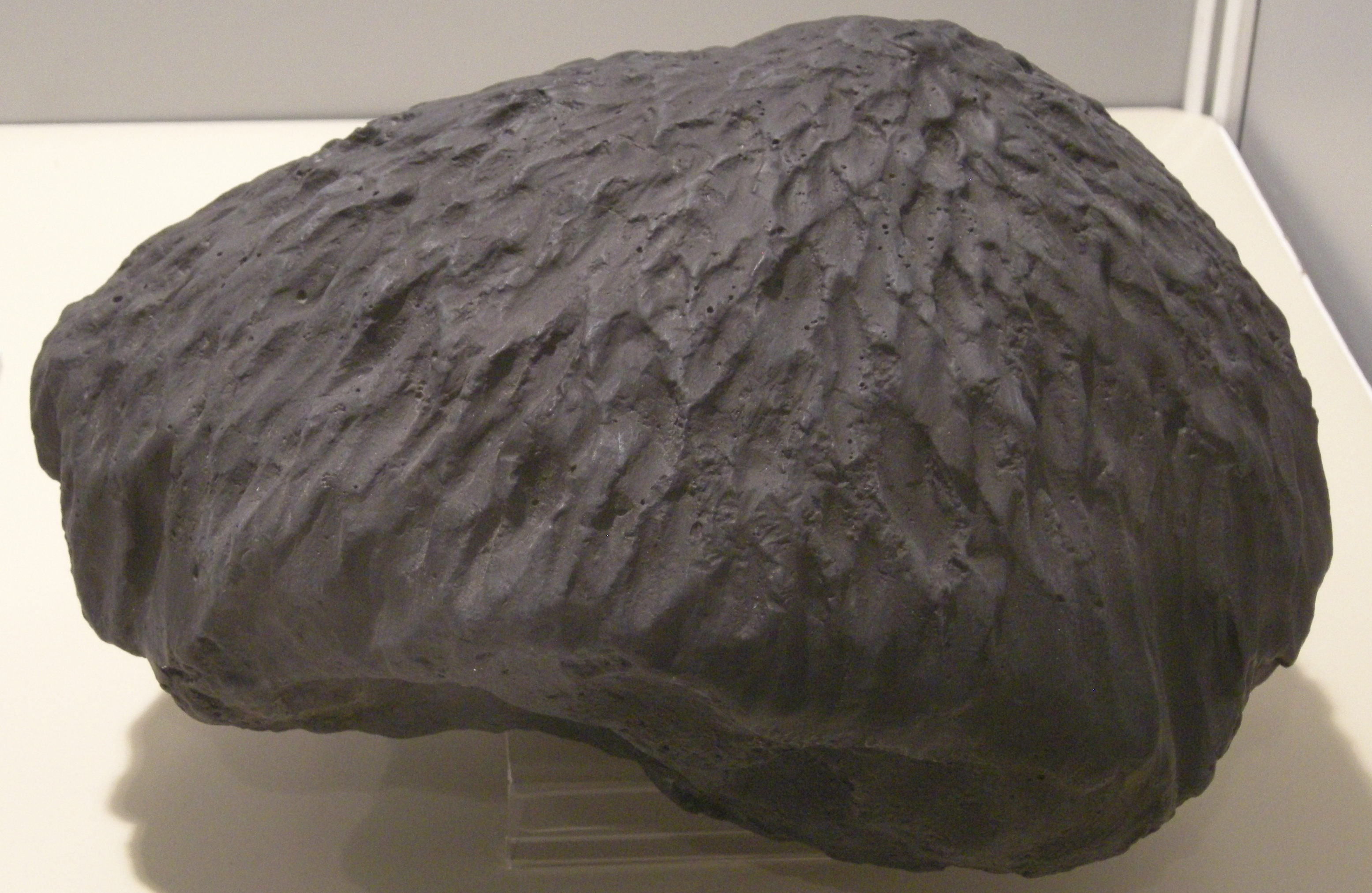
- Type: Chondrite
- Class: Ordinary chondrite
- Group: L5
- Country: Poland
- Region: Masovian
- Coordinates: 52°02′N 20°56′E
- Observed fall: Yes
- Fall date: August 25, 1994
- TKW: 15.63 kilograms (34 lb 7.3 oz)
- Related media on Wikimedia Commons

Baszkówka is an L5 ordinary chondrite meteorite which fell on 25 August 1994 in Baszkówka village, 23 kilometres (14 miles) SSW of Warsaw. The fall occurred at around 4:00 pm. Several people heard a sonic boom, and one woman witnessed a movement on the surface of cultivated land 200 metres (660 feet) away from her. A single specimen of a meteorite with radial regmaglypts was recovered immediately.

== See also ==
- Glossary of meteoritics
- Meteorite fall
