= Kuleszówka =

- Village
- Location within Poland
- Coordinates: 52°3′47″N 20°54′20″E
- Country: Poland
- Voivodeship: Masovian
- County: Piaseczno
- Gmina: Piaseczno

Kuleszówka [kulɛˈʂufka] is a village in the administrative district of Gmina Piaseczno, within Piaseczno County, Masovian Voivodeship, in east-central Poland.
