= Antoninów, Piaseczno County =

Antoninów
- Village
- Location within Poland
- Coordinates: 52°3′34″N 20°54′31″E
- Country: Poland
- Voivodeship: Masovian
- County: Piaseczno
- Gmina: Piaseczno

Antoninów [antɔˈninuf] is a village in the administrative district of Gmina Piaseczno, within Piaseczno County, Masovian Voivodeship, in east-central Poland.
