= Grochowa, Masovian Voivodeship =

Grochowa
- Village
- Location within Poland
- Coordinates: 52°0′N 20°59′E
- Country: Poland
- Voivodeship: Masovian
- County: Piaseczno
- Gmina: Piaseczno

Grochowa [ɡrɔˈxɔva] is a village in the administrative district of Gmina Piaseczno, within Piaseczno County, Masovian Voivodeship, in the east-central region of Poland.
