= Chojnów, Masovian Voivodeship =

Chojnów
- Village
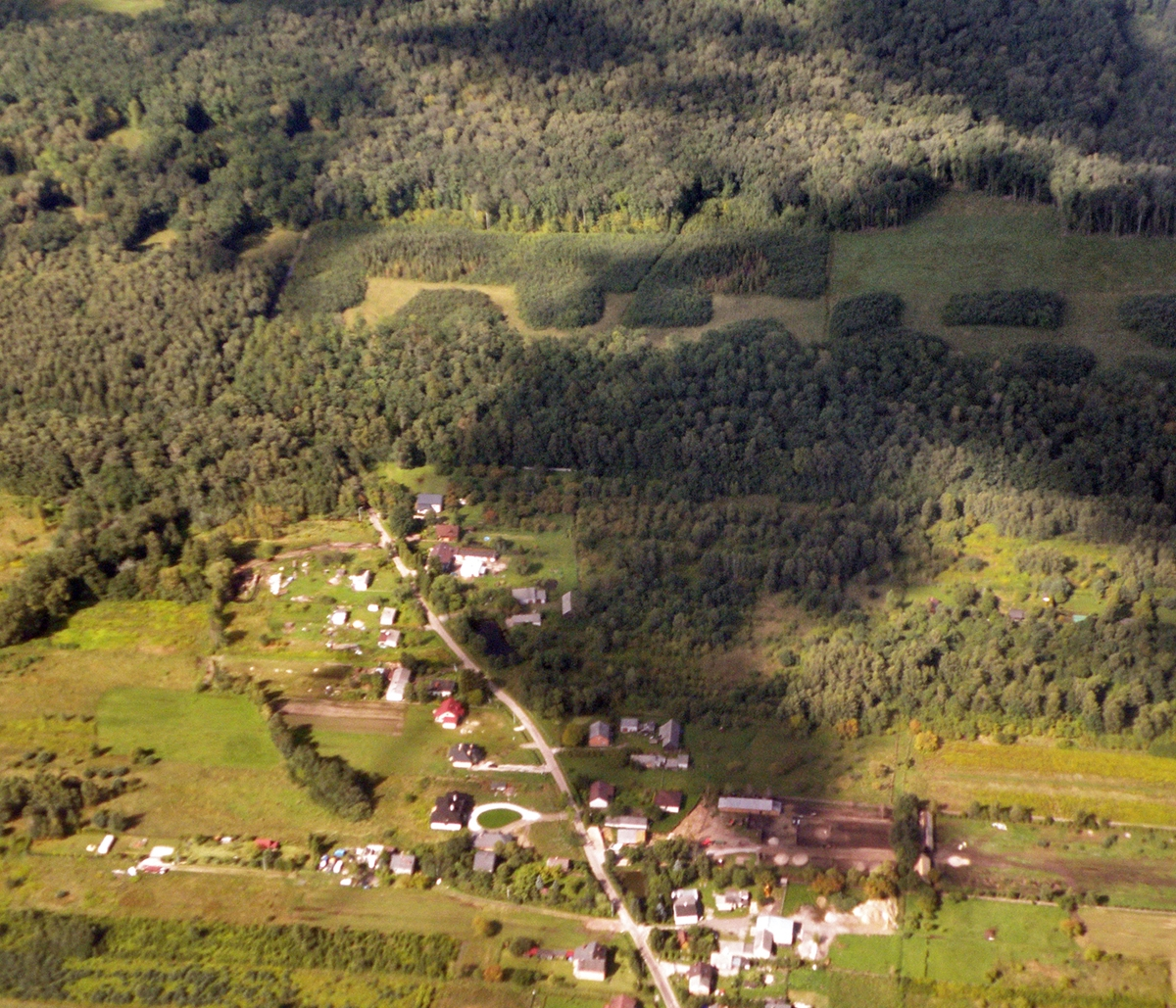
- Aerial view of Chojnów

- Location within Poland
- Coordinates: 52°1′N 21°5′E
- Country: Poland
- Voivodeship: Masovian
- County: Piaseczno
- Gmina: Piaseczno
- Time zone: UTC+1 (CET)
  - Summer (DST): UTC+2 (CEST)
- Postal code: 05-532
- Vehicle registration: WPI

Chojnów [ˈxɔi̯nuf] is a village in the administrative district of Gmina Piaseczno, within Piaseczno County, Masovian Voivodeship, in east-central Poland. It lies approximately 8 km (5 mi) south-east of Piaseczno and 23 km (14 mi) south of Warsaw.
