= Warsaw metropolitan area =

- Urban area
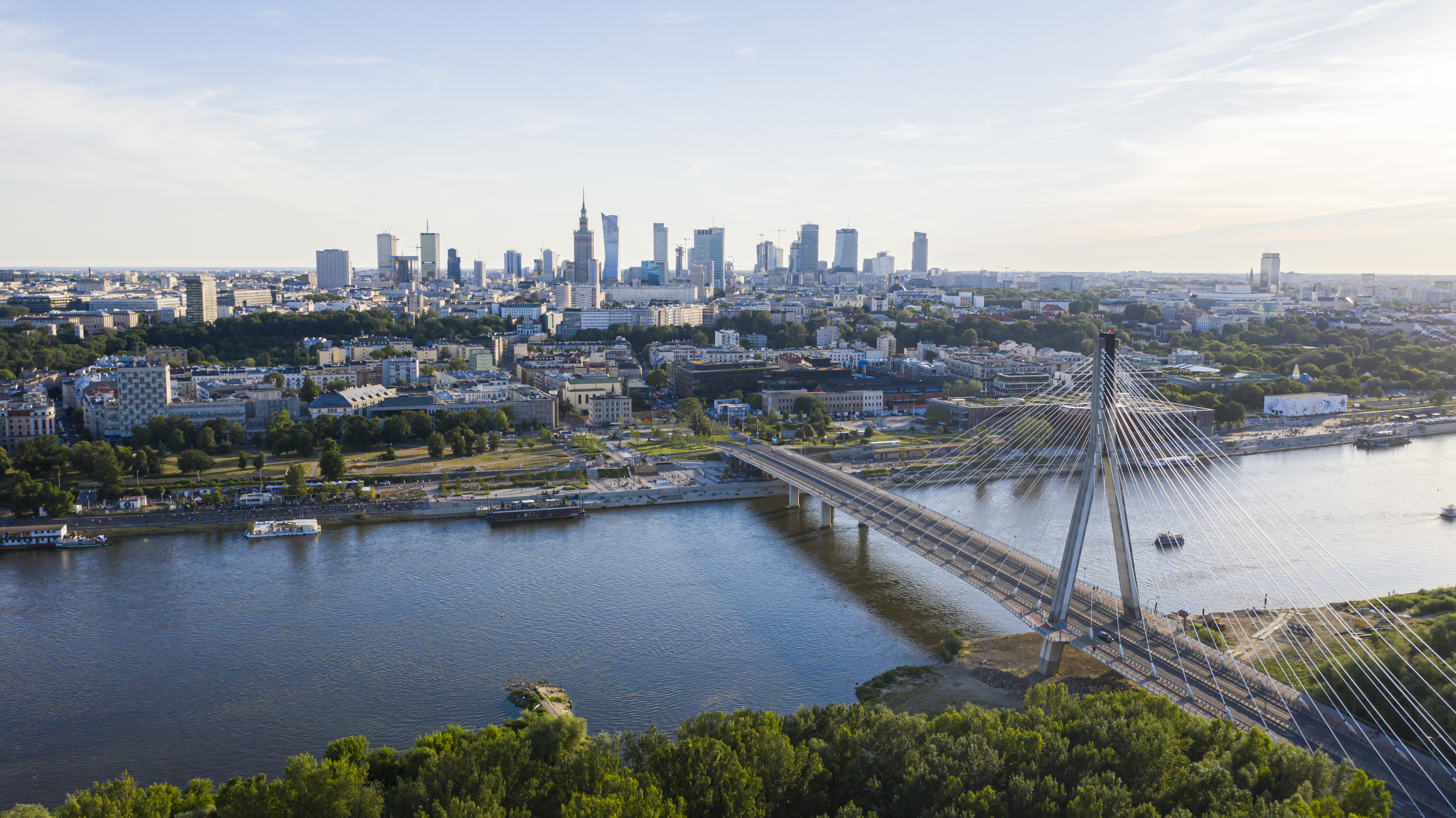
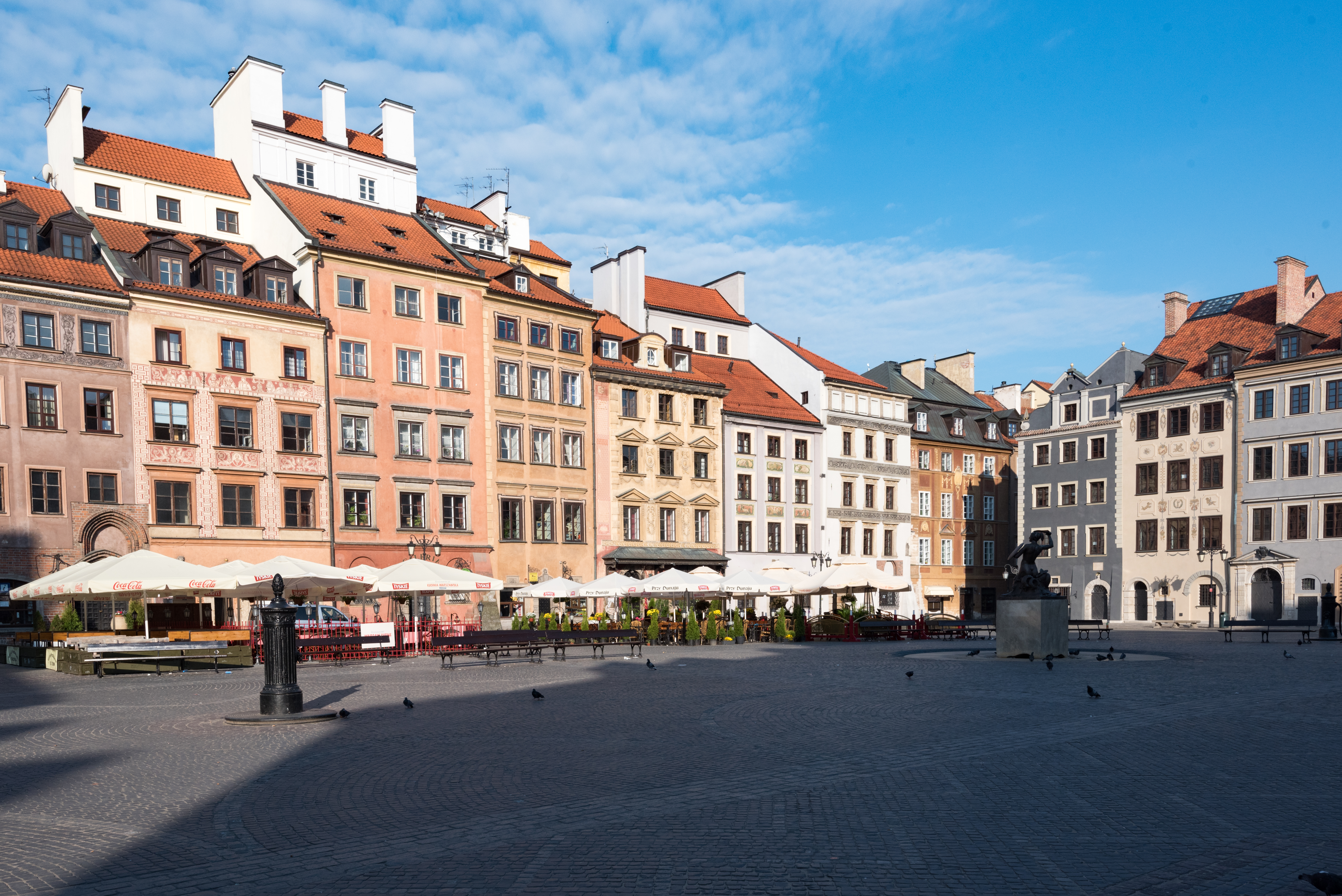
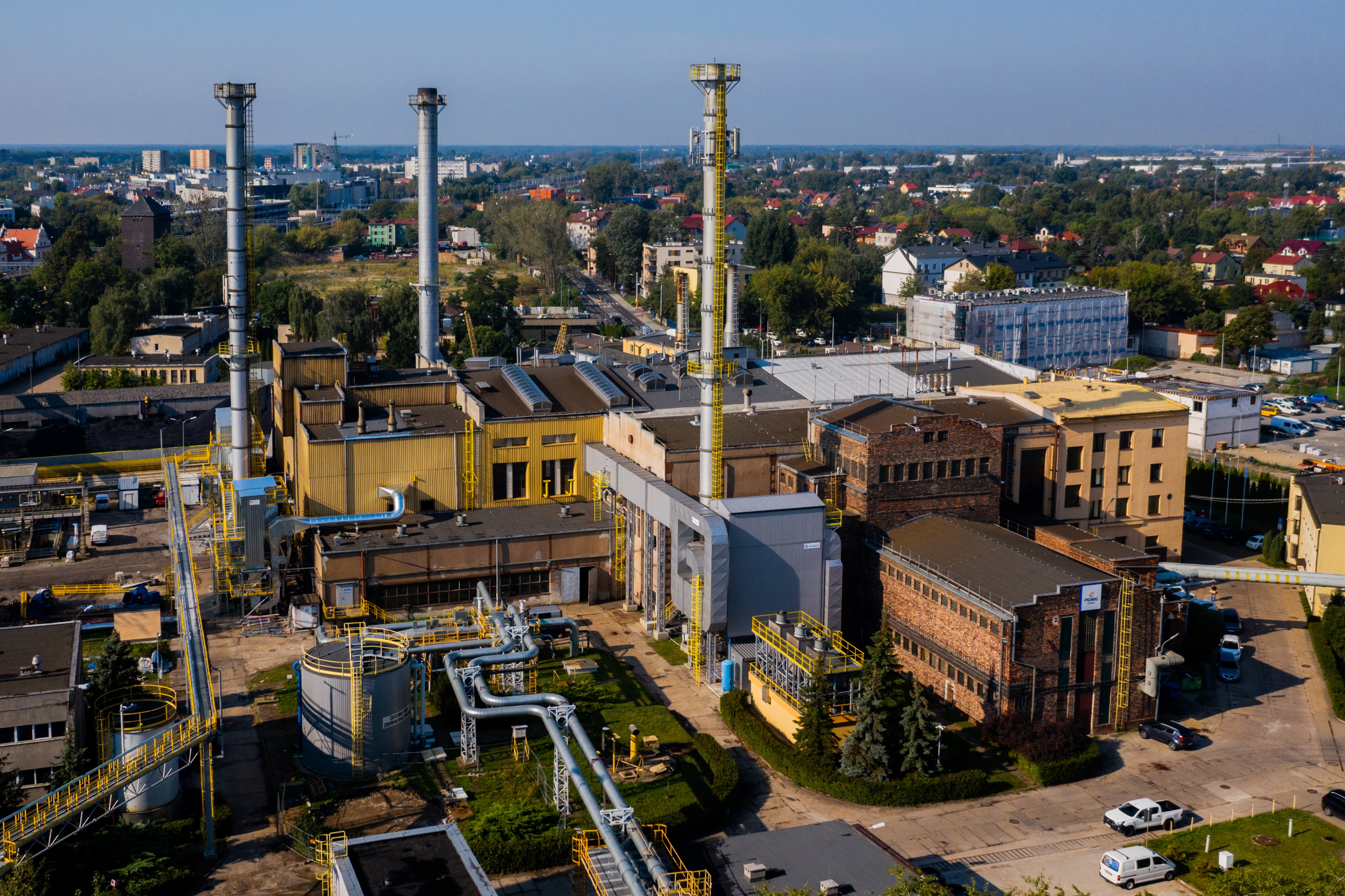
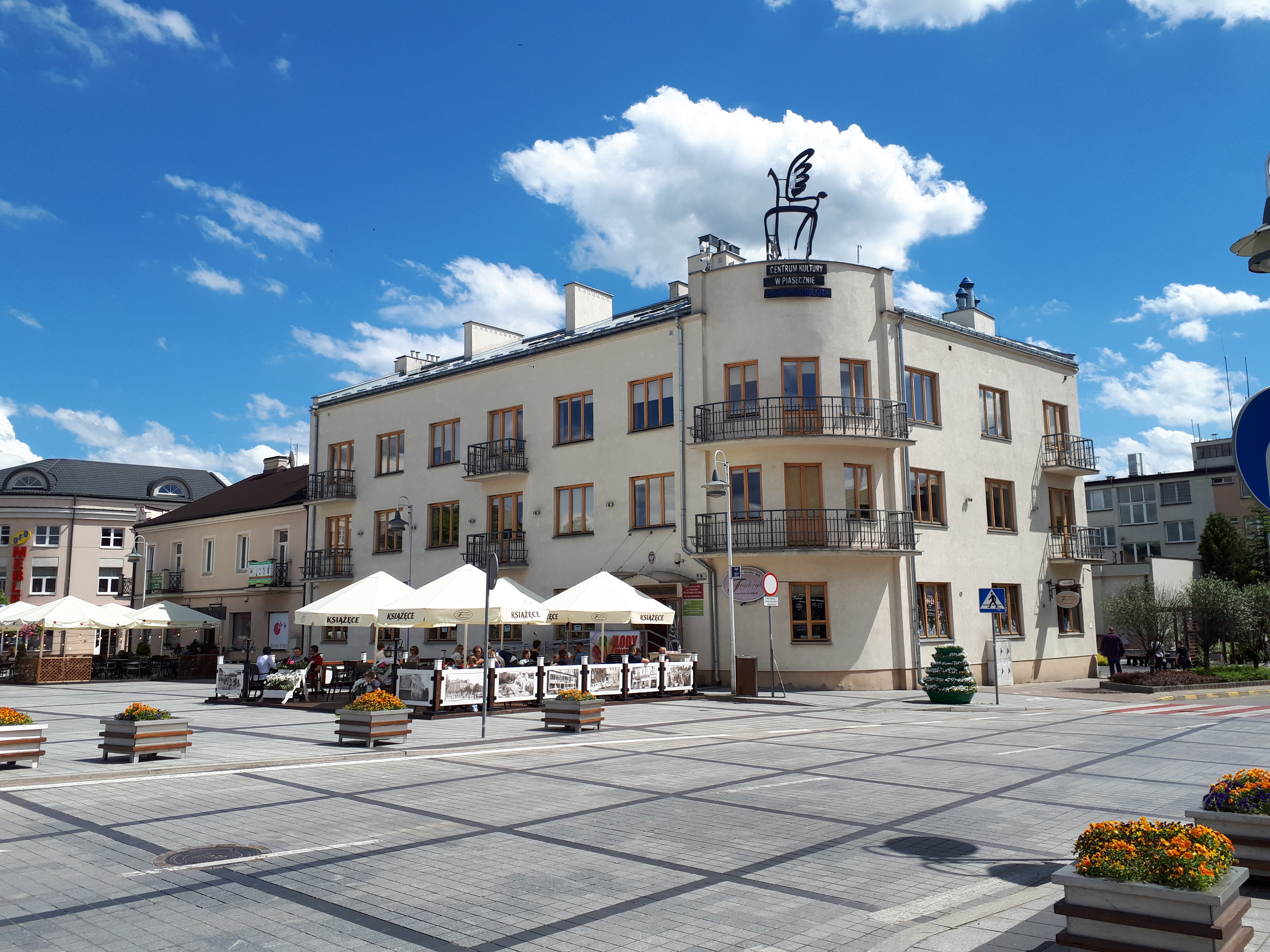
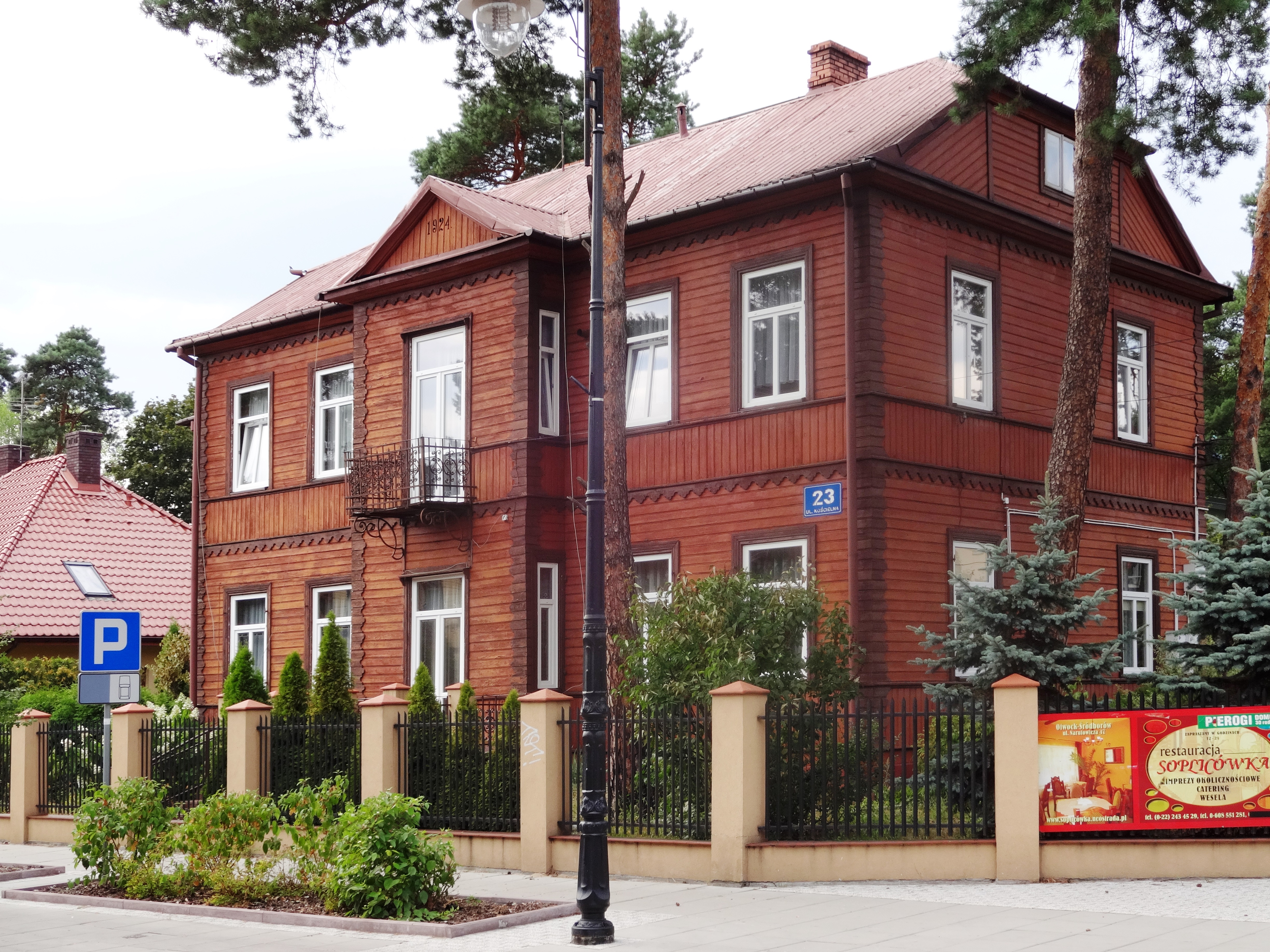
- From top, left to right: Skyline of Warsaw; Old Town Market Place in Warsaw; Power plant in Pruszków; Józef Piłsudski Square in Piaseczno; Świdermajer-styled house in Otwock

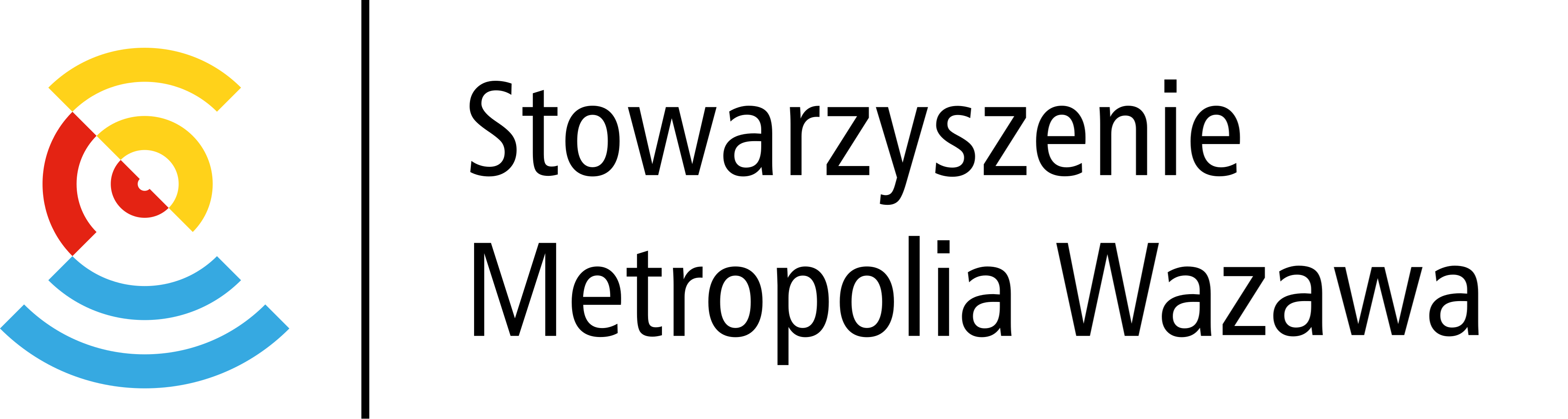

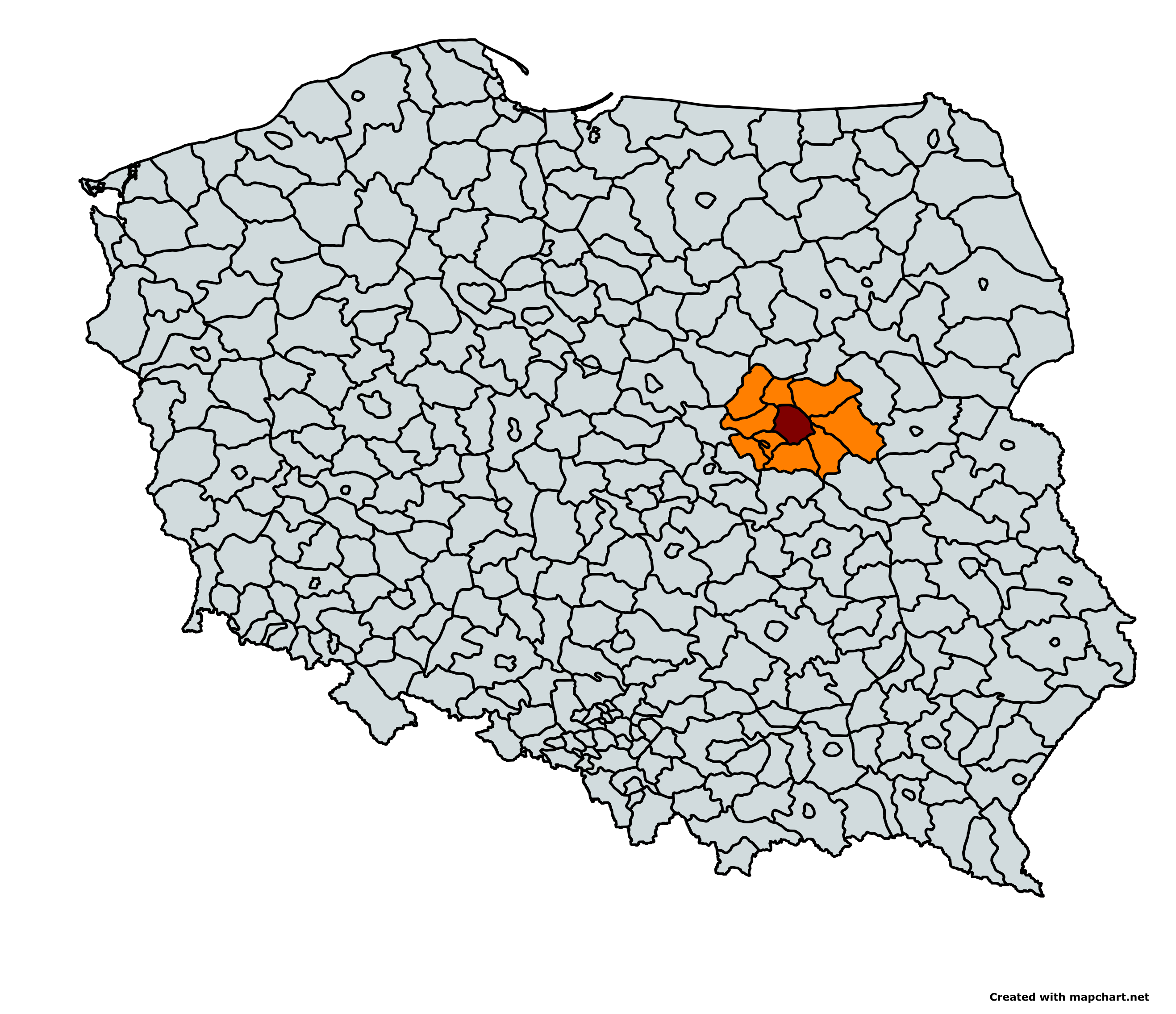
- Warsaw city; Surrounding counties
- Coordinates: 52°14′35″N 21°00′02″E
- Country: Poland
- Region: Masovian Voivodeship
- Largest city: Warsaw (1,860,281)

Area
  - Metro: 6,100 km^{2} (2,400 sq mi)

Population (2023)
  - Metro: 3,269,510 ▲
  - Metro density: 500.5/km^{2} (1,296.4/sq mi)

GDP
  - Metro: €156.556 billion US$336 billion (PPP) (2024)
  - Per capita: €47,884; US$102,759 (PPP) (2024)
- Time zone: UTC+1 (CET)
  - Summer (DST): UTC+2 (CEST)
- Website: omw.um.warszawa.pl

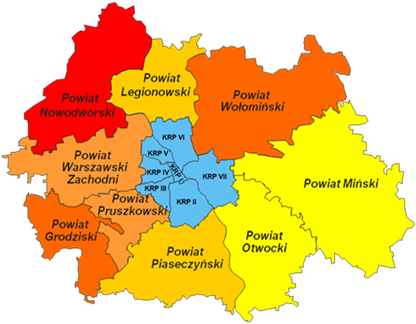
Divisions of police garrisons in Warsaw metropolitan area

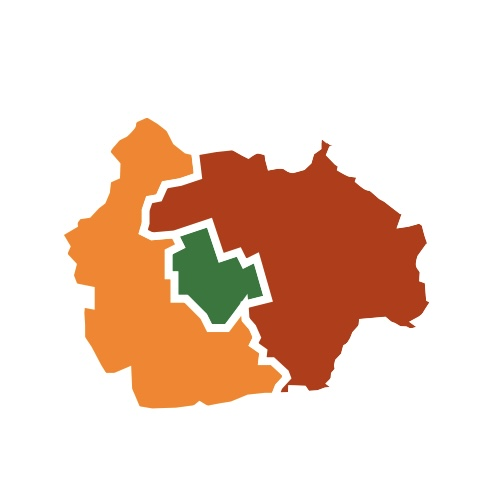
GDP distribution in Warsaw metropolitan area Warsaw City (€108.751 billion) Warsaw West (€18.191 billion) Warsaw East (€10.792 billion)

The Warsaw metropolitan area (known in Polish as: aglomeracja warszawska or Miejski Obszar Funkcjonalny Warszawy) is the metropolitan area of Warsaw, the capital of Poland. The metropolitan area covers ten counties in the Masovian Voivodeship, with an area of 6,100 km^{2} (2,400 sq mi) and a population of around 3.5 million in 2022. The area constitutes a separate NUTS 2 unit, as well as a separate police region with a dedicated Capital Metropolitan Police Headquarters, both of them carved out from the Masovian Voivodeship as an exception, as Polish NUTS 2 areas and police regions are in general identical to the territories of voivodeships.

The largest cities or towns within the metropolitan area are Warsaw, Pruszków, Legionowo, Otwock, Mińsk Mazowiecki, Piaseczno and Wołomin.

Public transport in the metropolitan area is served by the Warsaw Public Transport Authority (Zarząd Transportu Miejskiego).

== Demographics ==
County	Area km^{2}	Population (2021)	Percentage of total population
Warsaw	517	1,930.520	58%
Wołomin	955	268,443	8%
Piaseczno	621	207,514	6%
Pruszków	246	176,623	5%
Mińsk Mazowiecki	1164	158,750	5%
Warsaw West	533	130,344	4%
Legionowo	390	127,617	4%
Otwock	615	126,694	4%
Grodzisk	367	102,011	3%
Nowy Dwór	692	79,925	2%
Warsaw metropolitan area	6100	3,305,100	100%

== Economy ==
In 2021 Warsaw's gross metropolitan product was €100 billion. This puts Warsaw in 20th place among cities in European Union.

== See also ==
- Metropolitan areas in Poland
