= Tarczyn =

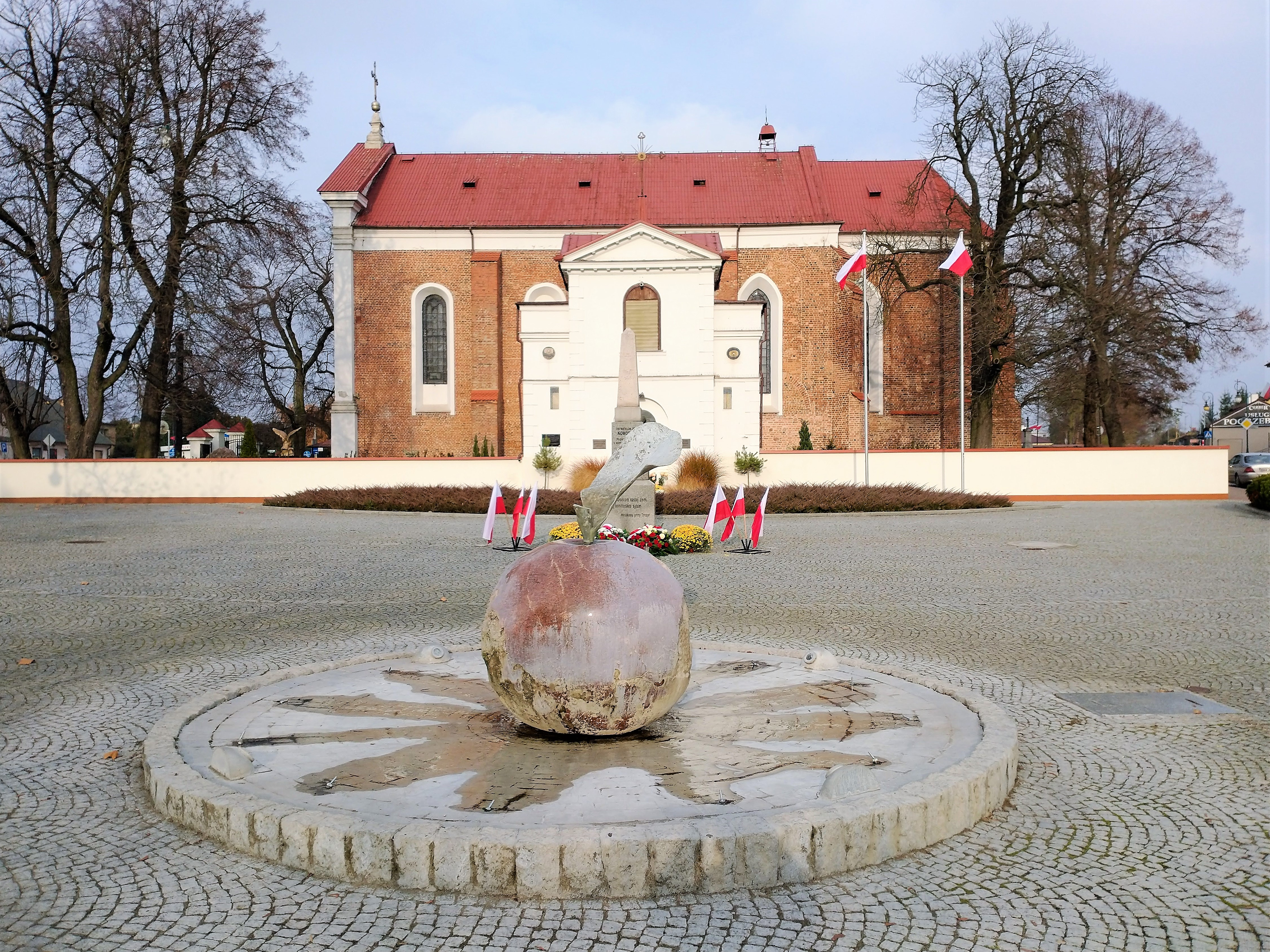
- Saint Nicholas church in Tarczyn

- Coat of arms

- Location within Poland
- Coordinates: 51°58′43″N 20°50′1″E
- Country: Poland
- Voivodeship: Masovian
- County: Piaseczno
- Gmina: Tarczyn
- Founded: 13th century
- Town rights: 1353

Government
  - Mayor: Dorota Lisicka

Area
  - Total: 5.24 km^{2} (2.02 sq mi)
- Elevation: 140 m (460 ft)

Population (2010)
  - Total: 3,919
  - Density: 748/km^{2} (1,940/sq mi)
- Time zone: UTC+1 (CET)
  - Summer (DST): UTC+2 (CEST)
- Postal code: 05-555
- Area code: +48 22
- Car plates: WPI
- Primary airport: Warsaw Chopin Airport
- Website: http://tarczyn.pl

Tarczyn [ˈtart͡ʂɨn] is a town in central Poland, seat of Gmina Tarczyn, in the Piaseczno County, in Masovian Voivodeship, about 30 kilometres (19 miles) south of Warsaw. There were 3,919 inhabitants living there in 2010. This town became famous for the eponymous juices that were made there.

== History ==
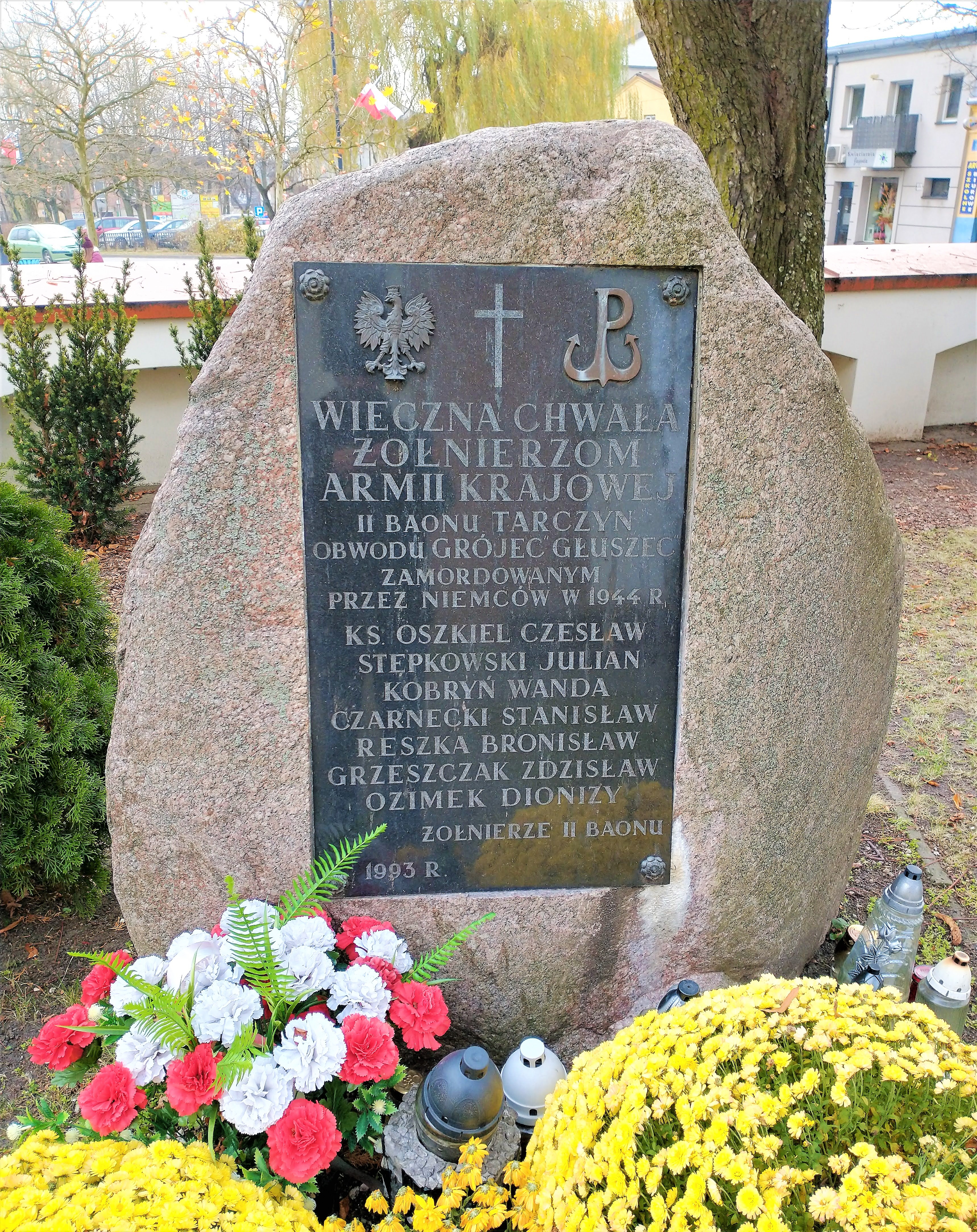
Memorial to local Polish resistance members murdered by the Germans in 1944

Tarczyn was founded as a market settlement in the 13th century. It was located at the intersection of the north-south Zakroczym-Warsaw-Radom and east-west Lublin-Łowicz-Poznań trade routes. It was established close to the banks of a small river, known today as Tarczynka, thereby deriving its name from this river. Early documented references to the locality include: "Tarczin" (1284), Tarczyno (1303), Tarczyn (1353, 1580), Tharczino (1355, 1241), Tarcynum (1634). Tarczyn was first mentioned in 1259. In 1353 the Mazovian Duke Casimir I gave the locality its Magdeburg town charter and financed the founding of Gothic St. Nicolas's church.

Tarczyn was administratively located in the Masovian Voivodeship in the Greater Poland Province until the Third Partition of Poland in 1795, when it was annexed by Prussia. In 1807 it was regained by Poles and included within the short-lived Polish Duchy of Warsaw, and after its dissolution, in 1815, it passed to newly formed Congress Poland within the Russian Partition of Poland. It was deprived of its town rights by the Tsarist administration following the unsuccessful Polish January Uprising of 1863–1864. Poland eventually regained independence after World War I in 1918, and Tarczyn was restored to Poland.

Historical population
Year	Pop.	±%
1890	2,212	—
1897	2,117	−4.3%
1910	3,078	+45.4%
1921	2,526	−17.9%
1960	1,810	−28.3%
2010	3,919	+116.5%

During the joint German-Soviet invasion of Poland, which started World War II in September 1939, the town was invaded and then occupied by Germany until 1945. Many Poles joined the underground resistance movement. Notable local resistance members included the pre-war school principal Julian Stępkowski, who organized secret Polish schooling during the occupation, priest Czesław Oszkiel, who issued birth certificates with changed names to people in need, Mieczysław Kaczyński, who distributed underground Polish press, and apothecary Ewa Jeżewska, who fed hungry people, treated wounded Polish soldiers and insurgents, and hid them from the Germans. Stępkowski, Oszkiel and Kaczyński were captured and murdered by the Germans in 1943–1944. In 1945 the German occupation ended and the town was restored to Poland, although with a Soviet-installed communist regime, which remained in power until the Fall of Communism in the 1980s. Ewa Jeżewska, who survived the war, was harassed by the communists and deprived of her pharmacy.

== Attractions ==
Tarczyn and its district have a few characteristic places like the forests and brushwoods, the picturesque tracts of woodlands, through which the river Jeziorka wends. Many tourist attractions: Tarczyn's 16th-century church; the wooden church in Rembertów; the rustic, little chapels in Leśna Polana, in Przypki and in Werdun; studs of horses; Organic Farm in Kawęczyn; tourist farm in Przypki; past verdant, thick forests to the western part of the district; the Manor House at Many, where Złotopolscy daytime soap opera was filmed (with English subtitles, viewable on satellite TV).

== Transport ==
Tarczyn is located west of the S7 highway, part of the international European route E77, connecting Kraków, Kielce and Radom in the south with Warsaw and Gdańsk in the north. The nearest major airport is the Warsaw Chopin Airport. Public transit is serviced by PKS Grójec which provides transit service to Warsaw West Station.

== Notable people ==
- Adam Franciszek Ksawery Rostkowski (1660–1738), Polish Catholic bishop, writer and translator; died in Tarczyn
- Irena Sendler (1910–2008), Polish war hero, humanitarian and nurse of the Polish resistance movement in World War II, head of the children's section of the Żegota, who rescued 2,500 Jewish children during the Holocaust, grew up in Tarczyn; honorary citizen of Tarczyn
- Jan Wróblewski, Polish brewer, founder of the Harbin Brewery, the oldest brewery in China
