= Prace =

Prace or Práče may refer to places:

== Czech Republic ==
- Prace, Czech Republic, a municipality and village in the South Moravian Region
- Práče, a municipality and village in the South Moravian Region

== Poland ==
- Prace, Poland, a village
- Prace Duże, a village
- Prace Małe, a village
