= Duki =

Duki may refer to:

== People ==
- Duki (rapper), Argentine rapper
- Duki Dror (born 1963), Israeli filmmaker

== Places ==
- Duki, Iran, a village in Zarabad District, Konarak County, Sistan and Baluchestan Province
- Duki, Poland, a village in Gmina Tarczyn, Piaseczno County, Masovian Voivodeship
- Duki District, Pakistan, a district in the Balochistan province of Pakistan
- Duki, another name for Dawki, a town in West Jaintia Hills district, Meghalaya, India

== See also ==
- Dookie, Victoria, a town in Australia
- Dukie Weems, a fictional character on the HBO drama The Wire, played by Jermaine Crawford
