= Piskórka =

- Village
- Location within Poland
- Coordinates: 51°59′N 21°0′E
- Country: Poland
- Voivodeship: Masovian
- County: Piaseczno
- Gmina: Prażmów

Piskórka [pisˈkurka] is a village in the administrative district of Gmina Prażmów, within Piaseczno County, Masovian Voivodeship, in east-central Poland. It lies approximately 6 km (4 mi) north-east of Prażmów, 10 km (6 mi) south of Piaseczno, and 26 km (16 mi) south of Warsaw.
