= Marianka, Piaseczno County =

Marianka
- Village
- Location within Poland
- Coordinates: 51°58′N 20°47′E
- Country: Poland
- Voivodeship: Masovian
- County: Piaseczno
- Gmina: Tarczyn

Marianka [maˈrjaŋka] is a village in the administrative district of Gmina Tarczyn, within Piaseczno County, Masovian Voivodeship, in east-central Poland.

== History ==
Marianka was originally a hamlet belonging to the nearby village of Drozdy. The settlement was recorded in the 19th-century Geographical Dictionary of the Kingdom of Poland, which described it as an outlying settlement associated with Drozdy, then located in Grójec County. According to a study of place names in Piaseczno County, the name Marianka derives from the Polish masculine given name Marian. The village also includes the locality of Duki.

== Demographics ==
According to the 2021 Polish census, Marianka had a population of 247, comprising 121 women and 126 men. Women accounted for approximately 49% of the population, while men represented 51%.
