= Biały Ług, Piaseczno County =

Biały Ług
- Village
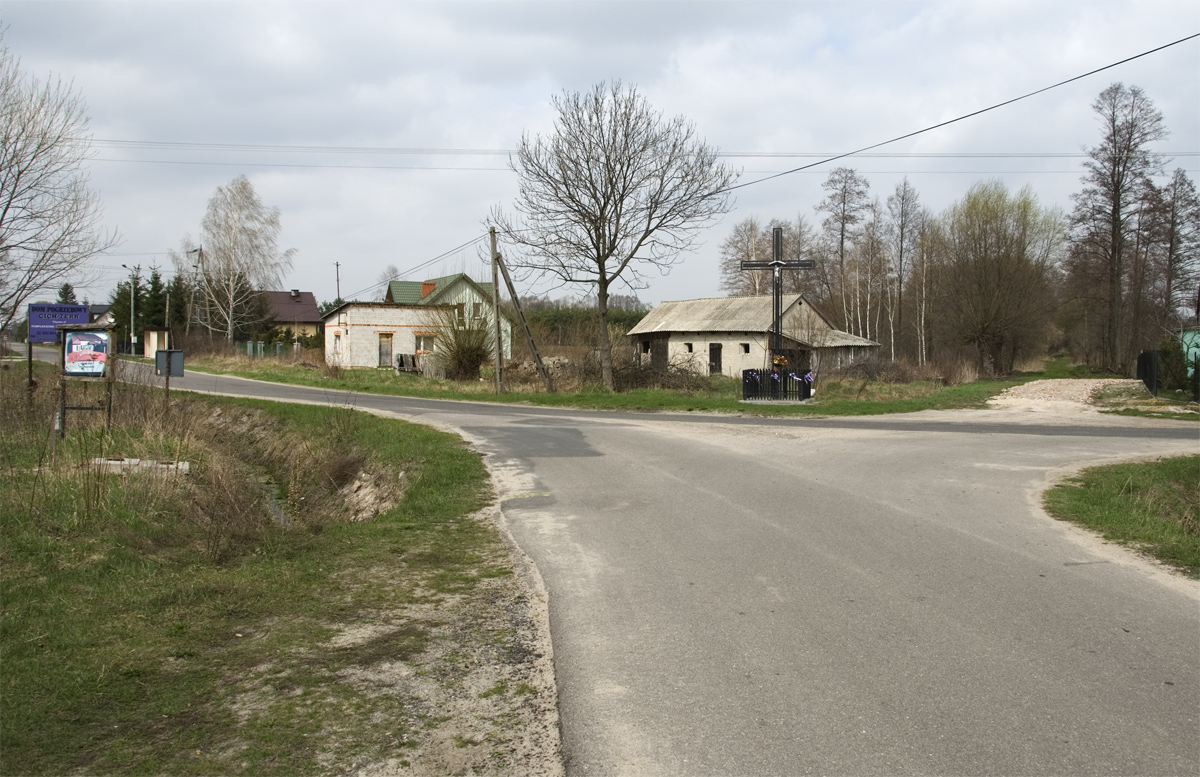
- Biały Ług Village, Prażmów Administrative District, Poland

- Location within Poland
- Coordinates: 51°56′55″N 21°03′00″E
- Country: Poland
- Voivodeship: Masovian
- County: Piaseczno
- Gmina: Prażmów

Biały Ług [ˈbjawɨ ˈwuk] is a village in the administrative district of Gmina Prażmów, within Piaseczno County, Masovian Voivodeship, in east-central Poland.
