= Koryta, Masovian Voivodeship =

Koryta
- Village
- Location within Poland
- Coordinates: 51°57′29″N 20°59′41″E
- Country: Poland
- Voivodeship: Masovian
- County: Piaseczno
- Gmina: Prażmów

Koryta (Polish pronunciation: [kɔˈrɨta]) is a village in the administrative district of Gmina Prażmów, within Piaseczno County, Masovian Voivodeship, in east-central Poland.
