= Drozdy =

Dorzdy may refer to:

- Drozdy, Masovian Voivodeship, Poland
- Drazdy, a microdistrict of Minsk, Belarus
- Győző Drozdy, a Hungarian teacher, journalist, and politician
