= Krępa, Piaseczno County =

Krępa
- Village
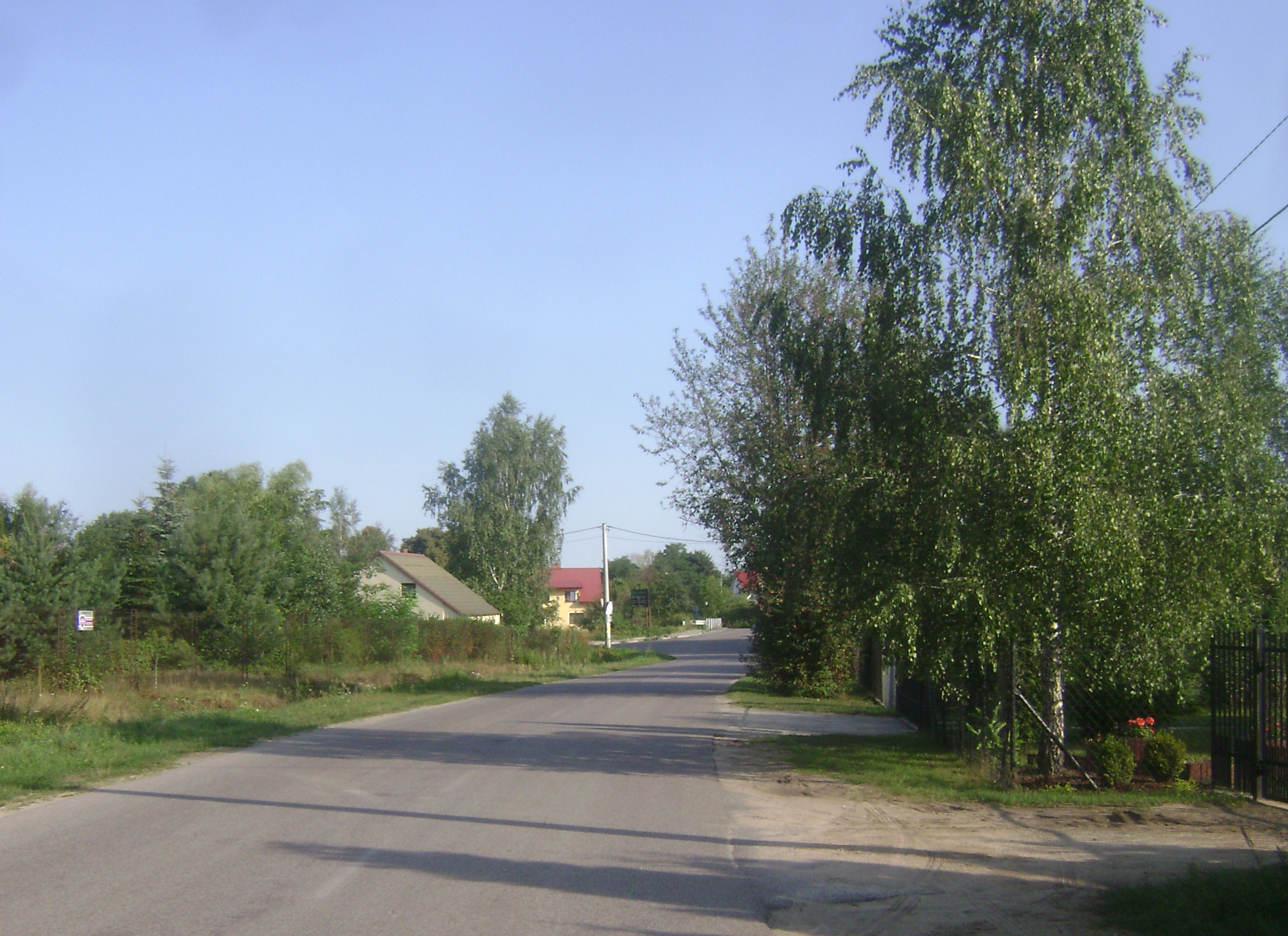

- Location within Poland
- Coordinates: 52°0′N 21°5′E
- Country: Poland
- Voivodeship: Masovian
- County: Piaseczno
- Gmina: Prażmów

Krępa [ˈkrɛmpa] is a village in the administrative district of Gmina Prażmów, within Piaseczno County, Masovian Voivodeship, in east-central Poland.
