= Ławki, Masovian Voivodeship =

Ławki
- Village
- Location within Poland
- Coordinates: 51°57′N 21°5′E
- Country: Poland
- Voivodeship: Masovian
- County: Piaseczno
- Gmina: Prażmów

Ławki [ˈwafki] is a village in the administrative district of Gmina Prażmów, within Piaseczno County, Masovian Voivodeship, in east-central Poland.
