= Lawstorant =

- Directed by: Mikołaj Haremski
- Story by: Tadeusz Porębski
- Produced by: Edward Gierwiałło
- Starring: Zbigniew Buczkowski; Michał Wiśniewski; Henryk Gołębiewski
- Cinematography: Zdzisław Najda
- Edited by: Jarosław Kamiński
- Music by: Jacek Łągwa
- Distributed by: ITI Film Studio
- Release date: 24 June 2005
- Running time: 104 minutes
- Country: Poland
- Language: Polish

Lawstorant is a 2005 Polish-language romantic comedy film, directed by Mikołaj Haremski.

== Fabule ==
The film takes place in Warsaw. Fragles (Michał Wiśniewski) is the film's protagonist, a gambler and trader who is compelled to make a significant sum of money. He enters into business with Lawstorant, who planning life interest (in the role played by Zbigniew Buczkowski). Lawstorant, dreams of a beautiful arrangement of life, fascinated by the director of the bank. Fragles with Lawstorant lead a company with goal to make a fortune. Their plans crosses the head of a local criminal group - Caruso (Slawomir Orzechowski), demanding a share in the profits, and second Lawstorant asked the bank for a loan in the amount of four million dollars. Terrified man faces a dilemma to risk their lives or be gangsters, and thus implicate his woman to prison, to which it is bound.

== Actors ==
- Zbigniew Buczkowski as Lawstorant
- Michał Wiśniewski as Fragles
- Jolanta Mrotek as Monika
- Jerzy Trela as Notary
- Sławomir Orzechowski as "Caruso"
- Ireneusz Czop as "Dags"
- Tomasz Sapryk as Kazio Traczyk
- Henryk Gołębiewski as Bawół
- Bohdan Gadomski as Lawstorant's neighbour
- Małgorzata Socha as Jola
- Małgorzata Pieczyńska as Joanna Burska
- Joanna Liszowska as Marta
- Bohdan Łazuka as Sylwek
- Paweł Koślik as policeman
- Sławomir Sulej as policeman
- Sebastian Domagała as Lutek
