= Popielarze =

Popielarze may refer to the following places:

- Popielarze, Gniezno County in Greater Poland Voivodeship (west-central Poland)
- Popielarze, Piaseczno County in Masovian Voivodeship (east-central Poland)
- Popielarze, Wołomin County in Masovian Voivodeship (east-central Poland)
- Popielarze, Turek County in Greater Poland Voivodeship (west-central Poland)
