= Dobrzenica =

- Village
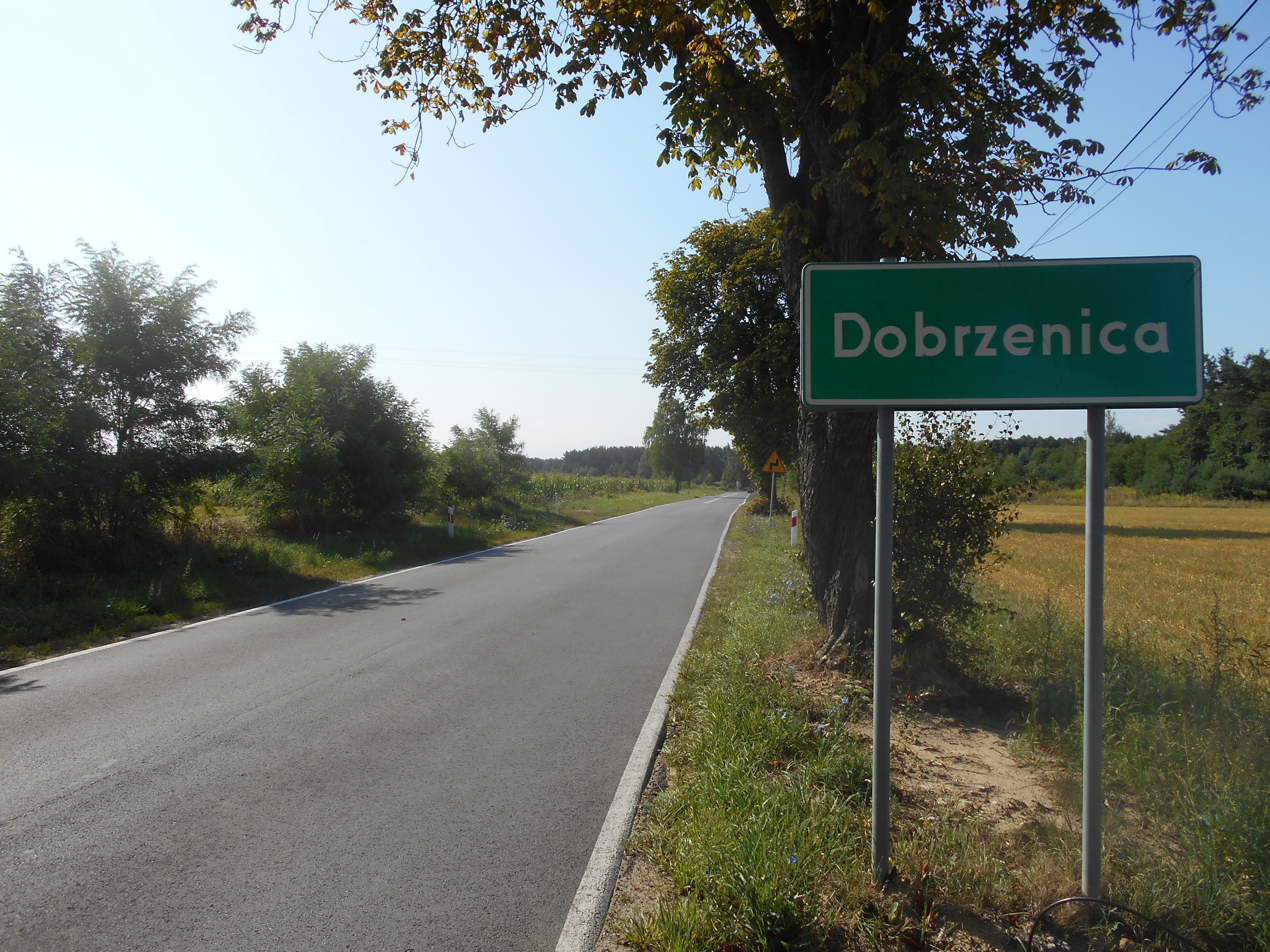

- Location within Poland
- Coordinates: 51°56′N 20°59′E
- Country: Poland
- Voivodeship: Masovian
- County: Piaseczno
- Gmina: Prażmów
- Time zone: UTC+1 (CET)
  - Summer (DST): UTC+2 (CEST)

Dobrzenica [dɔbʐɛˈnit͡sa] is a village in the administrative district of Gmina Prażmów, within Piaseczno County, Masovian Voivodeship, in east-central Poland.

Six Polish citizens were murdered by Nazi Germany in the village during World War II.
