= Kamionka, Gmina Prażmów =

Kamionka
- Village
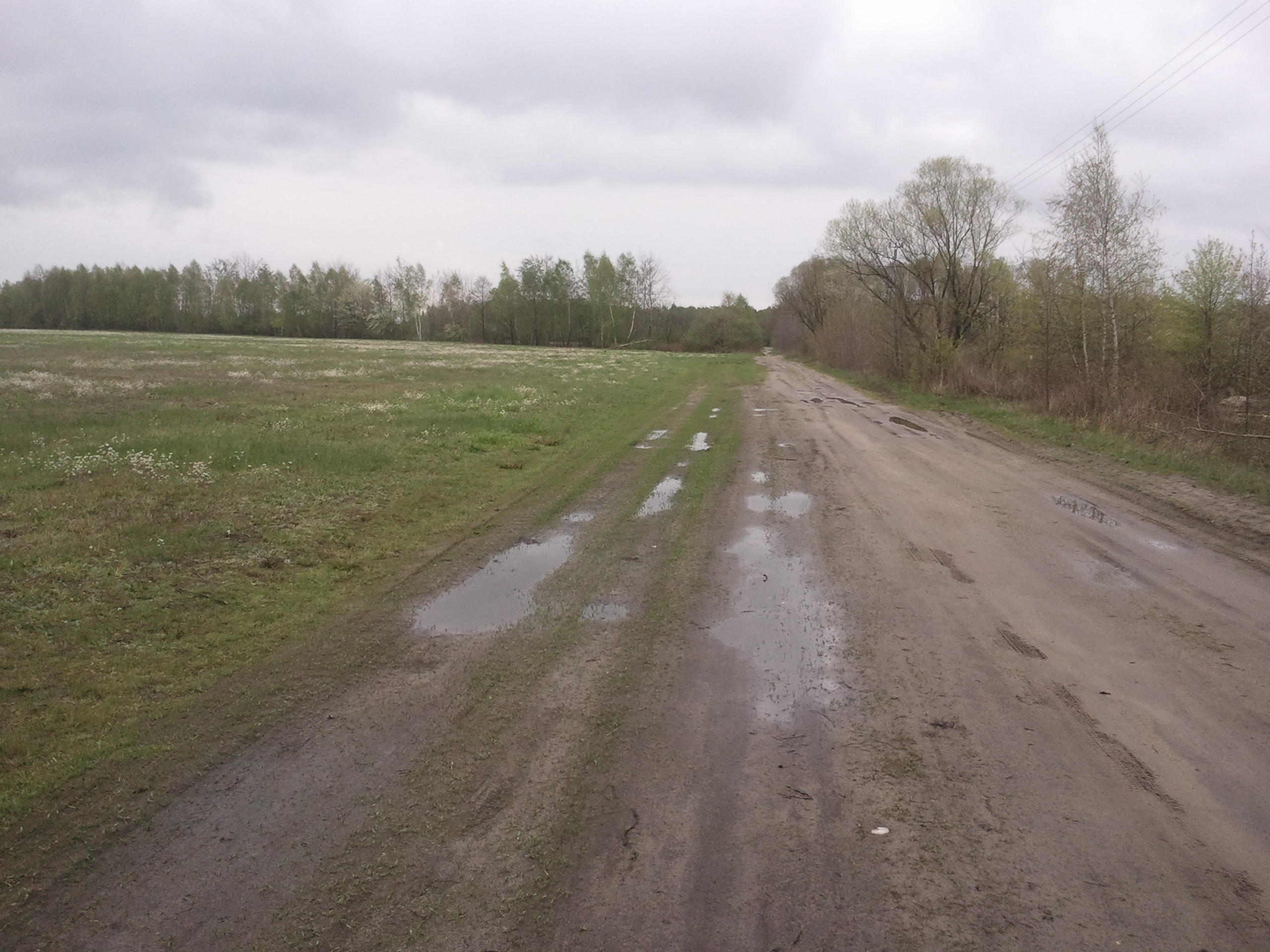
- A road in Kamionka, Prażmów

- Location within Poland
- Coordinates: 51°57′49.24″N 21°1′10.55″E
- Country: Poland
- Voivodeship: Masovian
- County: Piaseczno
- Gmina: Prażmów
- Population: 60

Kamionka [kaˈmjɔnka] is a village in the administrative district of Gmina Prażmów, within Piaseczno County, Masovian Voivodeship, in east-central Poland.
