= Stara Kopana =

- Village
- Location within Poland
- Coordinates: 51°56′44″N 20°51′05″E
- Country: Poland
- Voivodeship: Masovian
- County: Piaseczno
- Gmina: Tarczyn

Stara Kopana [ˈstara kɔˈpana] is a village in the administrative district of Gmina Tarczyn, within Piaseczno County, Masovian Voivodeship, in east-central Poland.
