= Skrzeczeniec =

- Village
- Location within Poland
- Coordinates: 51°56′33″N 20°51′27″E
- Country: Poland
- Voivodeship: Masovian
- County: Piaseczno
- Gmina: Tarczyn

Skrzeczeniec [skʂɛˈt͡ʂɛɲɛt͡s] is a village in the administrative district of Gmina Tarczyn, within Piaseczno County, Masovian Voivodeship, in east-central Poland.
