= Jaroszowa Wola =

- Village
- Location within Poland
- Coordinates: 51°59′N 21°2′E
- Country: Poland
- Voivodeship: Masovian
- County: Piaseczno
- Gmina: Prażmów

Jaroszowa Wola [jarɔˈʂɔva ˈvɔla] is a village in the administrative district of Gmina Prażmów, in Piaseczno County, Masovian Voivodeship, in east-central Poland.
