= Kędzierówka =

- Village
- Location within Poland
- Coordinates: 51°58′51″N 21°03′15″E
- Country: Poland
- Voivodeship: Masovian
- County: Piaseczno
- Gmina: Prażmów

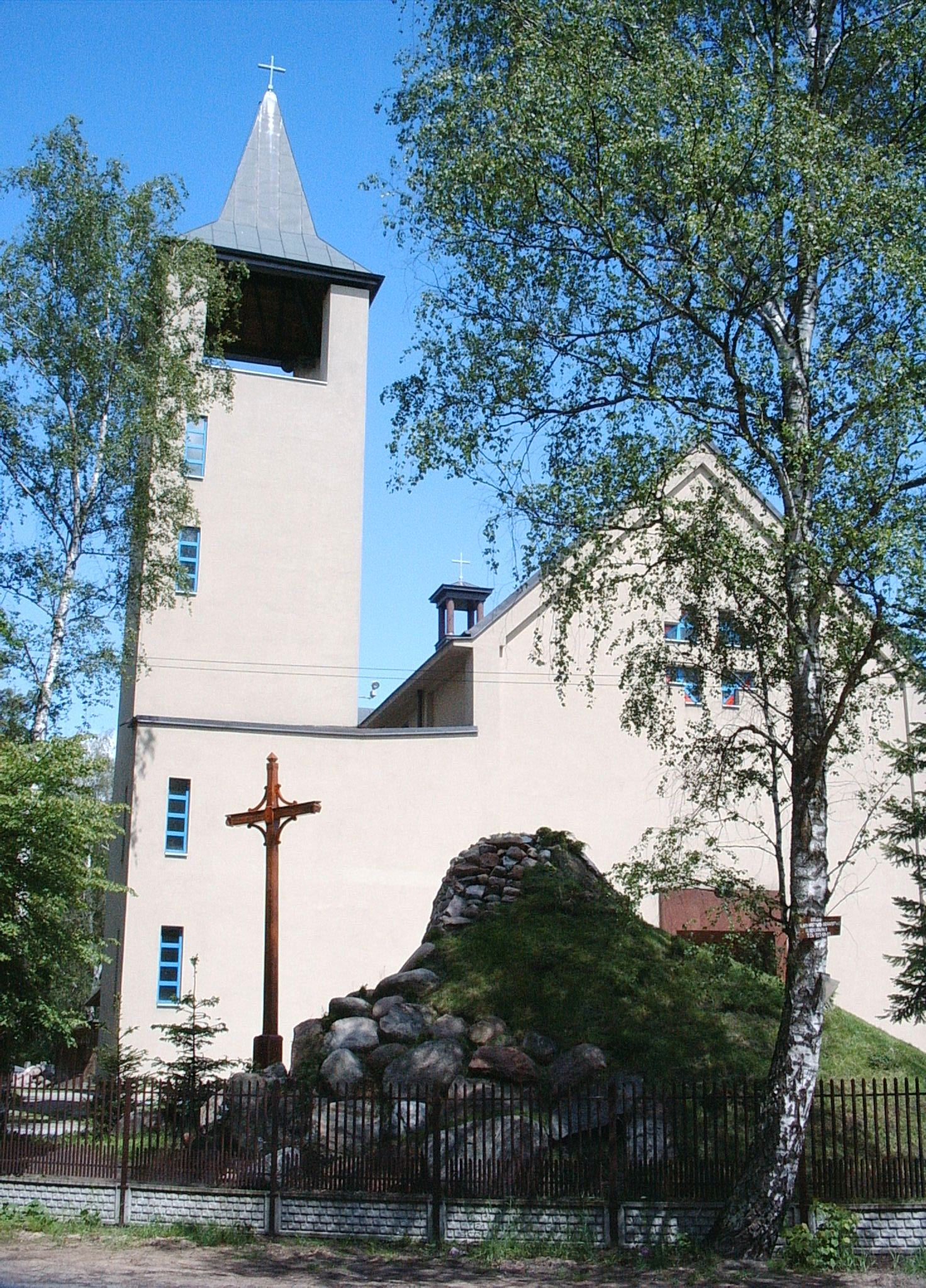
A church in Kędzierówka.

Kędzierówka [kɛnd͡ʑɛˈrufka] is a village in the administrative district of Gmina Prażmów, within Piaseczno County, Masovian Voivodeship, in east-central Poland.
