= Nowe Wągrodno =

- Village
- Location within Poland
- Coordinates: 51°56′47″N 21°02′09″E
- Country: Poland
- Voivodeship: Masovian
- County: Piaseczno
- Gmina: Prażmów

Nowe Wągrodno [ˈnɔvɛ vɔŋˈɡrɔdnɔ] is a village in the administrative district of Gmina Prażmów, within Piaseczno County, Masovian Voivodeship, in east-central Poland.
