= Gabryelin =

- Village
- Location within Poland
- Coordinates: 51°58′N 21°4′E
- Country: Poland
- Voivodeship: Masovian
- County: Piaseczno
- Gmina: Prażmów
- Population: 820
- Website: GABRYELIN.VEL.PL

Gabryelin [ɡaˈbrʲjɛlʲĩn] is a village in the administrative district of Gmina Prażmów, within Piaseczno County, Masovian Voivodeship, in east-central Poland.
