= Wilcza Wólka, Masovian Voivodeship =

Wilcza Wólka
- Village
- Location within Poland
- Coordinates: 51°57′N 20°57′E
- Country: Poland
- Voivodeship: Masovian
- County: Piaseczno
- Gmina: Prażmów

Wilcza Wólka [ˈvilt͡ʂa ˈvulka] is a village in the administrative district of Gmina Prażmów, within Piaseczno County, Masovian Voivodeship, in east-central Poland.
