= Wola Prażmowska =

- Village
- Location within Poland
- Coordinates: 51°56′44″N 20°59′17″E
- Country: Poland
- Voivodeship: Masovian
- County: Piaseczno
- Gmina: Prażmów
- Population: 320

Wola Prażmowska [ˈvɔla praʐˈmɔfska] is a village in the administrative district of Gmina Prażmów, within Piaseczno County, Masovian Voivodeship, in east-central Poland.
