= Jeziorzany =

Jeziorzany may refer to the following places:

- Jeziorzany, Lesser Poland Voivodeship (south Poland)
- Jeziorzany, Lublin Voivodeship (east Poland)
- Jeziorzany, Masovian Voivodeship (east-central Poland)
