= Wągrodno, Piaseczno County =

Wągrodno
- Village
- Location within Poland
- Coordinates: 51°57′N 21°1′E
- Country: Poland
- Voivodeship: Masovian
- County: Piaseczno
- Gmina: Prażmów
- Population: 150

Wągrodno [vɔŋˈɡrɔdnɔ] is a village in the administrative district of Gmina Prażmów, within Piaseczno County, Masovian Voivodeship, in east-central Poland.
