= Wólka Jeżewska =

- Village
- Location within Poland
- Coordinates: 51°56′N 20°42′E
- Country: Poland
- Voivodeship: Masovian
- County: Piaseczno
- Gmina: Tarczyn

Wólka Jeżewska [ˈvulka jɛˈʐɛfska] is a village in the administrative district of Gmina Tarczyn, within Piaseczno County, Masovian Voivodeship, in east-central Poland.
