= Chosna =

- Village
- Location within Poland
- Coordinates: 51°56′N 21°2′E
- Country: Poland
- Voivodeship: Masovian
- County: Piaseczno
- Gmina: Prażmów

Chosna [ˈxɔsna] is a village with about 372 people, in the administrative district of Gmina Prażmów, within Piaseczno County, Masovian Voivodeship, in east-central Poland.
