= Kolonia Jeziorzany =

- Village
- Location within Poland
- Coordinates: 51°57′N 20°50′E
- Country: Poland
- Voivodeship: Masovian
- County: Piaseczno
- Gmina: Tarczyn

Kolonia Jeziorzany [kɔˈlɔɲa jɛʑɔˈʐanɨ] is a village in the administrative district of Gmina Tarczyn, within Piaseczno County, Masovian Voivodeship, in east-central Poland.
