= Wola Wągrodzka =

- Village
- Location within Poland
- Coordinates: 51°56′44″N 21°0′57″E
- Country: Poland
- Voivodeship: Masovian
- County: Piaseczno
- Gmina: Prażmów

Wola Wągrodzka [ˈvɔla vɔŋˈɡrɔt͡ska] is a village in the administrative district of Gmina Prażmów, within Piaseczno County, Masovian Voivodeship, in east-central Poland.
