= Kolonia Gościeńczyce =

- Village
- Location within Poland
- Coordinates: 51°54′43″N 20°57′57″E
- Country: Poland
- Voivodeship: Masovian
- County: Piaseczno
- Gmina: Prażmów

Kolonia Gościeńczyce (Polish pronunciation: [kɔˈlɔɲa ɡɔɕt͡ɕɛj̃ˈt͡ʂɨt͡sɛ]) is a village in the administrative district of Gmina Prażmów, within Piaseczno County, Masovian Voivodeship, in east-central Poland.
