= Pawłowice, Piaseczno County =

Pawłowice
- Village
- Location within Poland
- Coordinates: 51°56′38″N 20°52′43″E
- Country: Poland
- Voivodeship: Masovian
- County: Piaseczno
- Gmina: Tarczyn

Pawłowice [pavwɔˈvit͡sɛ] is a village in the administrative district of Gmina Tarczyn, within Piaseczno County, Masovian Voivodeship, in east-central Poland.
