= Księżowola =

- Settlement
- Location within Poland
- Coordinates: 51°56′N 20°50′E
- Country: Poland
- Voivodeship: Masovian
- County: Piaseczno
- Gmina: Tarczyn
- Population: 140

Księżowola [kɕɛ̃ʐɔˈvɔla] is a settlement in the administrative district of Gmina Tarczyn, within Piaseczno County, Masovian Voivodeship, in east-central Poland.
