= Suchodół, Piaseczno County =

Suchodół
- Village
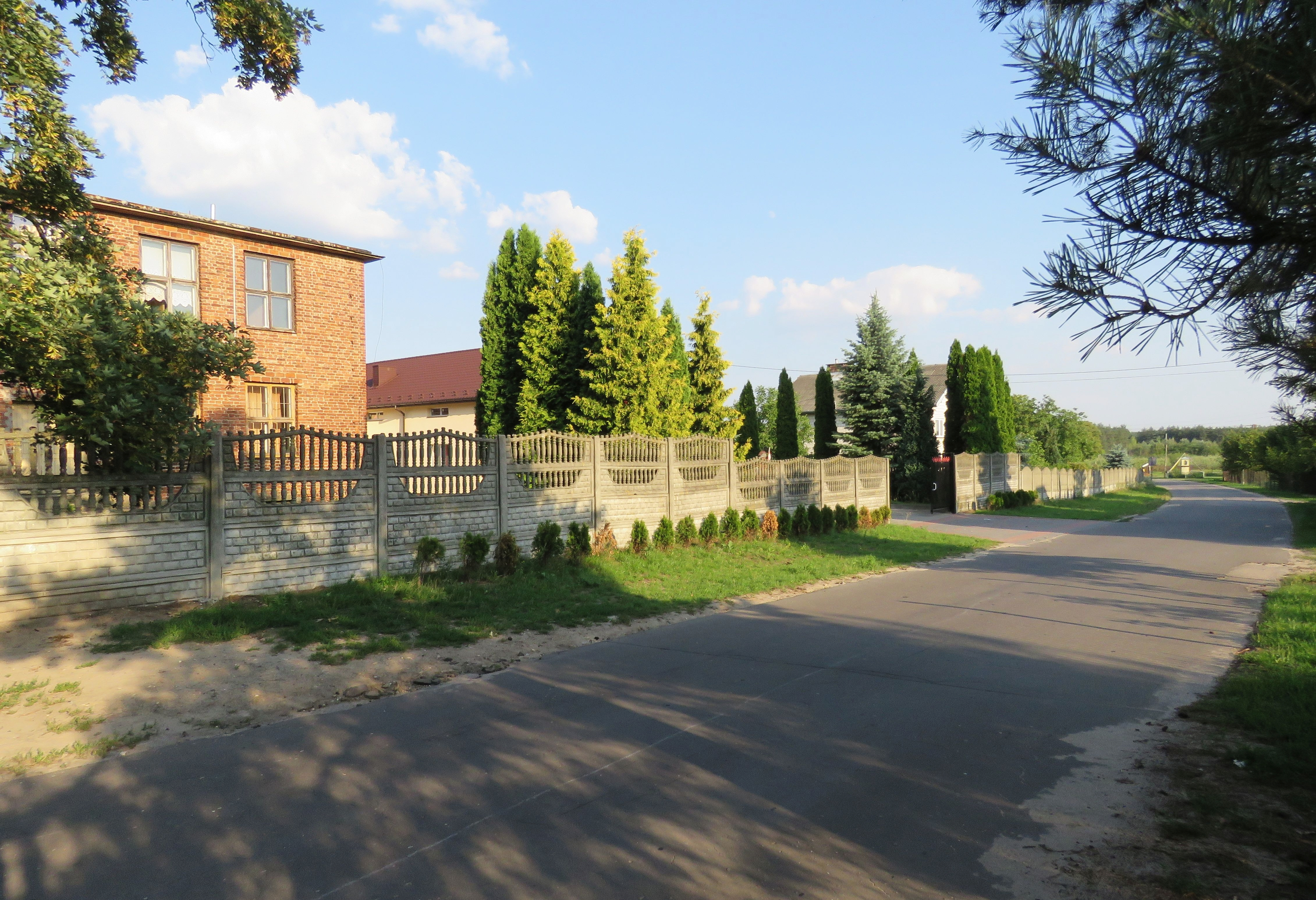

- Location within Poland
- Coordinates: 51°58′N 20°46′E
- Country: Poland
- Voivodeship: Masovian
- County: Piaseczno
- Gmina: Tarczyn
- Time zone: UTC+1 (CET)
  - Summer (DST): UTC+2 (CEST)

Suchodół (Polish pronunciation: [suˈxɔduw]) is a village in the administrative district of Gmina Tarczyn, within Piaseczno County, Masovian Voivodeship, in east-central Poland.

Six Polish citizens were murdered by Nazi Germany in the village during World War II.
