= Uwieliny =

- Village
- Location within Poland
- Coordinates: 51°59′N 21°3′E
- Country: Poland
- Voivodeship: Masovian
- County: Piaseczno
- Gmina: Prażmów

Uwieliny [uvjɛˈlinɨ] is a village in the administrative district of Gmina Prażmów, within Piaseczno County, Masovian Voivodeship, in east-central Poland.
