= Grzędy =

Grzędy may refer to the following places in Poland:

- Grzędy, Lower Silesian Voivodeship (south-west Poland)
- Grzędy, Podlaskie Voivodeship (north-east Poland)
- Grzędy, Masovian Voivodeship (east-central Poland)
