= Błonie, Piaseczno County =

Błonie
- Village
- Location within Poland
- Coordinates: 51°55′46″N 20°58′53″E
- Country: Poland
- Voivodeship: Masovian
- County: Piaseczno
- Gmina: Prażmów
- Population: 50

Błonie [ˈbwɔɲɛ] is a village in the administrative district of Gmina Prażmów, within Piaseczno County, Masovian Voivodeship, in east-central Poland.
