= Zadębie, Piaseczno County =

Zadębie
- Village
- Location within Poland
- Coordinates: 51°55′58″N 21°00′54″E
- Country: Poland
- Voivodeship: Masovian
- County: Piaseczno
- Gmina: Prażmów
- Population: 110

Zadębie [zaˈdɛmbjɛ] is a village in the administrative district of Gmina Prażmów, within Piaseczno County, Masovian Voivodeship, in east-central Poland.
