= Nowy Prażmów =

- Village
- Location within Poland
- Coordinates: 51°58′03″N 20°57′40″E
- Country: Poland
- Voivodeship: Masovian
- County: Piaseczno
- Gmina: Prażmów

Nowy Prażmów [ˈnɔvɨ ˈpraʐmuf] is a village in the administrative district of Gmina Prażmów, within Piaseczno County, Masovian Voivodeship, in east-central Poland.
