= Wola Przypkowska-Kolonia =

- Village
- Location within Poland
- Coordinates: 52°00′31″N 20°49′58″E
- Country: Poland
- Voivodeship: Masovian
- County: Piaseczno
- Gmina: Tarczyn

Wola Przypkowska-Kolonia [ˈvɔla pʂɨpˈkɔfska kɔˈlɔɲa] is a village in the administrative district of Gmina Tarczyn, within Piaseczno County, Masovian Voivodeship, in east-central Poland.
