= Ustanów =

Village in Poland

- Village
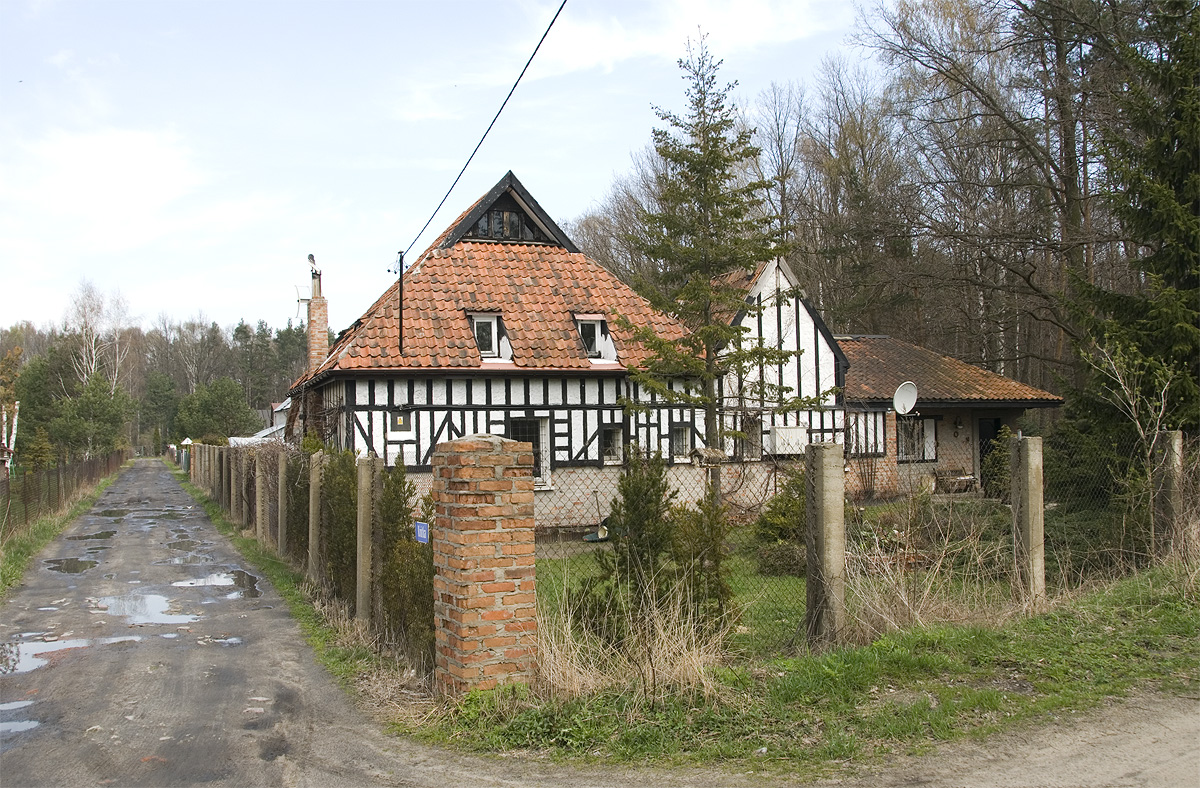

- Location within Poland
- Coordinates: 52°0′N 21°4′E
- Country: Poland
- Voivodeship: Masovian
- County: Piaseczno
- Gmina: Prażmów
- Population: 2,100
- Website: ustanow.pl

Ustanów [usˈtanuf] is a village in the administrative district of Gmina Prażmów, within Piaseczno County, Masovian Voivodeship, in east-central Poland.
