= Edward Gierwiałło =

Polish businessman, film producer

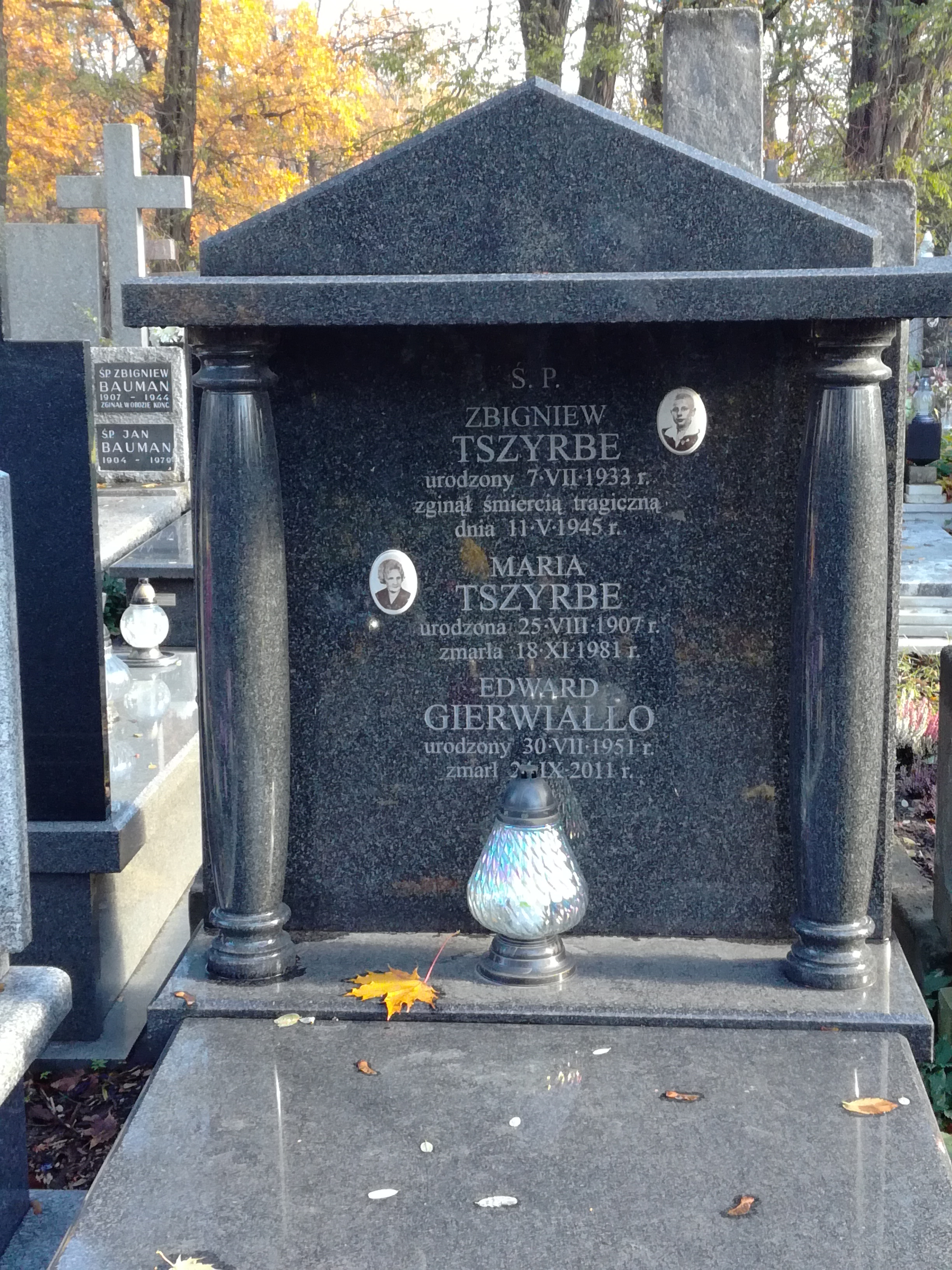
Edward Gierwiałło's grave at the Bródno Cemetery

Edward Gierwiałło (30 July 1951 – 24 September 2011) was a Polish entrepreneur, film producer, and co-founder of the real estate development company Edbud in 1992. In 2004, he produced the crime comedy Lawstorant, which premiered in 2005.

== Personal life ==
He lived in Świętochów. He was married to the writer and poet Lidia Gierwiałło. He had two sons: Michał and Mateusz and two daughters: Marta and Aleksandra.

== Death and tributes ==
He died on 24 September 2021, aged 60. The funeral ceremonies began on 30 September 2011 with a Mass at the Church of St. Padre Pio in Warsaw. Subsequently, Gierwiałło was buried at the Bródno Cemetery in Warsaw (section 25C-6-13).

On July 9, 2012, he was posthumously awarded the title of Honorary Citizen of the City of Tarczyn for "activities for the development of the local community, supporting the Tarczyn commune through his skillful, constructive activities, contributing to the improvement of its image, and above all, for great concern for the good of his Little Homeland".
