= Święta wojna =

Polish comedy, sitcom in Silesian language

- Genre: Comedy
- Created by: Marek Bielecki
- Directed by: Marek Bielecki; Dariusz Goczał
- Starring: Zbigniew Buczkowski; Krzysztof Hanke; Joanna Bartel; Józef Polok; Gertruda Szalsza; Bogdan Kalus
- Opening theme: Jarosław Barów
- Country of origin: Poland
- Original language: Polish
- No. of seasons: 10
- No. of episodes: 322

Production
- Running time: 25 minutes
- Production company: Agencja Telewizyjna ZOOM

Original release
- Network: TVP2
- Release: January 23, 2000 – 2009

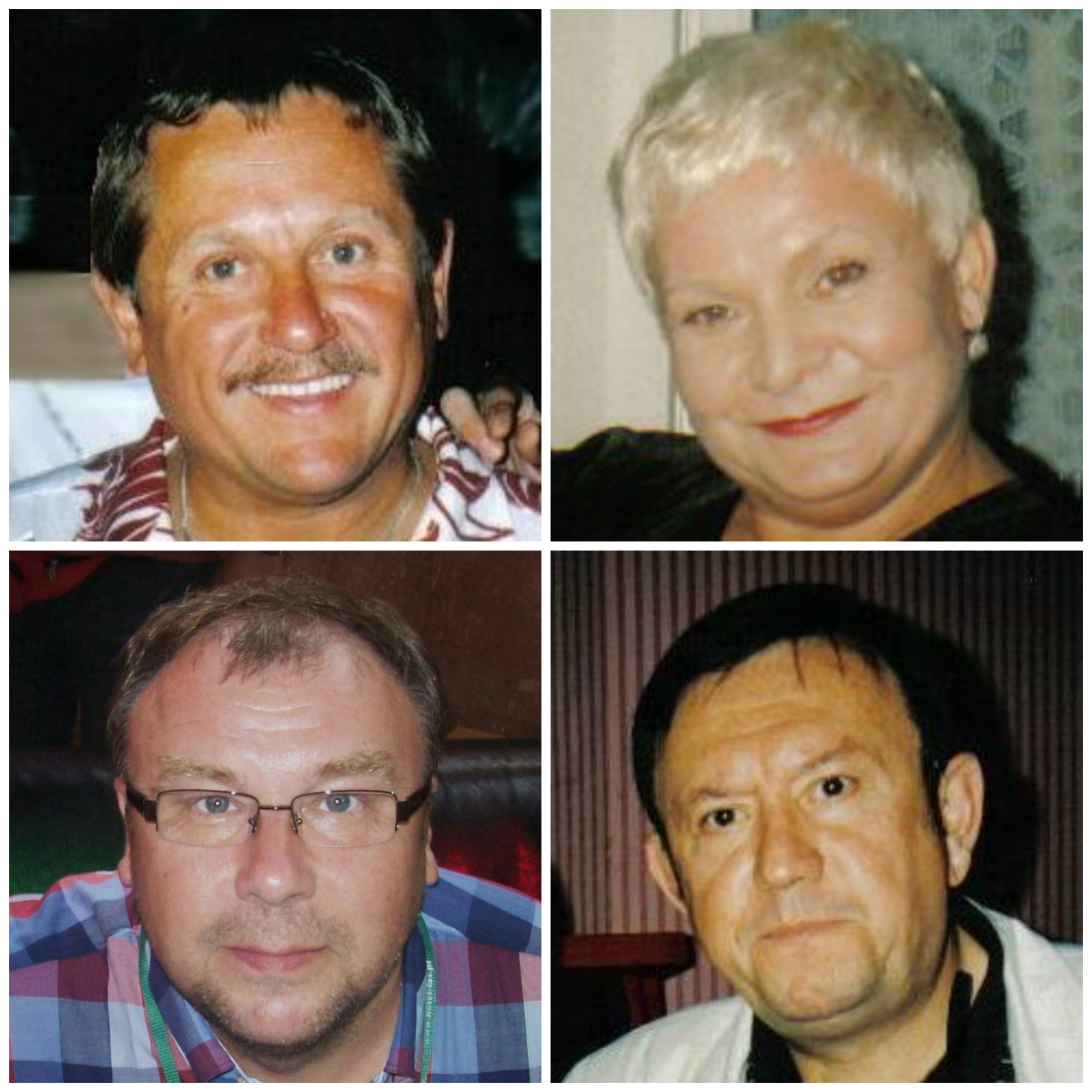
The main cast of the Polish series "Holy War" Clockwise from the top left: Bercik, Andzia, Zbyszek, Gerard

Święta wojna (eng. Holy War) is a popular Polish comedy series broadcast on TVP2 from January 23, 2000 to May 9, 2009. The series runs in Katowice. In this series characters communicate using a mix of Silesian and Polish language to show culture whilst remaining intelligible for the Polish speaking audience.

== Plot ==
A retired miner Bercik lives with his wife Andzia in Katowice. Every week they host a Varsovian named Zbyszek, who is Bercik's friend. Bercik comes up with various get-rich-quick schemes, to which he usually involves Zbyszek. However, their plans usually end in failure.

== Cast and characters ==
=== Main characters ===
- Krzysztof Hanke as Hubert "Bercik" Dworniok: the central character of the show, a short-statured, gullible, mythomaniac, and mentally unstable ex-miner from Silesia. Bercik is a Silesian traditionalist and local xenophobe who passionately hates anything related to "gorols" (non-Silesians), specifically to those from Warsaw or the nearby Sosnowiec. He lives in a tenement house at Korfanty Street 13/6. As a reservist, he holds the rank of private first-class. Being a pensioner since the closure of the mine he worked at, Bercik tries to quickly earn some money, usually through various ridiculous ideas, which always end up badly for him, many a time because of his lack of knowledge or skill in the matter. As a racist, Bercik accuses Andzia of committing adultery with black men, with whom he is obsessed. On the other hand, he is an erotomaniac himself, who constantly chases young and beautiful women despite being married. His favorite activities are daydreaming on a couch and regular visits to Alojz's bar to drink beer. Due to his compulsive and obsessive behavior, he is regarded as a madman by people from his surroundings, even being named "Silesia's biggest psycho". Despite his disadvantages, his intentions are usually good. Bercik is the only character to appear in every episode.
- Zbigniew Buczkowski as Zbigniew "Zbyszek" Pyciakowski: Bercik's best friend and former brother-in-arms. A salesman from Warsaw doing business in Silesia, he visits Bercik every week, staying at his place. Due to his friend's anti-Warsaw approach, they sometimes clash, but quickly reconcile. Zbyszek is well-read and wordly person, but despite being the smarter of the two, he usually joins Bercik in his schemes. He is not married, but has an illegitimate son of whom he had no idea up to the final episode. He actually resides in Pruszków, but originates from Czerniaków. As a reservist, he holds the rank of private first-class.
- Joanna Bartel as Anna "Andzia" Dworniok, nee Kowolik: Bercik's stout, demanding and resolute wife. She used to work in Cologne, where she comes back from time to time. Despite boundlessly loving her husband, whom she calls "Silesian tamagotchi", Andzia is usually against his crazy ideas and his visits to Alojz' bar. She gets along very well with Zbyszek and her neighbor Karlikowa.

=== Secondary characters ===
- Gertruda Szalsza as Mrs. Karlikowa: Bercik and Andzia's elderly neighbor, who often visits them. She does not like Bercik and considers him crazy but thinks otherwise of Andzia and Zbyszek, despite finding the latter the primary reason of Bercik's madness.
- Bogdan Kalus as Gerard Nowok: Bercik's neighbor and buddy. A shady, alcoholic conman and master of devious logic, Gerard often takes advantage of his neighbor's naivety, making him his victim. He is addicted to beer and usually borrows five zlotys to buy a pint at Alojz' pub. His scams got him thrown in jail several times during the series' course. As a reservist, he holds the rank of corporal.
- Krzysztof Respondek as Ewald: Bercik's neighbor, a musician and cook who works at a local community center and theater.
- Józef Polok as Ernest Kowolik: Andzia's brother, an accomplished businessman, who mutually dislikes his brother-in-law. His wealth makes Bercik jealous, who frequently calls him miser and scoundrel, despite Ernest often lending him money or reluctantly employing him. He starts various businesses, sometimes shady ones, many of which are destroyed by Bercik. Ultimately, Bercik's craziness leads Ernest to stay in a mental ward and then to move to Tibet, where he donated almost all of his assets to Johnny.
- Marek Bielecki as Darek: a Varsovian who for a few weeks, rented a room at Bercik's during Andzia and Zbyszek's stay in Cologne. Just like Zbyszek, he is a salesman who comes to Katowice to do business. He was last seen in episode 14.
- Grzegorz Stasiak as Alojz: Bercik's sarcastic friend and the owner and keeper of his favorite pub. He sometimes collaborates with Ernest, who helps him financially.
- Andrzej Mrozek as Kipuś: a portly friend of Bercik and a regular customer of Alojz, who usually buys beer on credit. He used to be a miner, dancing instructor and butcher and is known to have a wife.
- Paweł Polok as Johnny: a local postman traumatized by Bercik who always greets him with a blank-pointed unloaded rifle. Eventually, he quits his job and becomes a businessman after Ernest gives him all of his wealth. He is later revealed to be a distant cousin of Andzia and Ernest.
- Jan Jakub Skupiński as Hubert "Hubercik" Stańczyk: a teenage son of Bercik's cousin from Sosnowiec, who used to live with him for some time when his parents went to work in Brussels. He finds his uncle's antics crazy, as Bercik tries to make his nephew "real" Silesian.
