= Rembertów, Masovian Voivodeship =

Rembertów
- Village
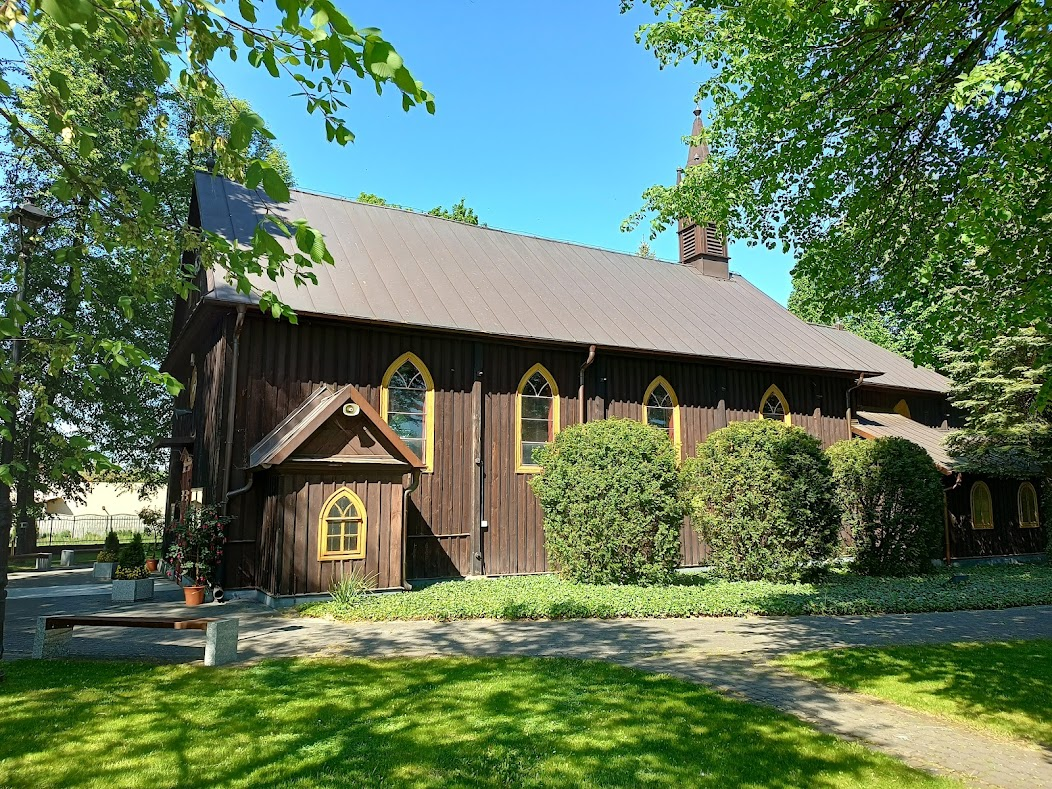
- Saint John the Baptist church in Rembertów

- Location within Poland
- Coordinates: 51°57′N 20°49′E
- Country: Poland
- Voivodeship: Masovian
- County: Piaseczno
- Gmina: Tarczyn
- Time zone: UTC+1 (CET)
  - Summer (DST): UTC+2 (CEST)
- Postal code: 05-555
- Vehicle registration: WPI

Rembertów [rɛmˈbɛrtuf] is a village in the administrative district of Gmina Tarczyn, within Piaseczno County, Masovian Voivodeship, in east-central Poland.

== History ==
In the early modern period, a trade route connecting Warsaw and Kraków ran through the village. It was one of the busiest routes in Poland.
