= Janusz Kondratiuk =

Polish film director and writer (1943–2019)

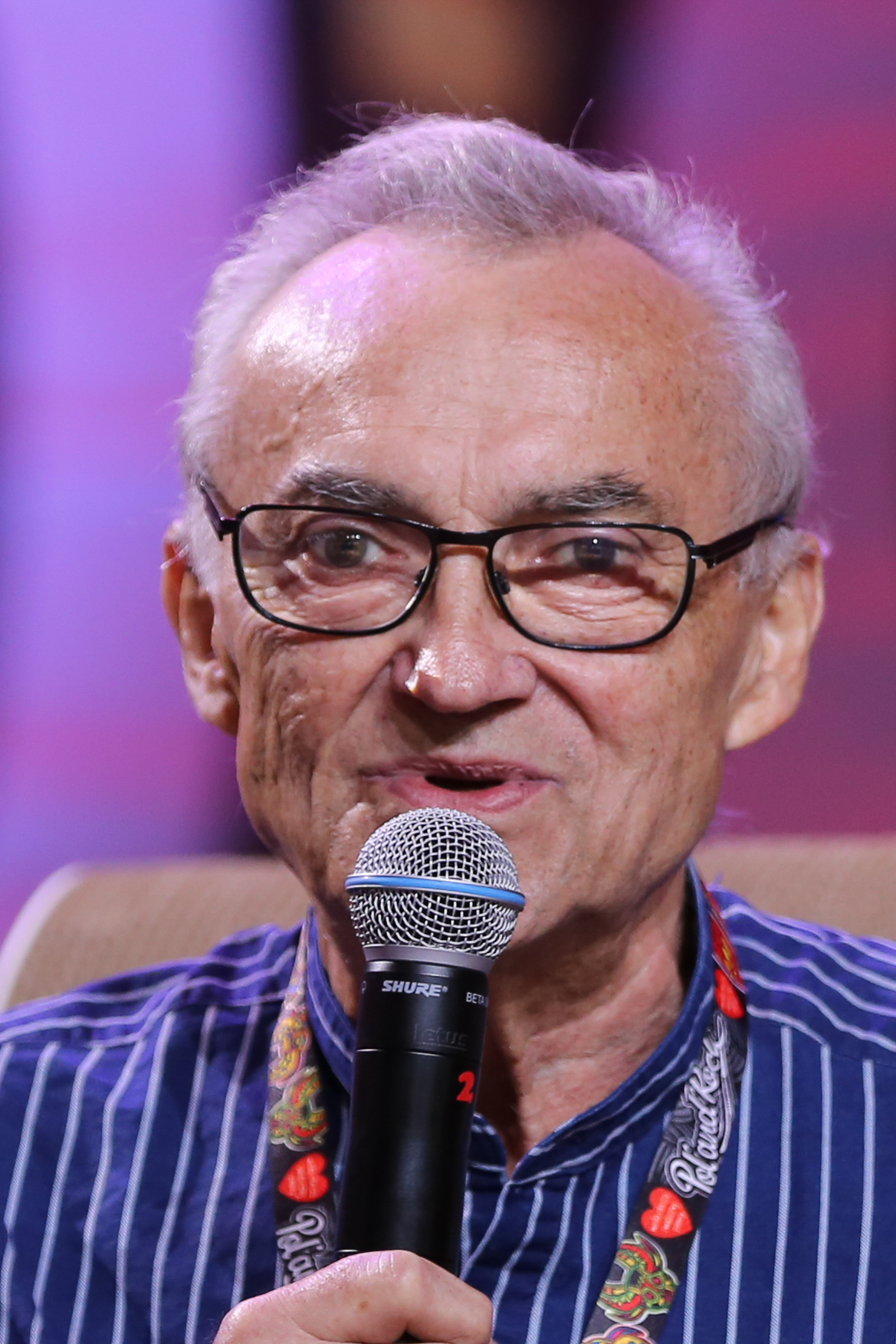
Janusz Kondratiuk in 2018

Janusz Kondratiuk (29 September 1943 – 7 October 2019) was a Polish director and writer. He was born in Kazakhstan. He died in Łoś, aged 76.

== Filmography as director ==
- 1964 – Wielki dzień; etiuda szkolna
- 1964 – Deszczowy spacer; etiuda szkolna
- 1965 – Szczęśliwy koniec; etiuda szkolna
- 1966 – Nie mówmy o tym więcej; etiuda szkolna
- 1967 – Gwiazdy w oczach; etiuda szkolna
- 1969 – Jak zdobyć pieniądze, kobietę i sławę
- 1971 – Niedziela Barabasza
- 1972 – Dziewczyny do wzięcia
- 1973 – Wniebowzięci
- 1973 – Pies
- 1975 – Mała sprawa
- 1976 – Czy jest tu panna na wydaniu?
- 1980 – Carmilla
- 1982 – Klakier
- 1987 – Jedenaste przykazanie
- 1988 – Prywatne niebo
- 1991 – Głos
- 1996 – Złote runo
- 2000 – Noc świętego Mikołaja
- 2006 – Faceci do wzięcia
- 2010 – Milion dolarów
- 2018 – Jak pies z kotem
