= Adam Franciszek Ksawery Rostkowski =

Polish Roman Catholic prelate and writer

Most Reverend Adam Franciszek Ksawery Rostkowski
- Auxiliary Bishop of Lutsk; Titular Bishop of Philadelphia in Arabia
- Church: Catholic Church
- Diocese: Diocese of Lutsk
- In office: 1700–1738

Orders
- Ordination: 27 May 1684

Personal details
- Born: 26 May 1660 Jeduabrun
- Died: 5 March 1738 (age 77) Tarczyn, Poland

Adam Franciszek Ksawery Rostkowski (26 May 1660 – 5 March 1738) was a Roman Catholic prelate who served as Auxiliary Bishop of Lutsk (1700–1738), and a Polish writer and translator.

== Biography ==
Adam Franciszek Ksawery Rostkowski was born in Jeduabrun on 26 May 1660. He hailed from the Rostkowski noble family of Dąbrowa coat of arms. He attended Jesuit colleges in Łomża, Grodno and Warsaw. He was ordained a priest on 27 May 1684. Afterwards he studied in Rome and Ingolstadt. In 1692, he obtained a PhD in theology at the Sapienza University of Rome, and then he returned to Poland.

In 1695 he was a deputy to the Polish Crown Tribunal. On 10 May 1700, he was appointed during the papacy of Pope Innocent XII as Auxiliary Bishop of Łuck (Lutsk) and Titular Bishop of Philadelphia in Arabia. He wrote historical and legal books, brochures and translated French literature into Polish. In the 1733 Polish–Lithuanian royal election he supported Stanisław Leszczyński. He served as Auxiliary Bishop of Łuck until his death in Tarczyn on 5 March 1738.

== Episcopal succession ==
Episcopal succession of Adam Franciszek Ksawery Rostkowski

While bishop, he was the principal co-consecrator of:

- Krzysztof Andrzej Jan Szembek, Bishop of Chełm (1713);
- Jan Franciszek Kurdwanowski, Auxiliary Bishop of Warmia (1713);
- Feliks Ignacy Kretkowski, Bishop of Chelmno (1723);
- Aleksander Kazimierz Horain, Auxiliary Bishop of Samogitia (1732);
- Jan Aleksander Lipski, Bishop of Lutsk (1732);
- Adam Stanisław Grabowski, Auxiliary Bishop of Poznań (1733); and
- Antoni Sebastian Dembowski, Bishop of Płock (1737).

== External links and additional sources ==
- Cheney, David M. "Diocese of Lutsk". Catholic-Hierarchy.org. (for Chronology of Bishops) ^{[self-published]}
- Chow, Gabriel. "Diocese of Lutsk (Ukraine)". GCatholic.org. (for Chronology of Bishops) ^{[self-published]}
