= Łoś, Masovian Voivodeship =

Łoś
- Village
- Location within Poland
- Coordinates: 51°59′N 20°56′E
- Country: Poland
- Voivodeship: Masovian
- County: Piaseczno
- Gmina: Prażmów
- Population: 370
- Website: http://www.milosnicy.pl

Łoś [wɔɕ] is a village in the administrative district of Gmina Prażmów, within Piaseczno County, Masovian Voivodeship, in east-central Poland.
