= Przypki =

- Village
- Location within Poland
- Coordinates: 52°0′N 20°48′E
- Country: Poland
- Voivodeship: Masovian
- County: Piaseczno
- Gmina: Tarczyn

Przypki [ˈpʂɨpki] is a village in the administrative district of Gmina Tarczyn, within Piaseczno County, Masovian Voivodeship, in east-central Poland.
