= Gmina Tarczyn =

Gmina Tarczyn Tarczyn Commune
- Gmina
- Coat of arms
- Interactive map of Gmina Tarczyn
- Coordinates (Tarczyn): 51°58′43″N 20°50′1″E
- Country: Poland
- Voivodeship: Masovian
- County: Piaseczno
- Seat: Tarczyn

Area
  - Total: 114.15 km^{2} (44.07 sq mi)

Population (2006)
  - Total: 10,522
  - Density: 92.177/km^{2} (238.74/sq mi)
  - Urban: 3,886
  - Rural: 6,636
- Website: http://www.tarczyn.pl

Gmina Tarczyn is an urban-rural gmina (administrative district) in Piaseczno County, Masovian Voivodeship, in east-central Poland. Its seat is the town of Tarczyn, which lies approximately 16 kilometres (10 mi) south-west of Piaseczno and 29 km (18 mi) south-west of Warsaw.

The gmina covers an area of 114.15 square kilometres (44.1 sq mi), and as of 2006 its total population is 10,522 (out of which the population of Tarczyn amounts to 3,886, and the population of the rural part of the gmina is 6,636).

The gmina contains part of the protected area called Chojnów Landscape Park.

== Villages ==
Apart from the town of Tarczyn, Gmina Tarczyn contains the villages and settlements of Borowiec, Brominy, Bystrzanów, Cieśle, Drozdy, Duki, Gąski, Gładków, Grzędy, Grzywiczówka, Janówek, Jeżewice, Jeziorzany, Józefowice, Julianów, Kawęczyn, Kolonia Jeziorzany, Kolonia Świętochów, Komorniki, Komorniki Kolonia, Kopana, Korzeniówka, Kotorydz, Księżak, Księżowola, Leśna Polana, Leśniczówka Mirchów, Many, Marianka, Marylka, Nosy, Nowa Wieś, Nowe Racibory, Pamiątka, Parcele Jeżewice, Pawłowice, Pawłowice Kopana, Popielarze, Prace Duże, Prace Duże-Kolonia, Prace Małe, Przypki, Racibory, Rembertów, Ruda, Skrzeczeniec, Stara Kopana, Stara Wieś, Stefanówka, Suchodół, Suchostruga, Świętochów, Tarnówka, Werdun, Wola Przypkowska-Kolonia, Wólka Jeżewska and Wylezin.

== Neighbouring gminas ==
Gmina Tarczyn is bordered by the gminas of Grójec, Lesznowola, Nadarzyn, Piaseczno, Pniewy, Prażmów and Żabia Wola.
