= Grzędy, Masovian Voivodeship =

Grzędy
- Village
- Location within Poland
- Coordinates: 52°0′N 20°49′E
- Country: Poland
- Voivodeship: Masovian
- County: Piaseczno
- Gmina: Tarczyn

Grzędy [ˈɡʐɛndɨ] is a village in the administrative district of Gmina Tarczyn, within Piaseczno County, Masovian Voivodeship, in east-central Poland.
