= Kawęczyn, Gmina Tarczyn =

Kawęczyn
- Village
- Location within Poland
- Coordinates: 51°56′N 20°54′E
- Country: Poland
- Voivodeship: Masovian
- County: Piaseczno
- Gmina: Tarczyn

Kawęczyn [kaˈvɛnt͡ʂɨn] is a village in the administrative district of Gmina Tarczyn, within Piaseczno County, Masovian Voivodeship, in east-central Poland.
