= Joanna Bartel =

Polish actress (born 1951)

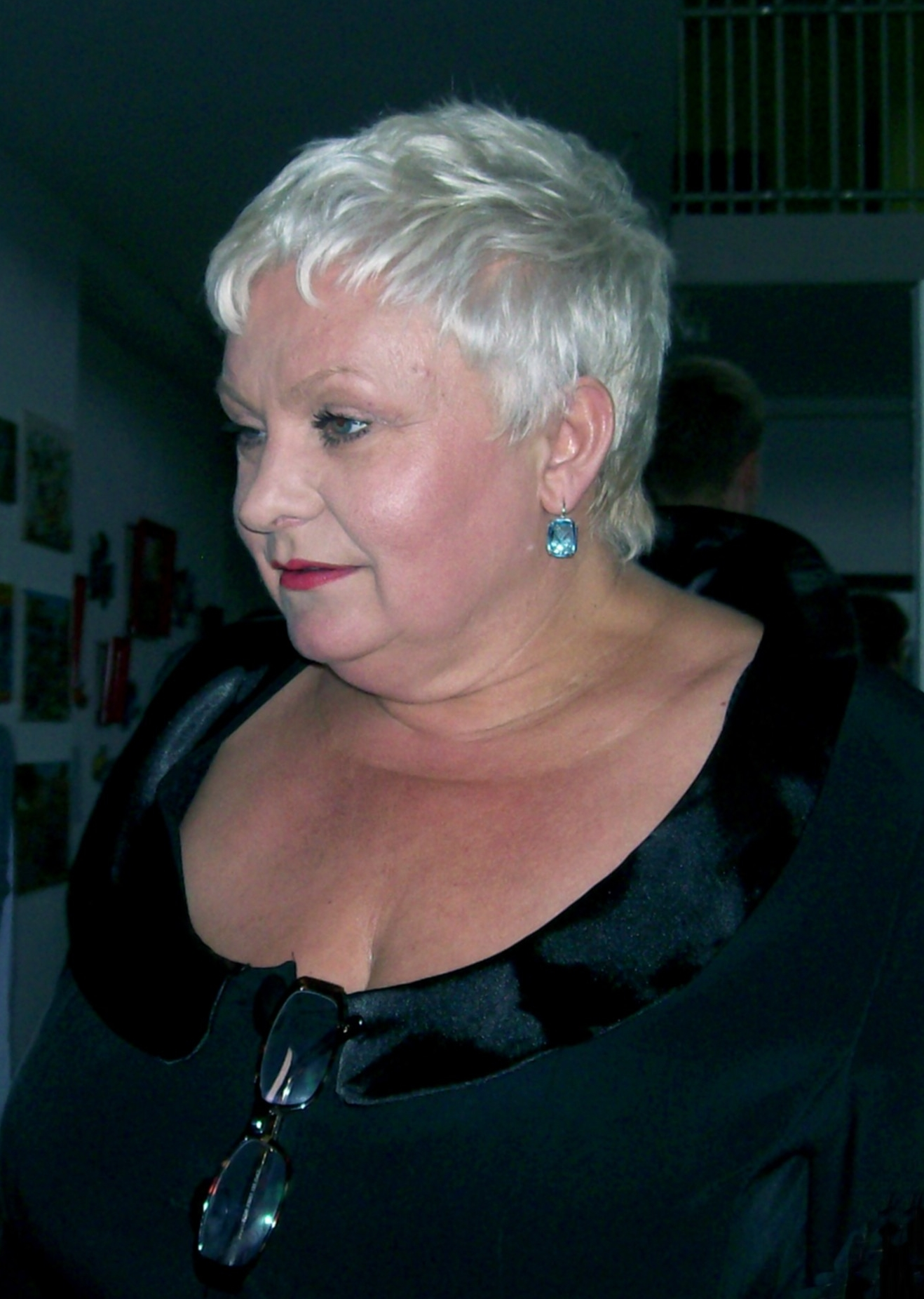
- Joanna Bartel, 2009
- Born: 29 December 1952 (age 73); Świętochłowice, Poland

Joanna Bartel (born 29 December 1952) is a Polish actress, cabaret artist, singer and announcer. From her education she is painter. Currently she occurs in cabaret program Tok Szok.

In Poland she is best known from main role in Polish TV series Święta wojna in TVP2, but also lead license American programs Śmiechu warte (America's Funniest Home Videos) in TVP1.

== Filmography ==
- 1981: Białe tango (8th episode)
- 1982: Alicja as Dozorczyni (caretaker). She sang a song too.
- 1986: Komedianci z wczorajszej ulicy as Adela (and author of song)
- 1987: Sławna jak Sarajewo as Cyla
- from 1999: Święta wojna as Andzia Dworniok
- 2005: Skazany na bluesa as Krystyna Riedel
- 2007: Ryś - Krysia Wafelówa's voice
- 2010: Milion dolarów – manager in Klub Emeryta (club for pensioners)
