= Gmina Prażmów =

Gmina Prażmów Prażmów Commune
- Gmina
- Coat of arms
- Interactive map of Gmina Prażmów
- Coordinates (Prażmów): 51°56′44″N 20°56′58″E
- Country: Poland
- Voivodeship: Masovian
- County: Piaseczno
- Seat: Prażmów

Area
  - Total: 86.11 km^{2} (33.25 sq mi)

Population (2006)
  - Total: 8,554
  - Density: 99.34/km^{2} (257.3/sq mi)
- Website: http://prazmow.go.pl

Gmina Prażmów is a rural gmina (administrative district) in Piaseczno County, Masovian Voivodeship, in east-central Poland. Its seat is the village of Prażmów, which lies approximately 15 kilometres (9 mi) south of Piaseczno and 31 km (19 mi) south of Warsaw.

The gmina covers an area of 86.11 square kilometres (33.2 sq mi), and as of 2006 its total population is 8,554.

The gmina contains part of the protected area called Chojnów Landscape Park.

== Villages ==
Gmina Prażmów contains the villages and settlements of Biały Ług, Błonie, Bronisławów, Chosna, Dobrzenica, Gabryelin, Jaroszowa Wola, Jeziórko, Kamionka, Kędzierówka, Kolonia Gościeńczyce, Koryta, Krępa, Krupia Wólka, Ławki, Łoś, Ludwików, Nowe Wągrodno, Nowy Prażmów, Piskórka, Prażmów, Ustanów, Uwieliny, Wągrodno, Wilcza Wólka, Wola Prażmowska, Wola Wągrodzka, Zadębie and Zawodne.

== Neighbouring gminas ==
Gmina Prażmów is bordered by the gminas of Chynów, Góra Kalwaria, Grójec, Piaseczno and Tarczyn.
