= Zbigniew Buczkowski =

Polish actor and entertainer

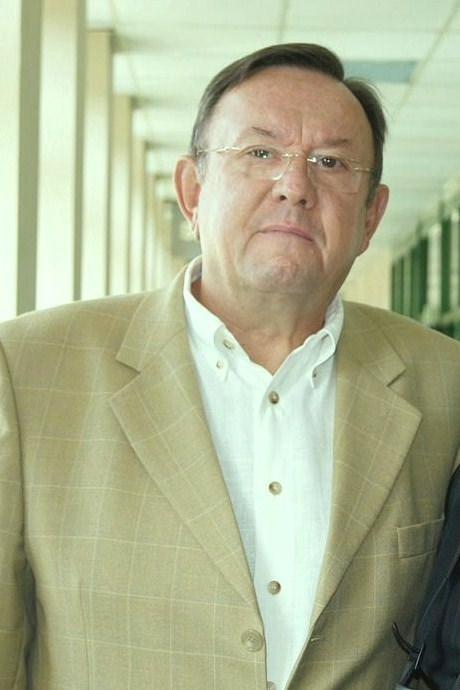
- Born: 20 March 1951 (age 74); Warsaw
- Occupation: Actor

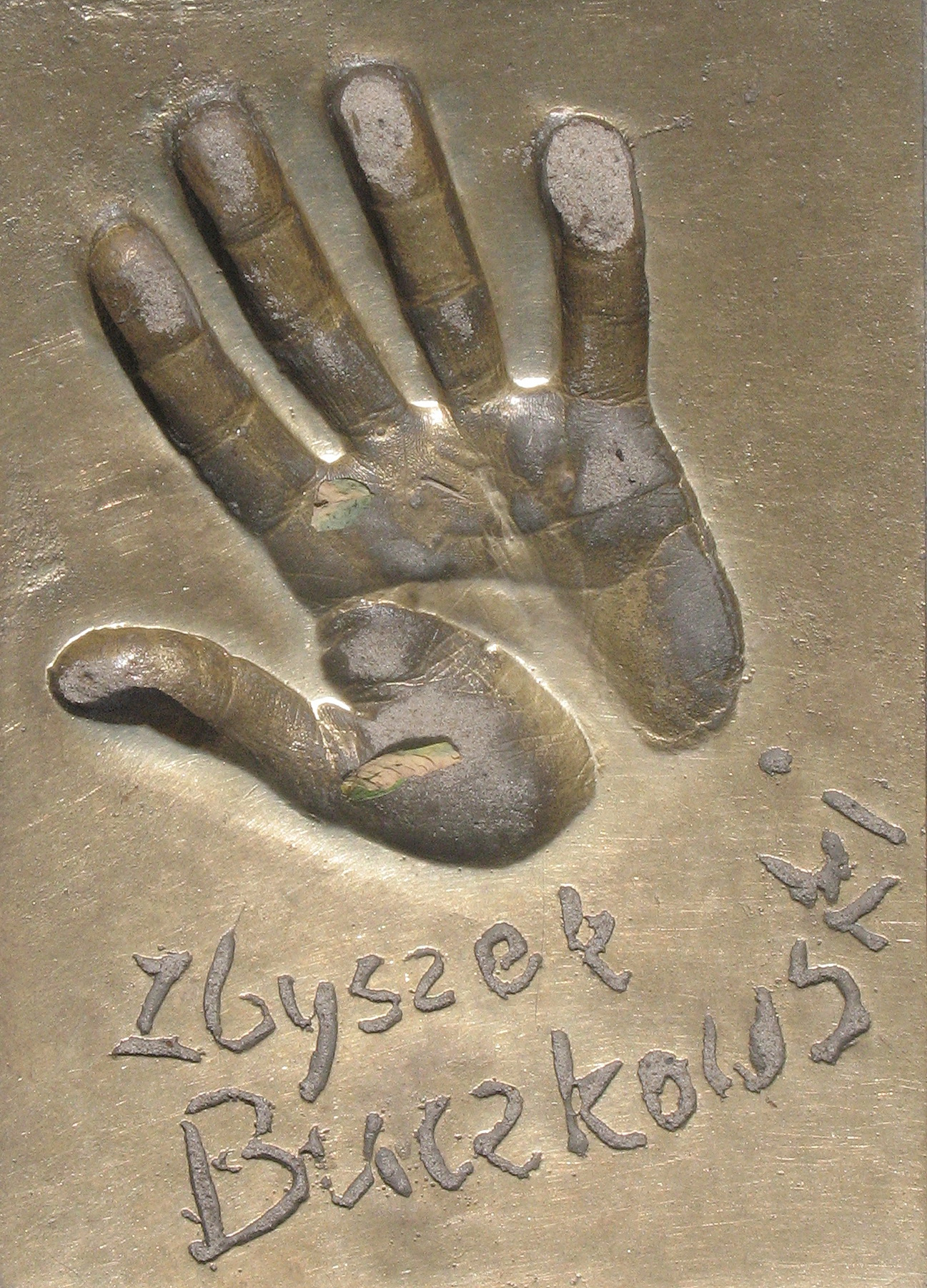
Handprint & autograph of Z. Buczkowski in Stars Avenue in Międzyzdroje

Zbigniew Buczkowski (born 20 March 1951 in Warsaw) is a Polish film actor and entertainer.

== Biography ==
He is a son of Marian Buczkowski, a pilot at LOT Polish Airlines who died in a plane crash in 1951.

He lived next door to a film studio where his neighbor worked as a film extra. With her help at the age of twelve he gained his first appearance as an extra in a film. In 1970 he graduated from the Technical School of Mechanical and Electrical Engineering in Warsaw. By chance Janusz Kondratiuk cast him in his film Dziewczyny do wzięcia in 1972. After being cast in the film, Buczkowski decided to drop his profession and devote himself to acting. He attempted to get into an acting school, but was unsuccessful. On 17 December 1983 he made his debut on the stage of the Comedy Theatre in Warsaw, in the play Koniec ery menelików directed by Janusz Kondratiuk and written by Andrzej Kondratiuk (as a scientist and violinist Stasio). In 1986 he passed his exams as an extra.

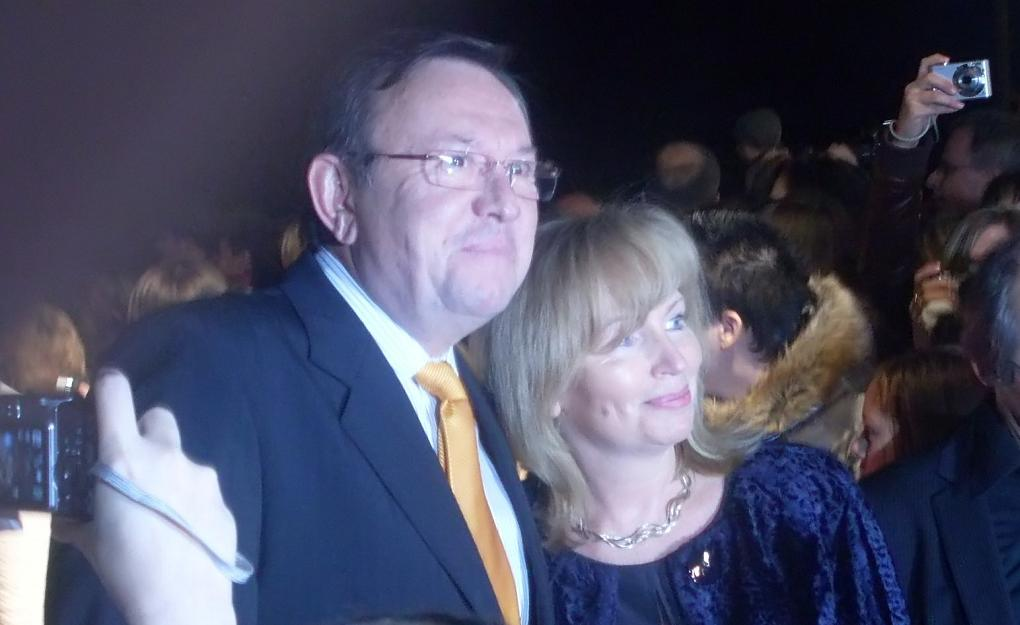
Zbigniew Buczkowski with his wife in 2008

He gained notoriety through his appearances on Dom, Graczykowie and Święta wojna.

In 2014, he published his autobiography entitled "Pisz pan książkę!"

== Personal life ==
He has two brothers. Since 1981 he has been married to Jolanta. They have a daughter, Małgorzata (an economist) and a son Michał (a lawyer). He lives in Piaseczno. On 7 October 2010 he was fined six thousand zlotys by the District Court in Suwałki for fraudulently obtaining a certificate of completion of a driving training course.

== Awards ==
- 2003 – Imprinting his hand on the Promenade of Stars during the VIII Festival of Stars in Międzyzdroje
- 2004 – Crystal Pomegranate for winning the Best Comedy Actor Audience Choice award at the Eighth Comedy Film Festival in Lubomierz
- 2009 – Monidło Award for Best Actor (non-professional) awarded during the festival of John Himilsbach in Mińsk Mazowiecki
