= Prażmów, Masovian Voivodeship =

Prażmów
- Village
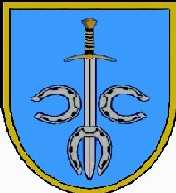
- Coat of arms

- Location within Poland
- Coordinates: 51°56′44″N 20°56′58″E
- Country: Poland
- Voivodeship: Masovian
- County: Piaseczno
- Gmina: Prażmów
- Population: 403
- Website: http://prazmow.go.pl

Prażmów [ˈpraʐmuf] is a village in Piaseczno County, Masovian Voivodeship, in east-central Poland. It is the seat of the gmina (administrative district) called Gmina Prażmów.
