= Piaseczno County =

Piaseczno County Powiat piaseczyński
- County
- Flag Coat of arms

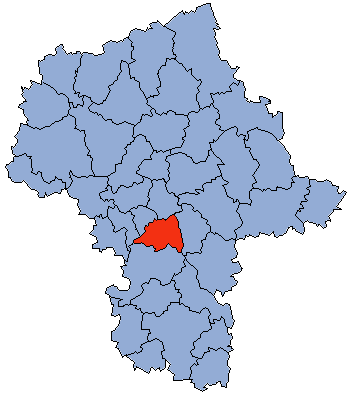
- Location within the voivodeship

- Division into gminas
- Coordinates (Piaseczno): 52°4′0″N 21°1′0″E
- Country: Poland
- Voivodeship: Masovian
- Seat: Piaseczno
- Gminas: Total 6: Gmina Góra Kalwaria; Gmina Konstancin-Jeziorna; Gmina Lesznowola; Gmina Piaseczno; Gmina Prażmów; Gmina Tarczyn

Area
  - Total: 621.04 km^{2} (239.78 sq mi)

Population (2019)
  - Total: 186,460
  - Density: 300.24/km^{2} (777.61/sq mi)
  - Urban: 81,465
  - Rural: 104,995
- Car plates: WPI
- Website: www.piaseczno.pl

Piaseczno County (Polish: Powiat piaseczyński) is a unit of territorial administration and local government (powiat) in Masovian Voivodeship, east-central Poland. It came into being on January 1, 1999, as a result of the Polish local government reforms passed in 1998. Its administrative seat and largest town is Piaseczno, which lies 17 kilometres (11 mi) south of Warsaw. The county contains three other towns: Konstancin-Jeziorna, 8 km (5 mi) east of Piaseczno, Góra Kalwaria, 18 km (11 mi) south-east of Piaseczno, and Tarczyn, 16 km (10 mi) south-west of Piaseczno.

The county covers an area of 621.04 square kilometres (239.8 sq mi). As of 2019, its total population is 186,460; out of which, the population of Piaseczno is 48,286, that of Konstancin-Jeziorna is 17,023, that of Góra Kalwaria is 12,040, that of Tarczyn is 4,116, and the rural population is 81,465.

== Neighbouring counties ==
Piaseczno County is bordered by the city of Warsaw to the north, Otwock County to the east, Grójec County to the south, Grodzisk County to the west and Pruszków County to the north-west.

== Administrative divisions ==
The county is subdivided into six gminas (four urban-rural and two rural). These are listed in the following table, in descending order of population.

Gmina	Type	Area (km^{2})	Population (2019)	Seat
Gmina Piaseczno	urban-rural	128.2	84,469	Piaseczno
Gmina Lesznowola	rural	69.2	27,844	Lesznowola
Gmina Góra Kalwaria	urban-rural	142.6	26,863	Góra Kalwaria
Gmina Konstancin-Jeziorna	urban-rural	78.3	24,673	Konstancin-Jeziorna
Gmina Tarczyn	urban-rural	114.2	11,506	Tarczyn
Gmina Prażmów	rural	86.1	11,105	Prażmów
