= Zgorzała (disambiguation) =

Zgorzała may refer to:

- Zgorzała, a village in Piaseczno County, Masovian Voivodeship, Poland
- Zgorzała nad Jeziorem, a neighbourhood in Warsaw, Masovian Voivodeship, Poland
- Zagorzała (lake), a lake in Warsaw, Poland
