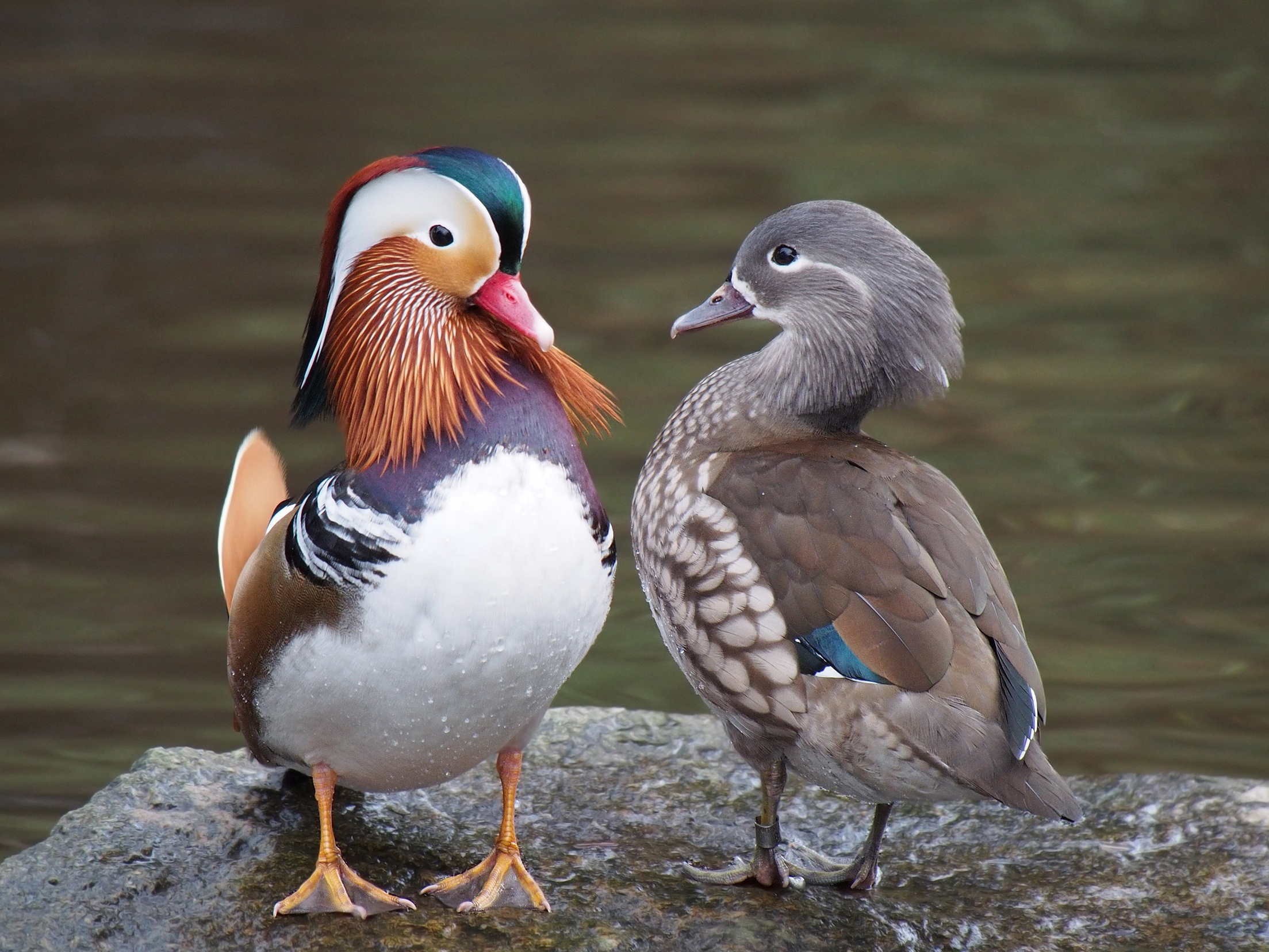
- Male and female mandarin ducks in Martin Mere, Lancashire, England

Conservation status
- Least Concern (IUCN 3.1)

Scientific classification
- Kingdom: Animalia
- Phylum: Chordata
- Class: Aves
- Order: Anseriformes
- Family: Anatidae
- Genus: Aix
- Species: A. galericulata

Binomial name
- Aix galericulata (Linnaeus, 1758)
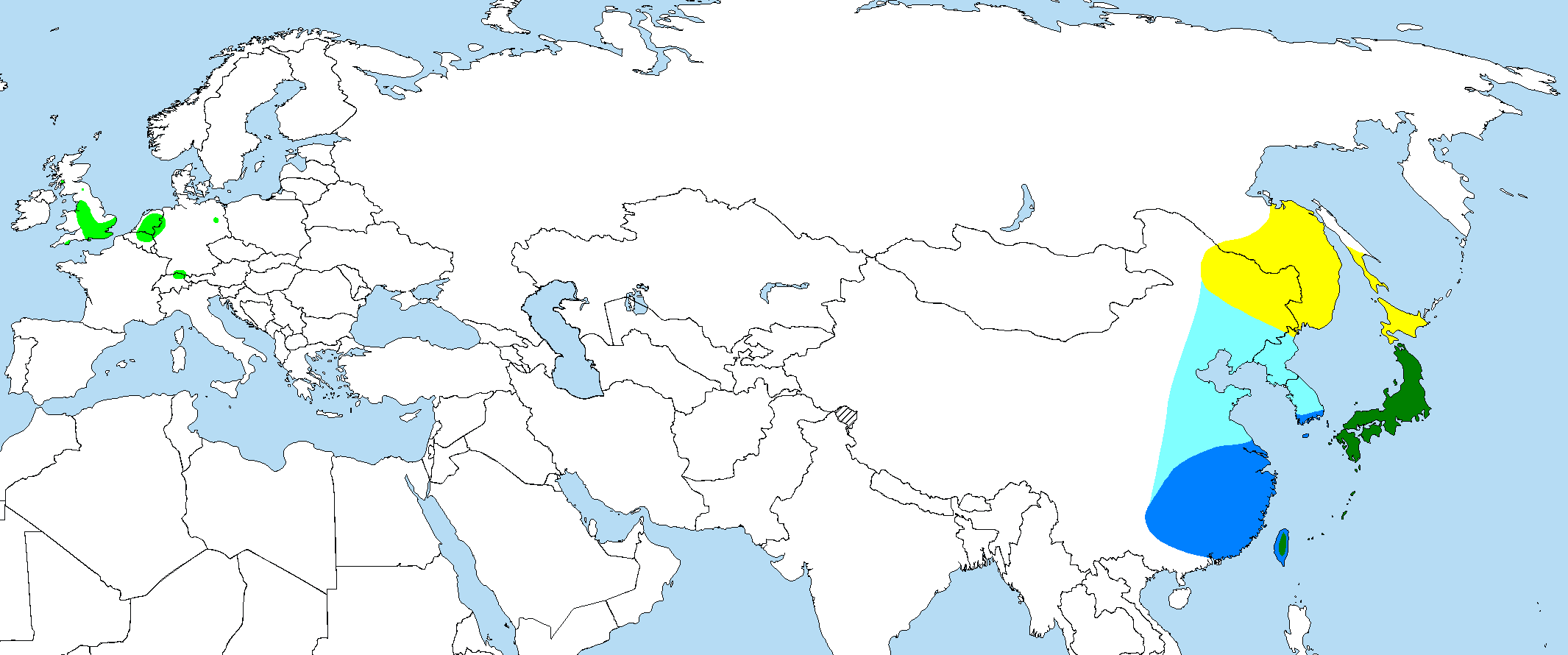
- The native range of the mandarin duck, and parts of its introduced range where it is established breeding Breeding summer visitor Breeding resident Passage migrant Winter visitor Introduced breeding resident

Synonyms
- Anas galericulata Linnaeus, 1758

= Mandarin duck =

Mandarin duck Temporal range: Pleistocene–present, 0.8 – 0 Mya

Species of bird

The mandarin duck (Aix galericulata) is a perching duck species native to East and Northeast Asia. It is sexually dimorphic; the males are elaborately coloured, while the females have more subdued colours. It is a medium-sized duck, at 41–49 cm (16–19 in) long with a 65–75 cm (26–30 in) wingspan. It is closely related to the North American wood duck, the only other member of the genus Aix. 'Aix' is an Ancient Greek word which was used by Aristotle to refer to an unknown diving bird, and 'galericulata' is the Latin for a wig, derived from galerum, a cap or bonnet. Outside of its native range, the mandarin duck has a large introduced population in the British Isles and Western Europe, with additional smaller introductions in North America.

== Taxonomy ==
The mandarin duck was described and illustrated in 1727 by the German explorer Engelbert Kaempfer in his The History of Japan. He wrote: "Of Ducks also there are several differing kinds, and as tame as the Geese. One kind particularly I cannot forbear mentioning, because of the surprising beauty of its male, call'd Kinmodsui, which is so great, that being shew'd its picture in colours, I could hardly believe my own Eyes, till I saw the Bird it self, it being a very common one." In 1747 the English naturalist George Edwards included an illustration and a description of the species in the second volume of his A Natural History of Uncommon Birds. He used the English name "The Chinese teal". He based his hand-coloured etching on a live specimen kept by the merchant Matthew Decker on his estate at Richmond in Surrey. Decker was a director of the East India Company. When in 1758 the Swedish naturalist Carl Linnaeus updated his Systema Naturae for the tenth edition, he placed the mandarin duck with the ducks and geese in the genus Anas. Linnaeus included a brief description, coined the binomial name Anas galericulata and cited the earlier publications. The mandarin duck is now placed together with the wood duck in the genus Aix that was introduced in 1828 by the German ornithologist Friedrich Boie. The species is monotypic: no subspecies are recognised. The genus name is the Ancient Greek word for an unknown diving bird mentioned by Aristotle. The specific epithet is from Latin galericulatum meaning a "peruke" or "wig".

=== Genetics ===
Mandarin duck unusually has 84 chromosomes, all acrocentric, compared to 80, often submetacentric, for other ducks; this makes successful hybridisation with other ducks very difficult, and possibly impossible, though this is disputed. Hybrids have been reported with six other duck species, but none of these have yet been verified.

== Description ==
The mandarin duck is among the smaller species of waterfowl, with a shorter body and smaller overall body size than most dabbling ducks, and is slightly smaller than its American wood duck relative. The adult male has a small red bill, large white crescent above the eye and reddish face and "whiskers". The male's breast is purple with two vertical white bars, the flanks ruddy, and has two orange 'sail' feathers at the back (modified 12th secondary flight feathers whose enlarged medial vane sticks up similar to boat sails). The female is similar to the female wood duck, with greyish-brown plumage, and a slender white eye-ring and stripe running back from the eye. The female is paler on the underside, has a small white flank stripe, and a pale tip to its bill.

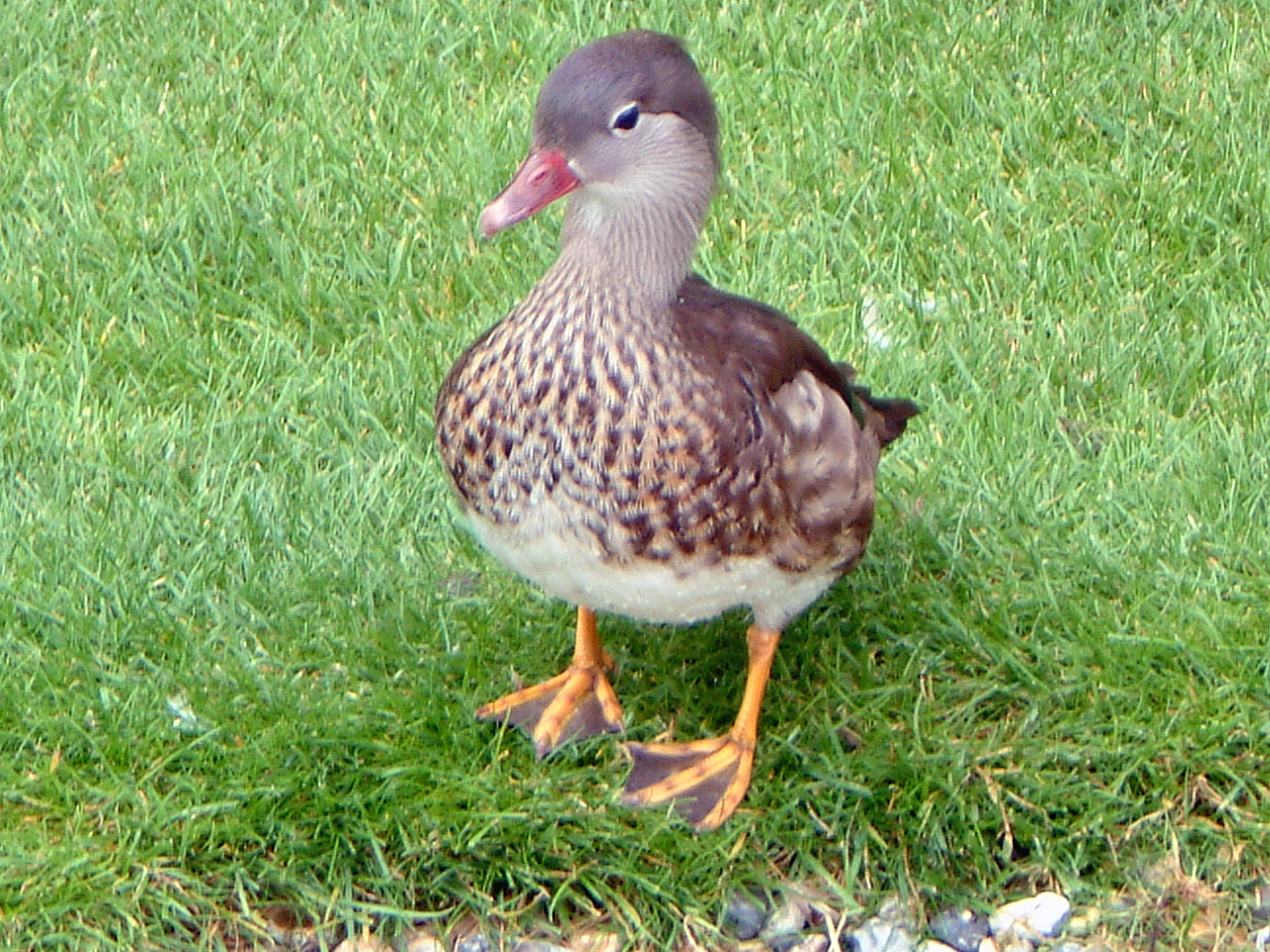
Drake in full eclipse plumage

Both the males and females have crests, but the purple crest is more pronounced on the male. Like many other species of ducks, the male undergoes a moult after the mating season into eclipse plumage. When in eclipse plumage, the male looks similar to the female, but can be distinguished by its bright yellow-orange or red beak, lack of any crest, and a less pronounced eye-stripe.

Mandarin duck ducklings are almost identical in appearance to wood duck ducklings, and very similar to mallard ducklings. The ducklings can be distinguished from mallard ducklings because the eye-stripe of mandarin duck ducklings (and wood duck ducklings) stops at the eye, while in mallard ducklings it reaches all the way to the bill.

== Distribution and habitat ==
The species was once widespread in East Asia, but large-scale exports and the destruction of its forest habitat had reduced populations in eastern Russia and in China to below 1,000 pairs in each country by the 1980s; Japan, however, was thought to still hold some 5,000 pairs. In China, the Mandarin duck has since been designated as a protected species. A survey in 2009 estimated the Mandarin duck population in China to be 12,000 – 14,000. The Asian populations are migratory, overwintering in lowland eastern China and southern Japan.

A fossil coracoid from the Middle Pleistocene of West Runton, England, was originally referred to this species and was thought to indicate a formerly much more extensive distribution. However this has now been reinterpreted as an indeterminate member of Anatinae.

Specimens frequently escape from collections, and in the 20th century, a large, feral population was established in Great Britain; more recently, small numbers have bred in Ireland, concentrated in the parks of Dublin. Now, about 7,000 are in Britain. Owing to its different habitat preferences compared to native water birds, the mandarin duck appears to have had no negative impacts on native wildfowl as a result of its introduction to the UK, as it does not engage in competition with other ducks over their habitats and occupies a previously-vacant ecological niche; it is generally not considered to be invasive. However, its expanding range means that it may compete with common goldeneye (Bucephala clangula), which also nests in trees.

Additional populations of mandarin ducks can be found on the European continent, the largest of which is in the region of Berlin. Isolated populations exist in the United States. The town of Black Mountain, North Carolina, has a limited population, and a free-flying feral population of several hundred mandarins exist in Sonoma County, California. This population is the result of several ducks escaping from captivity, then reproducing in the wild.

The habitats it prefers in its native breeding range are the dense, shrubby forested edges of rivers and lakes. It mostly occurs in low-lying areas, but it may breed in valleys at altitudes of up to 1,500 m (4,900 ft). In winter, it additionally occurs in marshes, flooded fields, and open rivers. While it prefers fresh water, it may also be seen wintering in coastal lagoons and estuaries. In its introduced European range, it lives in more open habitat than in its native range, around the edges of lakes, water meadows, and cultivated areas with woods nearby.

== Behaviour ==
Compared to other ducks, mandarin ducks are shy birds, preferring to seek cover under trees such as overhanging willows, and form smaller flocks, but when accustomed to humans may exhibit bolder behaviour.

=== Breeding ===
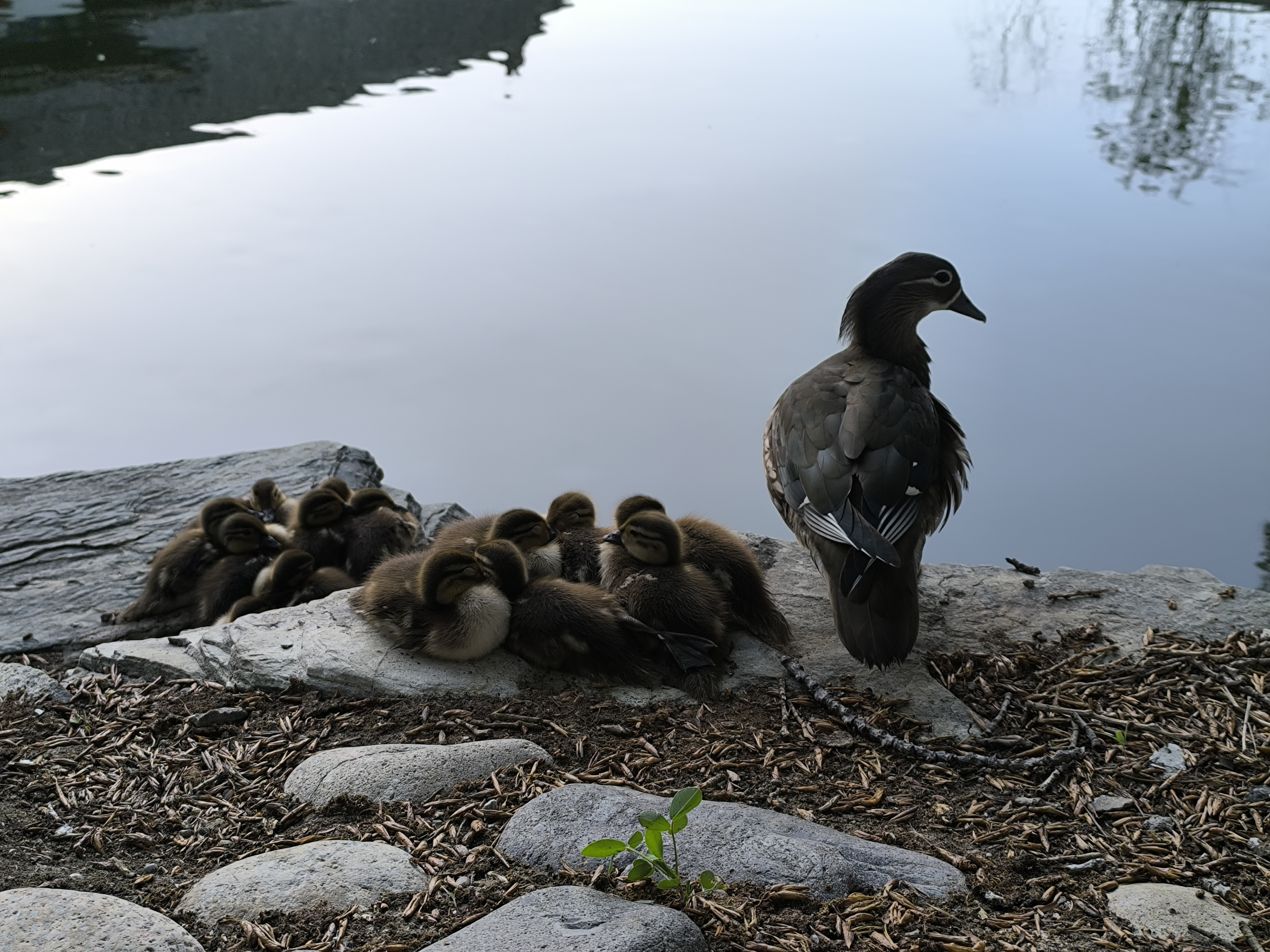
A mother with ducklings in Beijing, China

In the wild, mandarin ducks breed in densely wooded areas near shallow lakes, marshes or ponds. They nest in cavities in trees close to water during the spring. A single clutch of nine to twelve eggs is laid in April or May. Although the male may defend the brooding female and his eggs during incubation, he himself does not incubate the eggs and leaves before they hatch. Shortly after the ducklings hatch, their mother flies to the ground and coaxes the ducklings to leap from the nest. After all of the ducklings are out of the tree, they will follow their mother to a nearby body of water.

=== Food and feeding ===
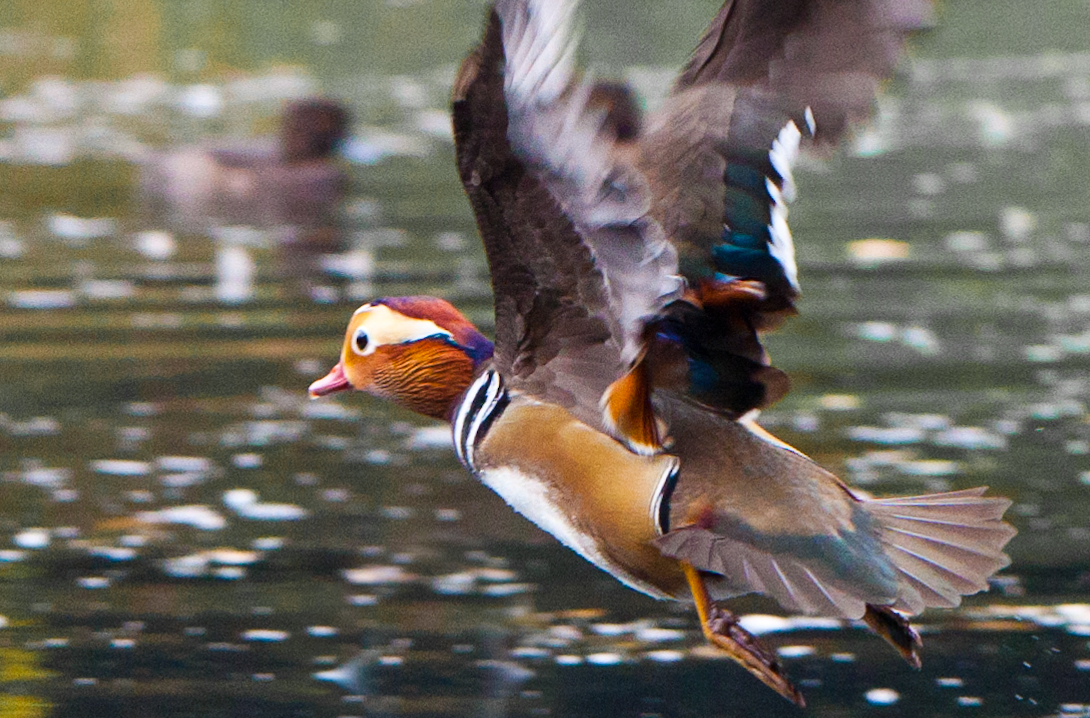
Male flying in Dublin, Ireland

Mandarins feed by dabbling or walking on land. They mainly eat plants and seeds, especially beech mast and acorns. The species will also add snails, insects and small fish to its diet. The diet of mandarin ducks changes seasonally; in the fall and winter, they mostly eat acorns and grain. In the spring, they mostly eat insects, snails, fish and aquatic plants. In the summer, they eat small worms, small fish, frogs, mollusks, and small snakes. They feed mainly near dawn or dusk, perching in trees or on the ground during the day.

=== Conspecific brood parasitism ===
Like many other bird species, Mandarin ducks display conspecific brood parasitism. Typically, Mandarin ducks lay their eggs in nests of their own relatives or other bird species. In the Zuojia Nature Reserve in Northeast China, 46.1% of Mandarin ducks were found to practice conspecific brood parasitism. Female ducks lay their eggs in different nests for a wide variety of reasons. For example, when there are nest limitations or there are few resources available, female ducks are more likely to practice conspecific brood parasitism. When females practice this behavior, they can benefit from a decrease in the costs from parental care and incubation. Additionally, female parasitic ducks can reduce their risks from predation.

While there was speculation that larger clutch sizes can lead to an increase in resource competition, research has found that the number of parasite eggs had no negative influence on the success of eggs from the host. Over generations, conspecific brood parasitism can increase the net number of offspring found within each generation. Overall, other duck species that have utilised this behaviour to lay their eggs were able to increase their reproductive success by more than double.

== Threats ==
Predation of the mandarin duck varies between different parts of its range. Mink, raccoon dogs, otters, polecats, Eurasian eagle-owls, and grass snakes are all predators of the mandarin duck. The greatest threat to the mandarin duck is habitat loss due to logging. Hunters are also a threat to the mandarin duck, because often they are unable to identify mandarin ducks in flight and as a result, many are shot by accident. Mandarin ducks are not hunted for food, but are still poached because their extreme beauty is prized.

== In captivity ==
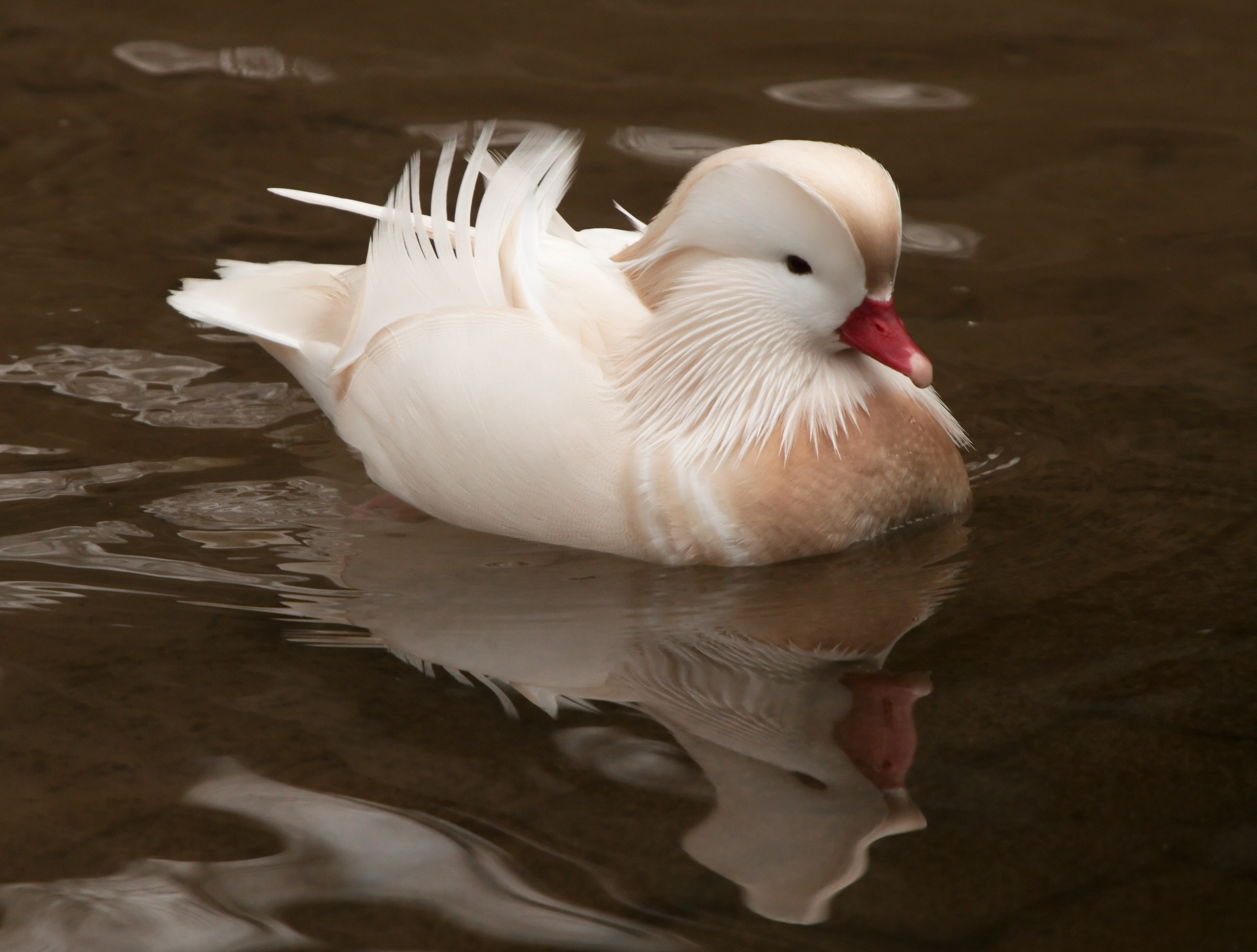
White Male at Ouwehands Dierenpark, Netherlands

Because of its striking plumage, mandarin ducks are very popular in zoos and waterfowl collections. Various mutations and domesticated breeds have been selected in captivity by duck breeders, the most common of which are pale ('silver') and white birds.

== In culture ==
=== Chinese culture ===
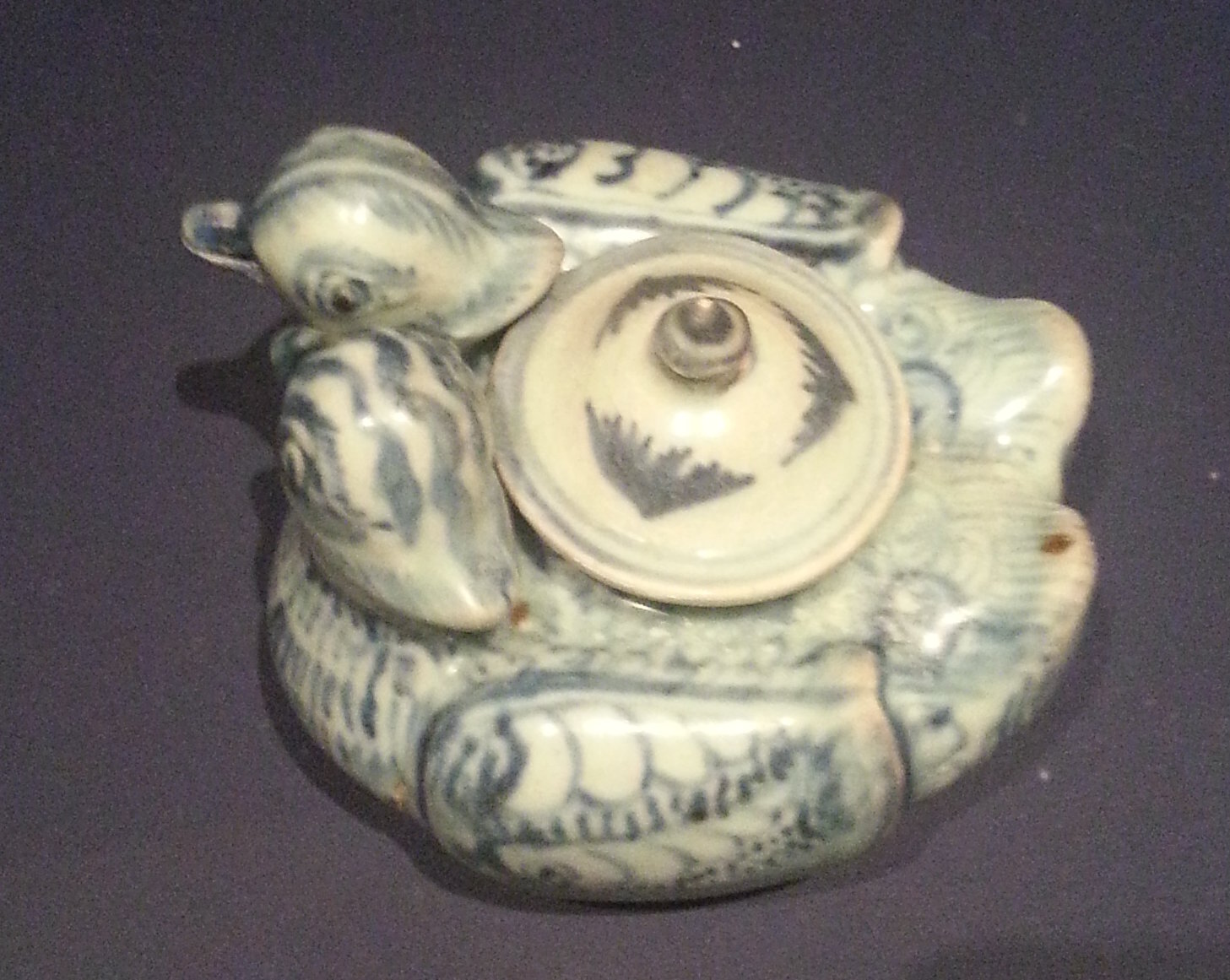
A Yuan dynasty porcelain teapot representing a mandarin duck pair

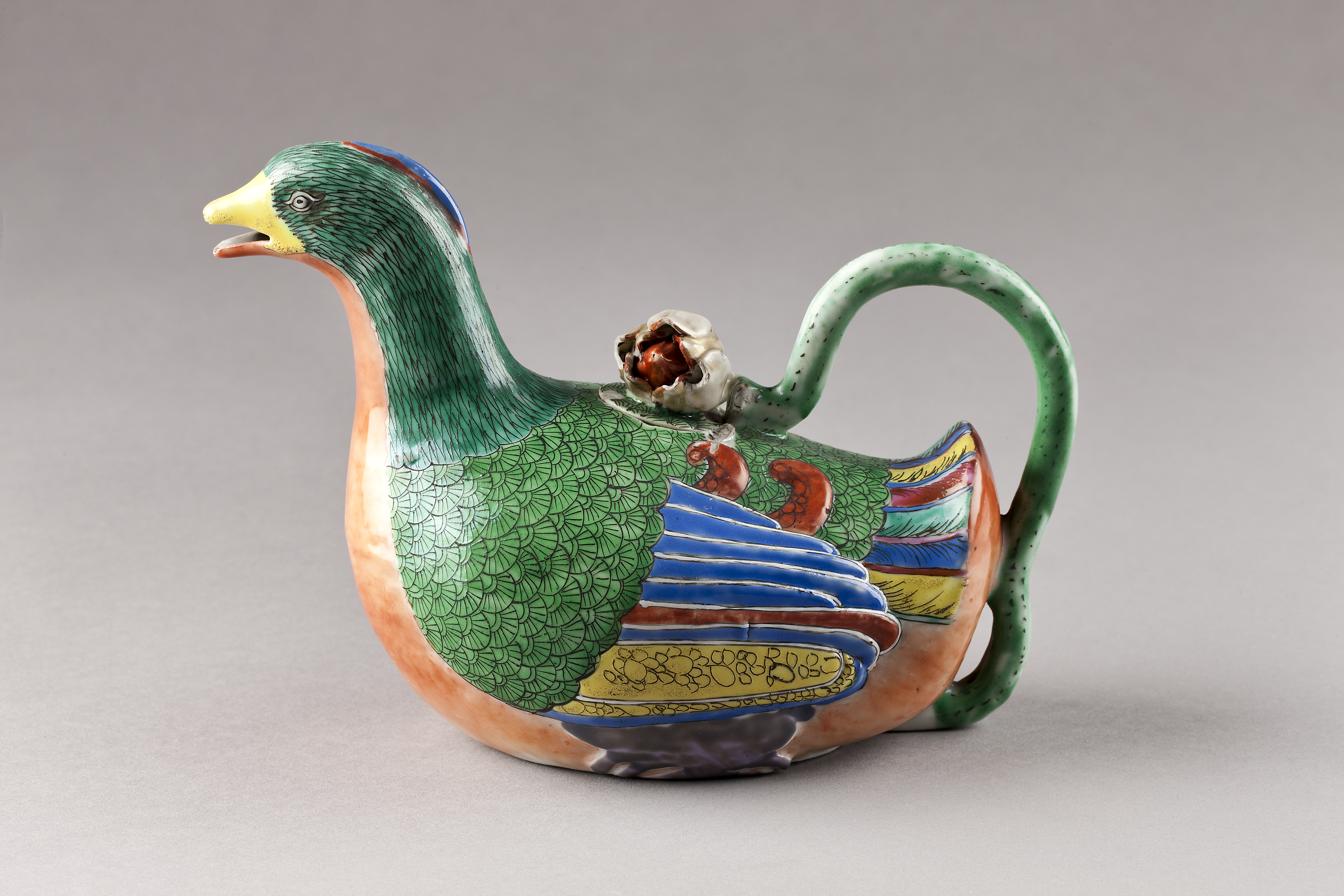
Porcelain winepot in the form of a mandarin duck, decorated in overglaze enamels, Qing dynasty, circa 1760

The Chinese refer to mandarin ducks as yuanyang (simplified Chinese: 鸳鸯; traditional Chinese: 鴛鴦; pinyin: yuānyāng), where 'yuan' (鴛) and 'yang' (鴦) respectively stand for male and female mandarin ducks. In traditional Chinese culture, mandarin ducks are believed to be lifelong couples, unlike other species of ducks. Hence they are regarded as a symbol of conjugal affection and fidelity, and are frequently featured in Chinese art.

A Chinese proverb for loving couples uses the mandarin duck as a metaphor: "Two mandarin ducks playing in water" (simplified Chinese: 鸳鸯戏水; traditional Chinese: 鴛鴦戲水; pinyin: yuānyāng xì shuǐ). A mandarin duck symbol is also used in Chinese weddings because in traditional Chinese lore, they symbolize wedded bliss and fidelity. Because the male and female plumages of the mandarin duck are so unalike, 'yuan-yang' is frequently used colloquially in Cantonese to mean an "odd couple" or "unlikely pair" – a mixture of two different types of the same category; for example, the drink yuanyang and yuan-yang fried rice. Mandarin ducks featured on the flag of Weihaiwei during British rule.

=== Korean culture ===
For Koreans, mandarin ducks represent peace, fidelity, and plentiful offspring. Similar to the Chinese, they believe that these ducks mate for life. For these reasons, pairs of wooden-carved mandarin ducks called wedding ducks are often given as wedding gifts and play a significant role in Korean marriage.

=== Japanese culture ===
Similarly, in Japanese the ducks are called oshidori (おしどり/オシドリ/鴛鴦) and are used in the phrase oshidori fūfu (おしどり夫婦, "a couple of lovebirds/happily married couple"). In addition, the Crown Prince wears the Sokutai embroidered with a pattern featuring oshidori.

== Gallery ==
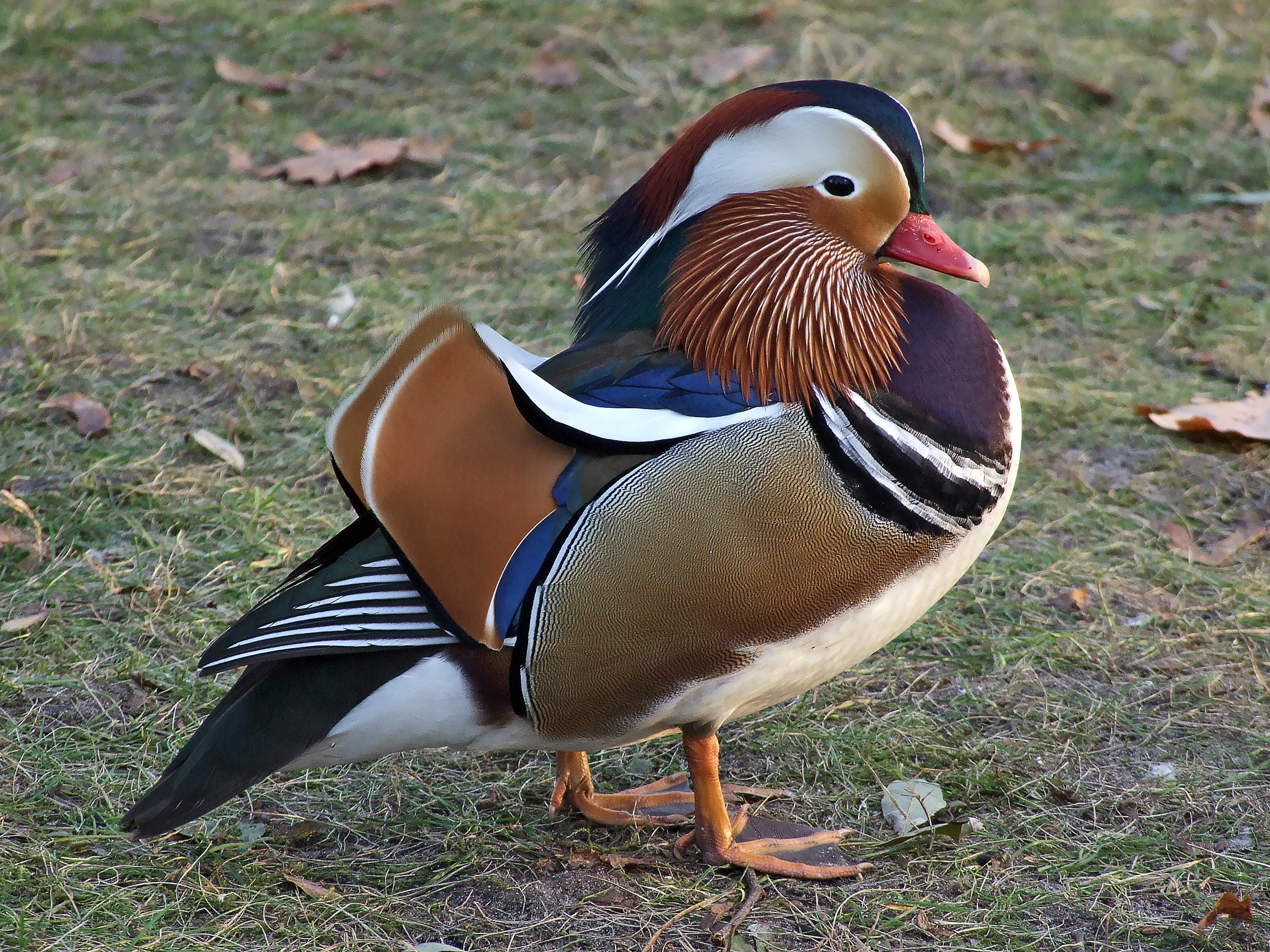
Mandarin Drake at Łazienki Park, Poland

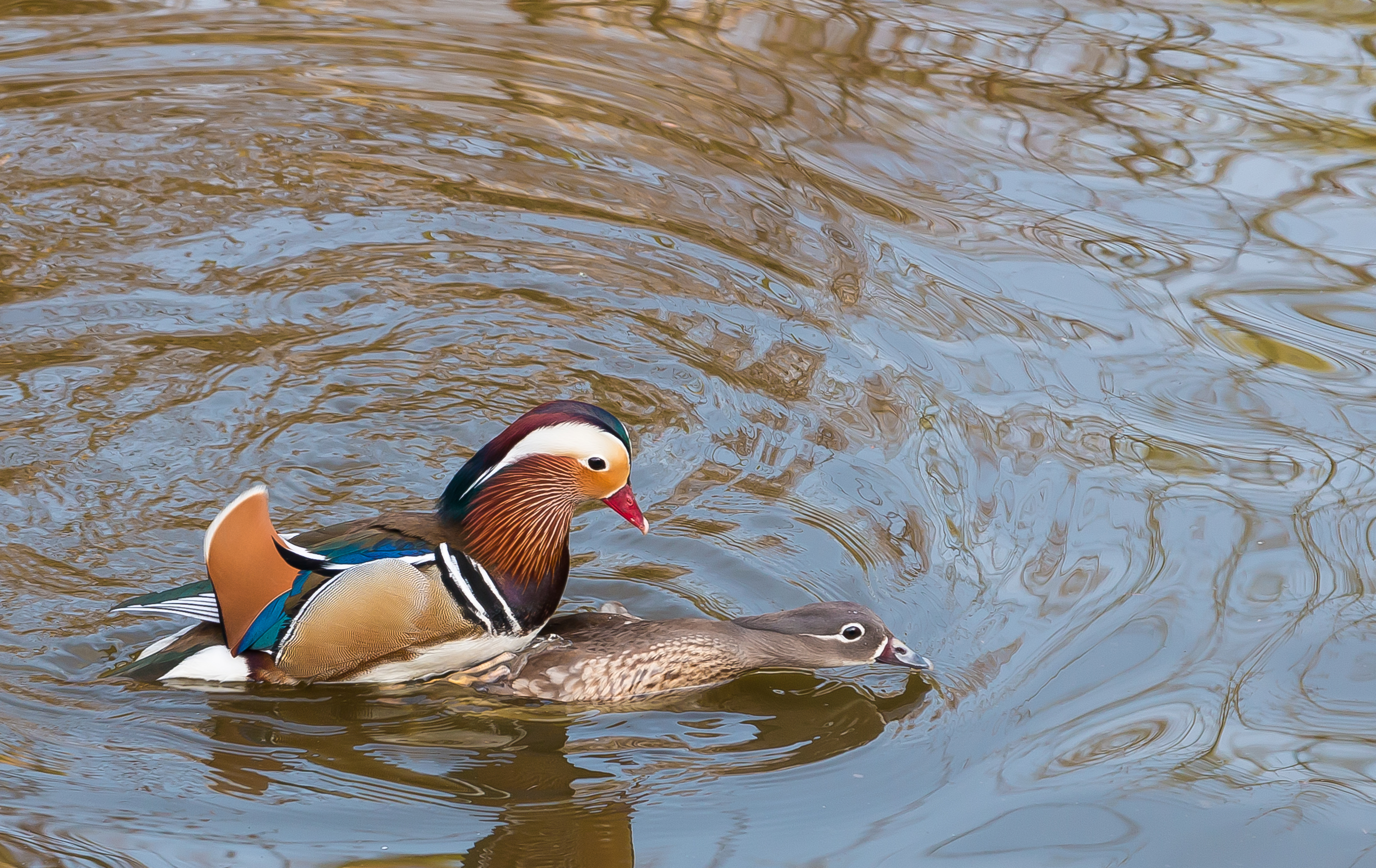
Mating Pair at Rotterdam's Blijdorp Zoo, Netherlands.

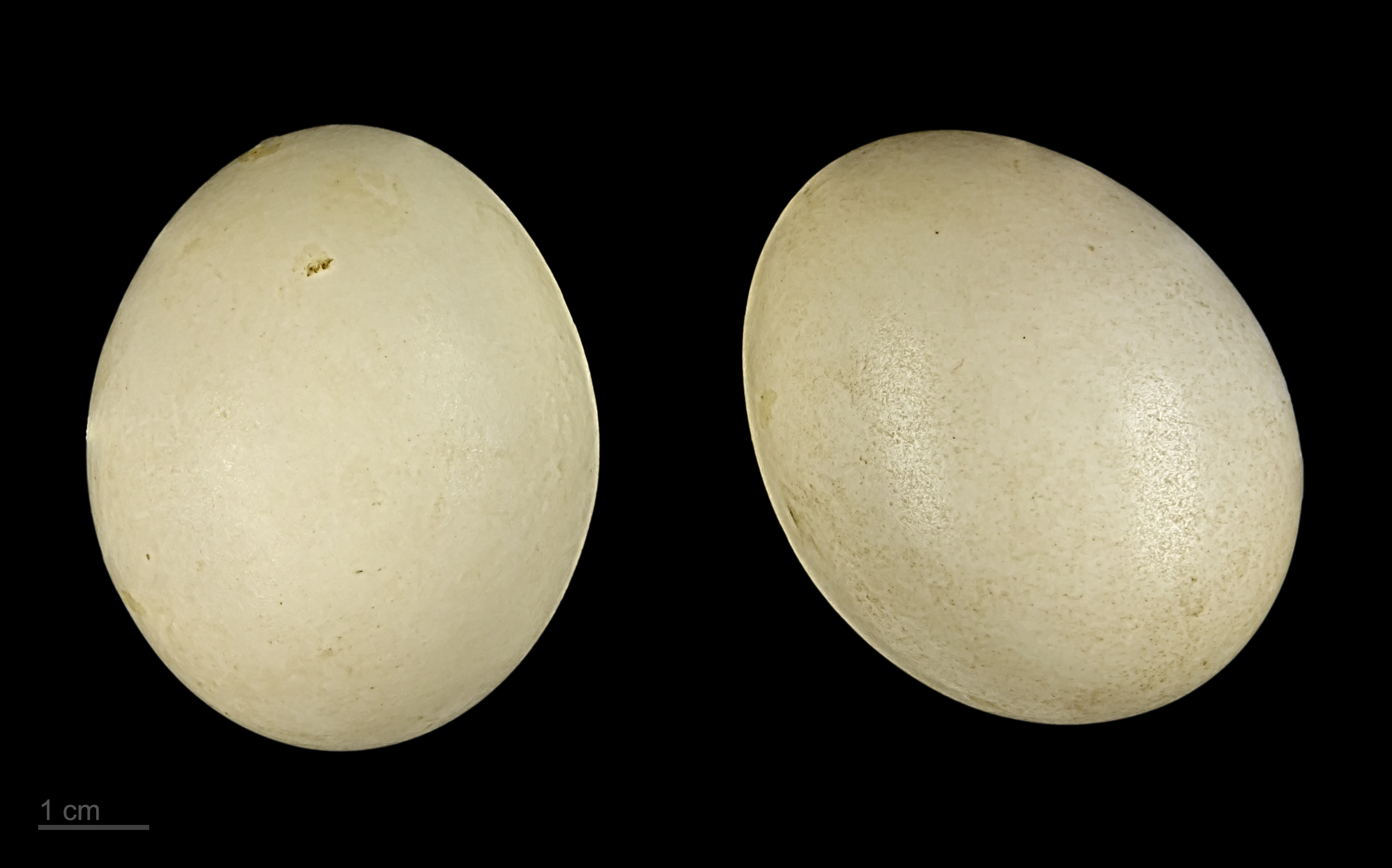
Eggs

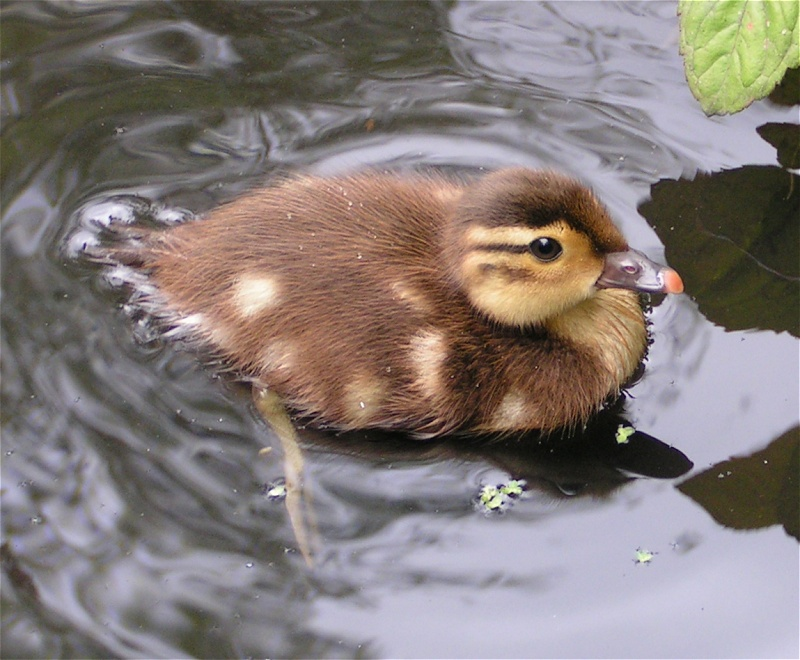
Duckling at Osterley Park, London

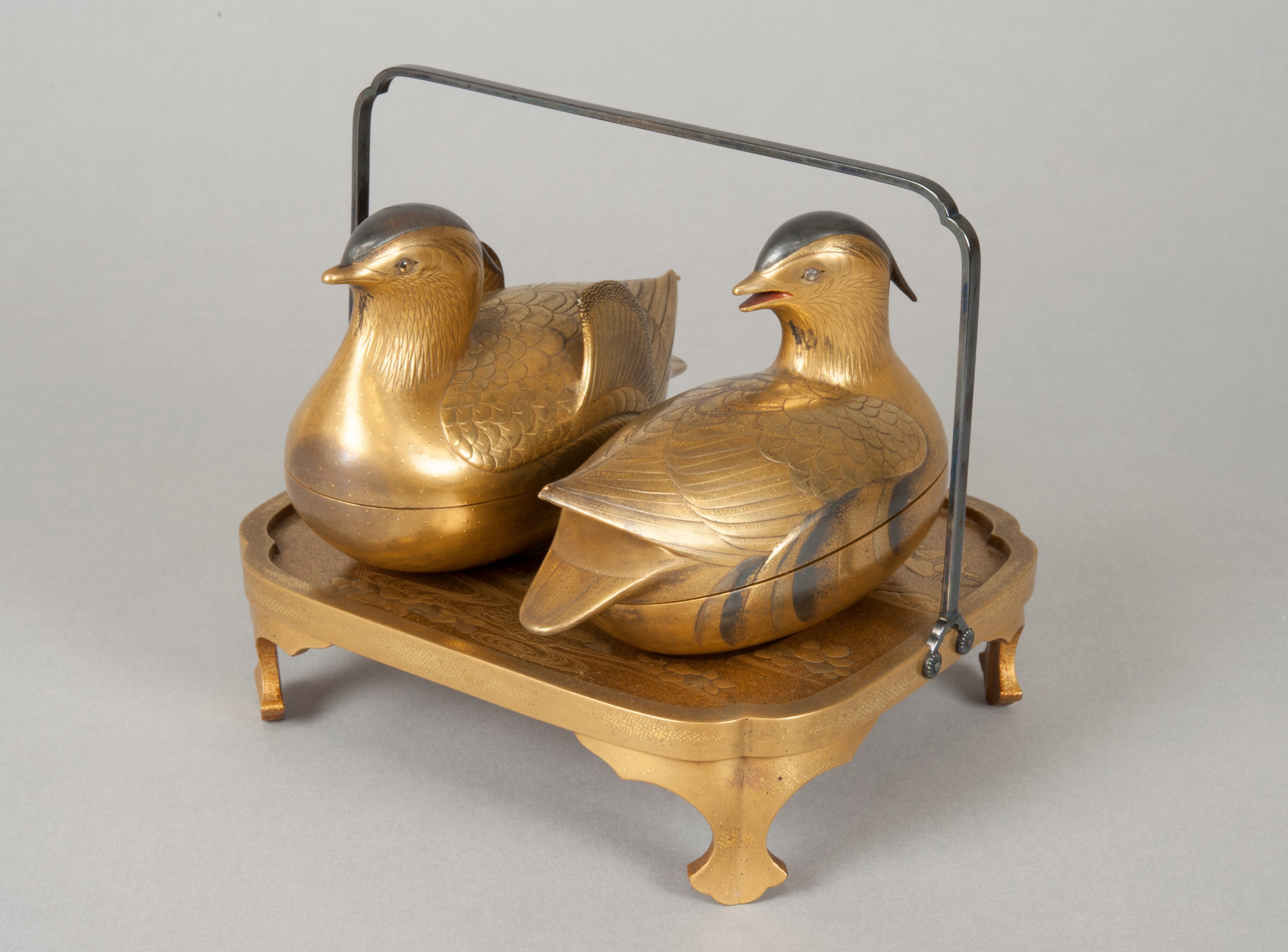
A pair of Incense boxes shaped like mandarin ducks

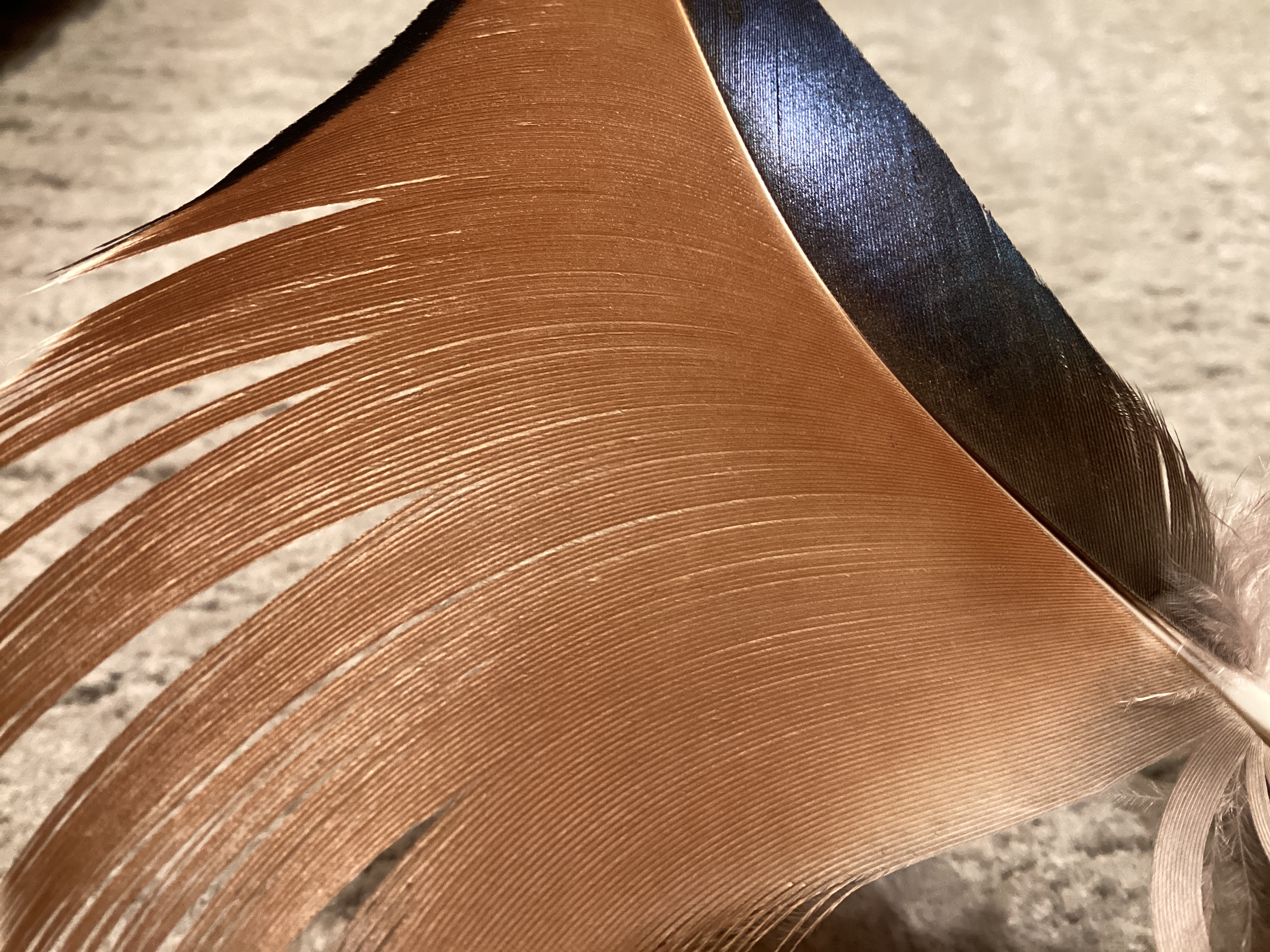
The Sail feathers of a Mandarin duck from the Alojamientos y Recreo Romero, Perú

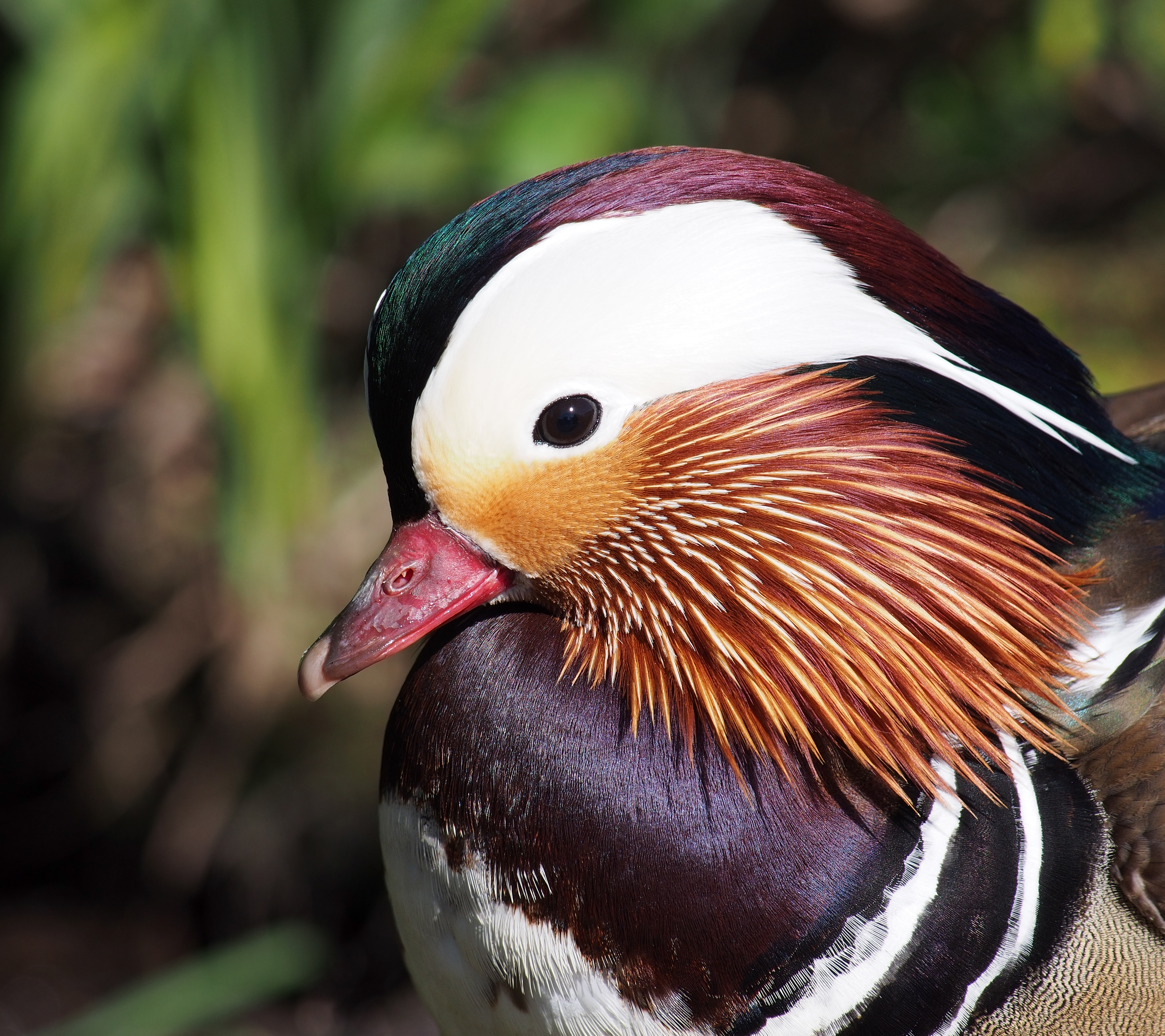
Portrait of a male at Martin Mere, England

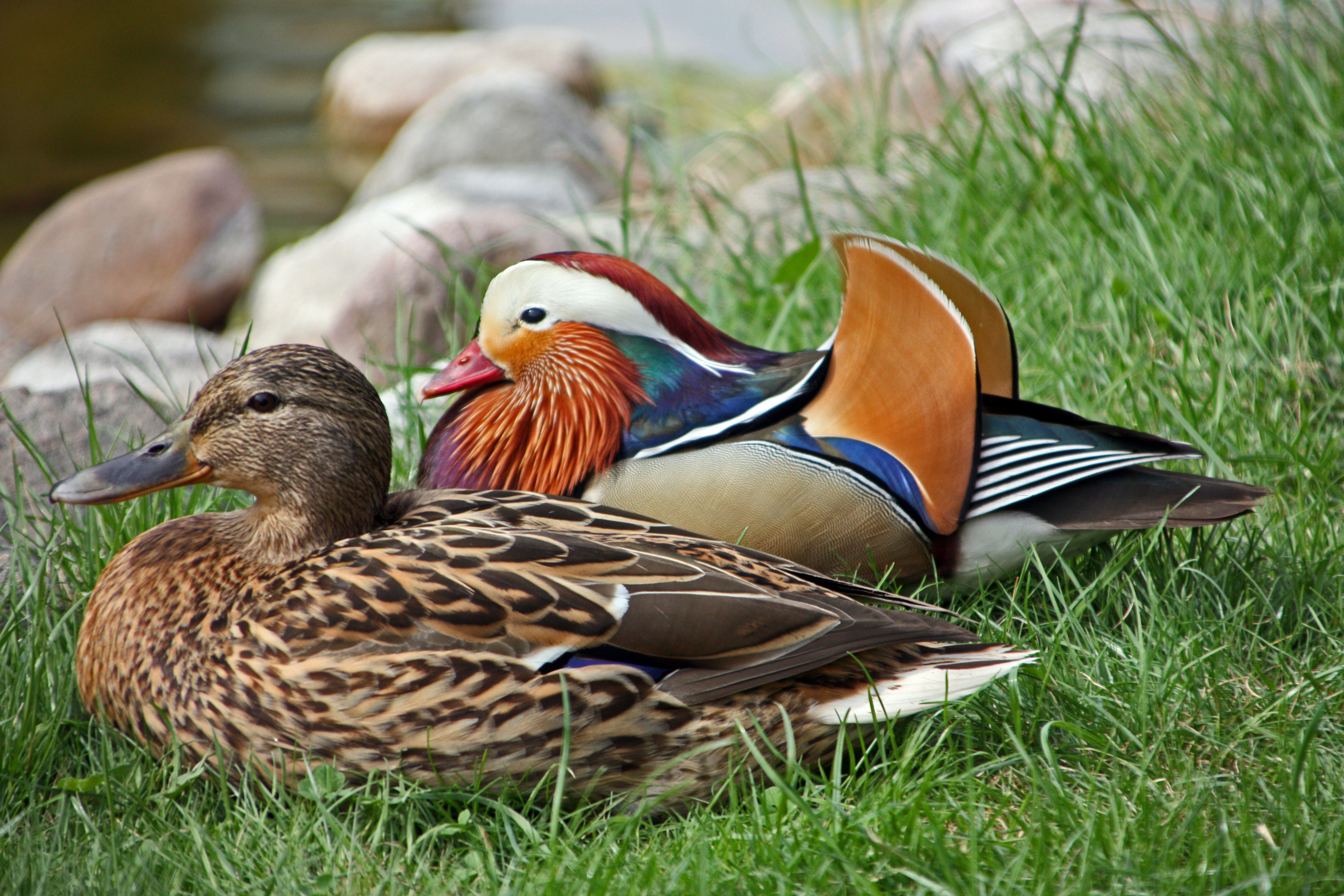
Mandarin Drake alongside a Female Mallard in Stara Iwiczna, Poland
