= Podolszyn =

- Village
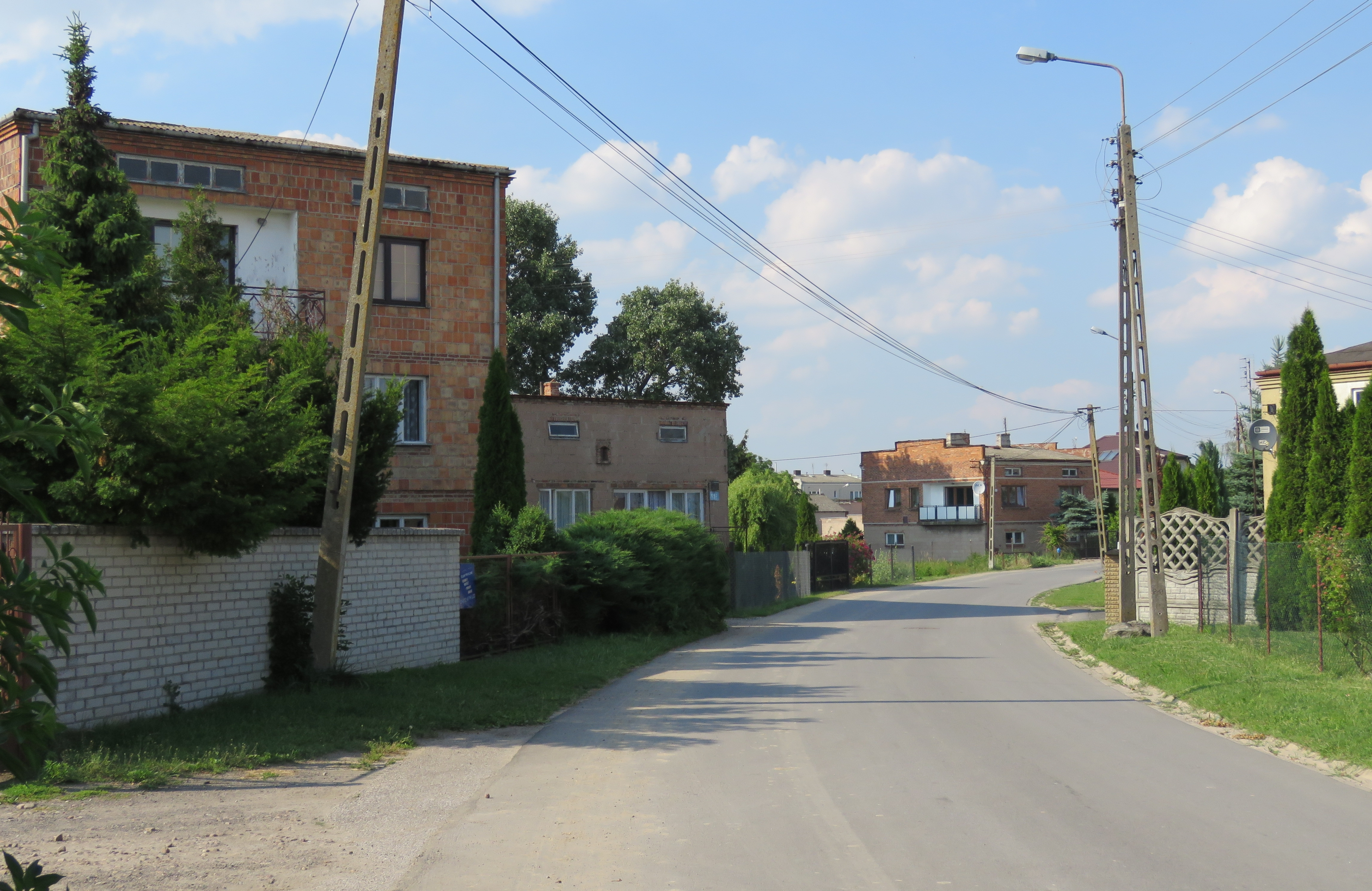

- Location within Poland
- Coordinates: 52°7′N 20°56′E
- Country: Poland
- Voivodeship: Masovian
- County: Piaseczno
- Gmina: Lesznowola
- Time zone: UTC+1 (CET)
  - Summer (DST): UTC+2 (CEST)
- Vehicle registration: WPI

Podolszyn [pɔˈdɔlʂɨn] is a village in the administrative district of Gmina Lesznowola, within Piaseczno County, Masovian Voivodeship, in east-central Poland.

== History ==
Two Polish citizens were murdered by Nazi Germany in the village during World War II.
