= Zamienie, Piaseczno County =

Zamienie
- Village
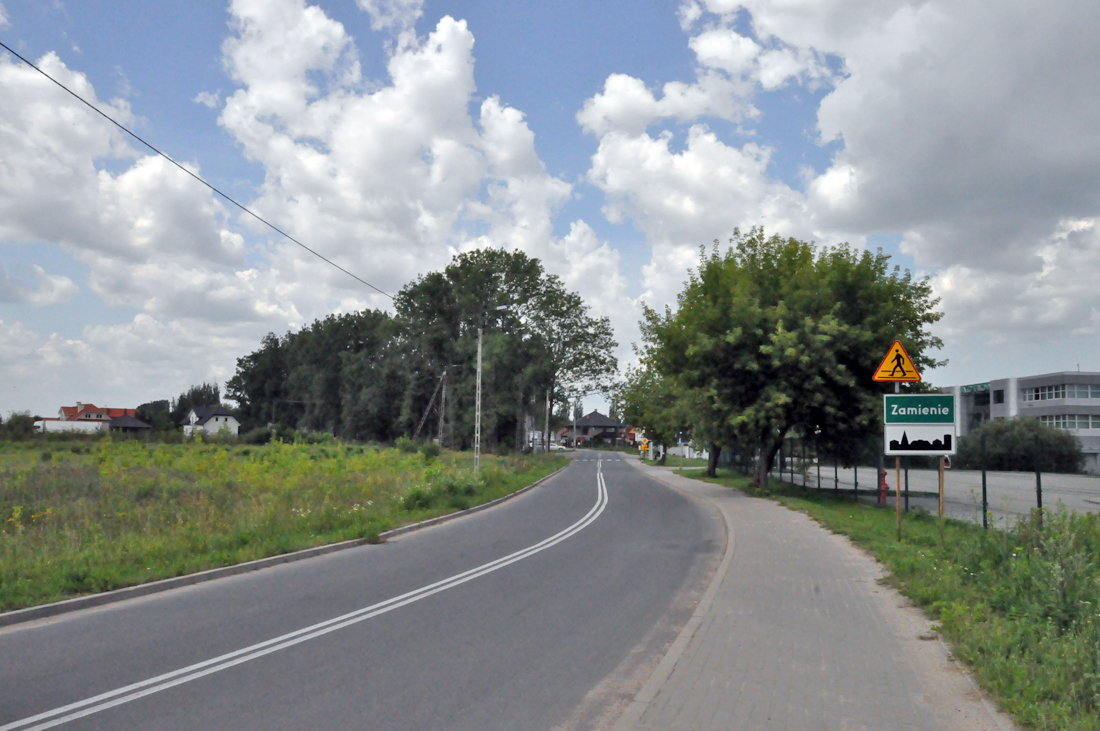
- Entrance to the village

- Location within Poland
- Coordinates: 52°06′51″N 20°58′38″E
- Country: Poland
- Voivodeship: Masovian
- County: Piaseczno
- Gmina: Lesznowola

Zamienie [zaˈmjɛɲɛ] is a village in the administrative district of Gmina Lesznowola, within Piaseczno County, Masovian Voivodeship, in east-central Poland.
