= Wólka Kosowska =

- Village
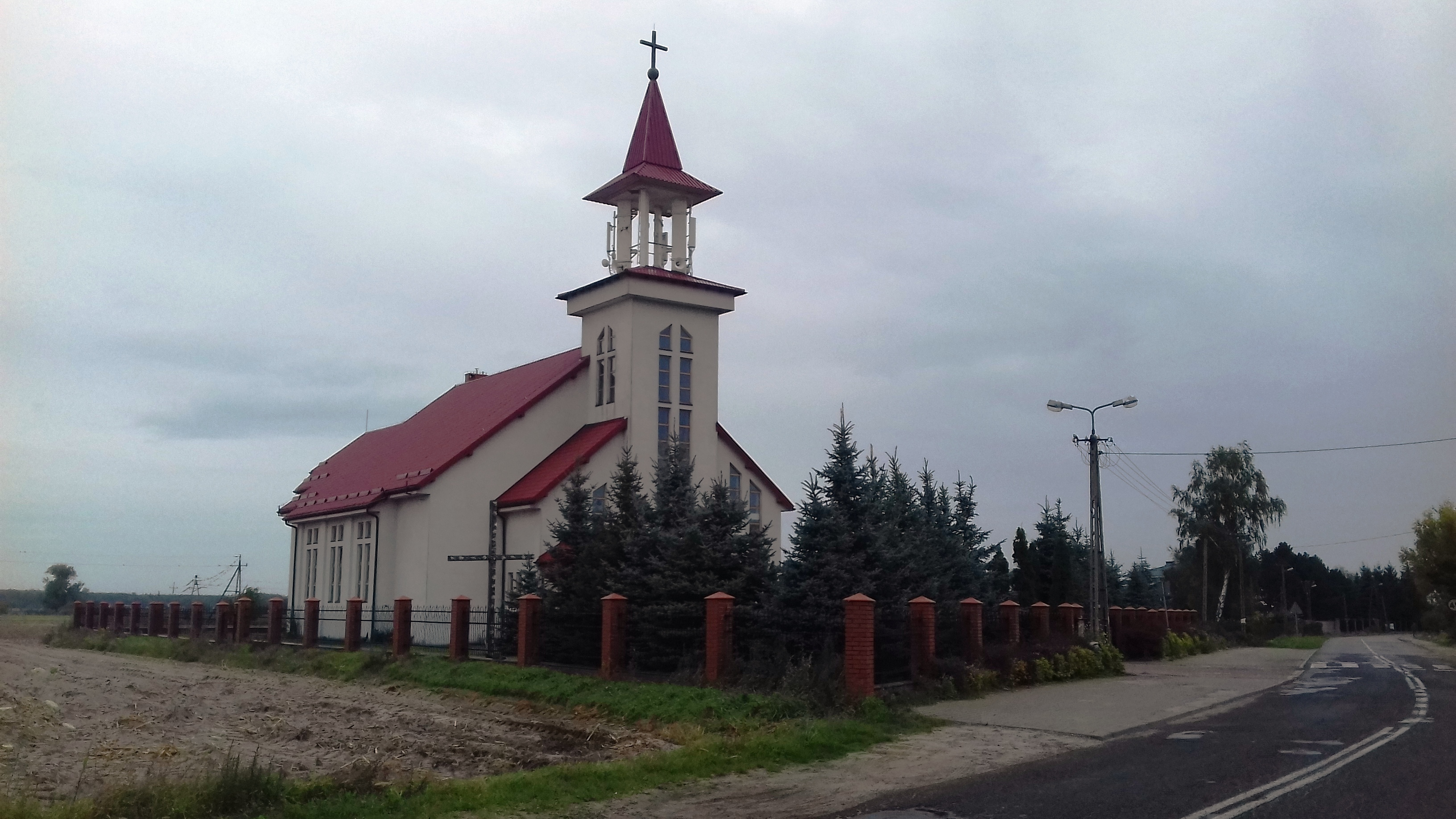
- Saint Francisco and Jacinta Marto church in Wólka Kosowska

- Location within Poland
- Coordinates: 52°3′26″N 20°50′32″E
- Country: Poland
- Voivodeship: Masovian
- County: Piaseczno
- Gmina: Lesznowola
- Time zone: UTC+1 (CET)
  - Summer (DST): UTC+2 (CEST)
- Vehicle registration: WPI

Wólka Kosowska [ˈvulka kɔˈsɔfska] is a village in the administrative district of Gmina Lesznowola, within Piaseczno County, Masovian Voivodeship, in east-central Poland.

== Economy ==
Wólka Kosowska has businesses run by Asian immigrants, mostly Chinese and Vietnamese, centred at a local shopping centre.

== History ==
In 1921, the village had a population of 248, entirely Polish by ethnicity.

In July 2022, September 2023, May 2024 and September 2024, there were single hall fires at the shopping center.

== Crime ==
On 14 March 2013, five men carried out an armed robbery of escorts transporting more than 4.2 million złotys to a local bank. The escorts were shot, and, according to a press release from the prosecutor's office, survived only thanks to bulletproof vests.

In 2017, the Polish Internal Security Agency and Border Guard cracked down on several illegal casinos likely run by an Asian criminal group.

On 12 August 2024, a shooting occurred in which a 42-year-old Lithuanian citizen was shot, and soon died. Police arrested a 37-year-old citizen of China suspected of murder.
