= Gmina Lesznowola =

Gmina Lesznowola Lesznowola Commune
- Gmina
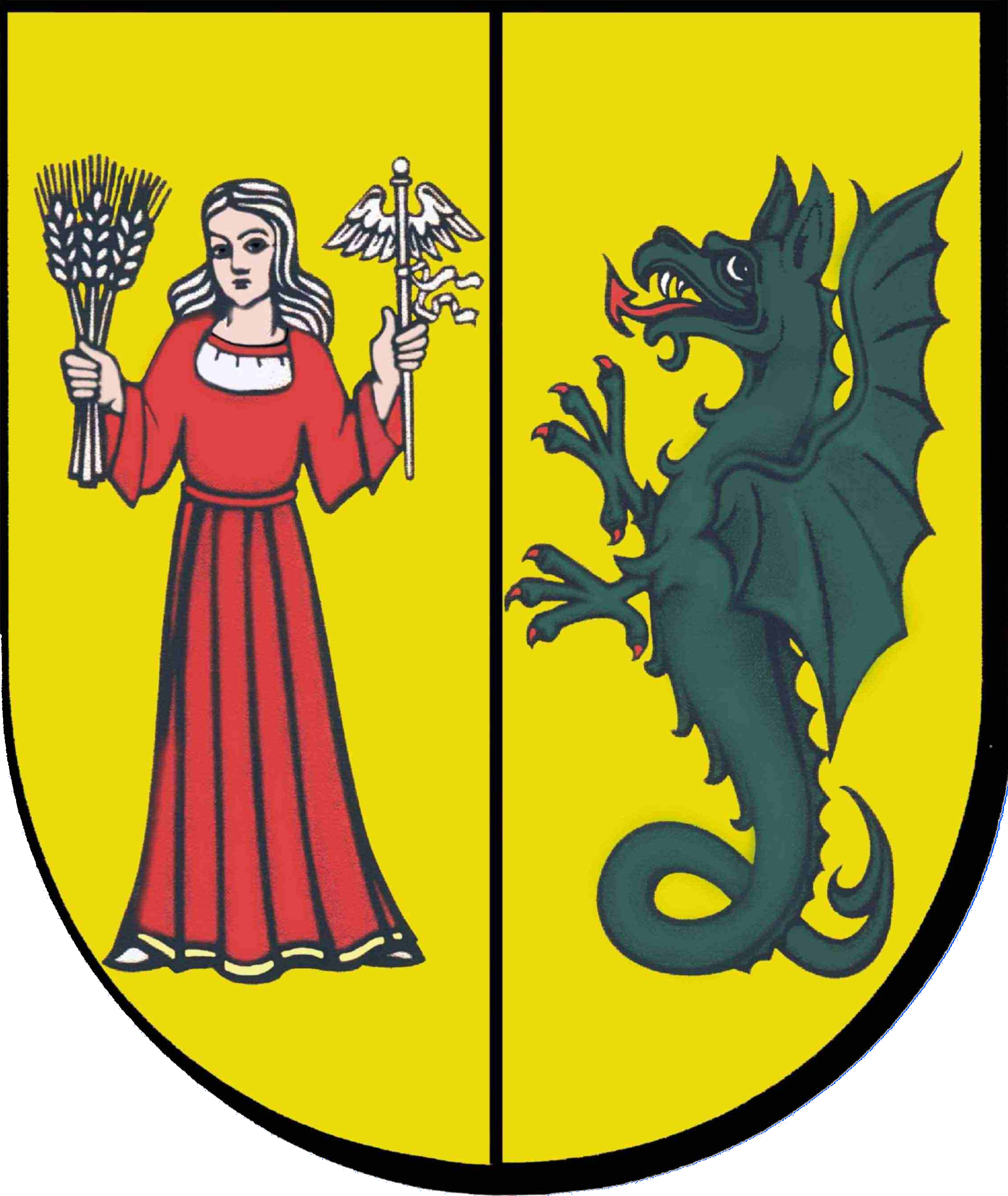
- Coat of arms
- Interactive map of Gmina Lesznowola
- Coordinates (Lesznowola): 52°5′16″N 20°56′17″E
- Country: Poland
- Voivodeship: Masovian
- County: Piaseczno
- Seat: Lesznowola

Area
  - Total: 69.17 km^{2} (26.71 sq mi)

Population (2006)
  - Total: 16,113
  - Density: 232.9/km^{2} (603.3/sq mi)
- Website: https://www.lesznowola.pl/

Gmina Lesznowola is a rural gmina (administrative district) in Piaseczno County, Masovian Voivodeship, in east-central Poland. Its seat is the village of Lesznowola, which lies approximately 6 kilometres (4 mi) north-west of Piaseczno and 15 km (9 mi) south of Warsaw.

The gmina covers an area of 69.17 square kilometres (26.7 sq mi), and as of 2006 its total population is 16,113.

== Villages ==
Gmina Lesznowola contains the villages and settlements of Garbatka, Jabłonowo, Janczewice, Jazgarzewszczyzna, Kolonia Lesznowola, Kolonia Mrokowska, Kosów, Łazy, Łazy Drugie, Leszczynka, Lesznowola, Łoziska, Magdalenka, Marysin, Mroków, Mysiadło, Nowa Iwiczna, Nowa Wola, Podolszyn, Stachowo, Stara Iwiczna, Stefanowo, Warszawianka, Wilcza Góra, Władysławów, Wola Mrokowska, Wólka Kosowska, Zamienie and Zgorzała.

== Neighbouring gminas ==
Gmina Lesznowola is bordered by the city of Warsaw and by the gminas of Nadarzyn, Piaseczno, Raszyn and Tarczyn.
