= Janczewice =

- Village
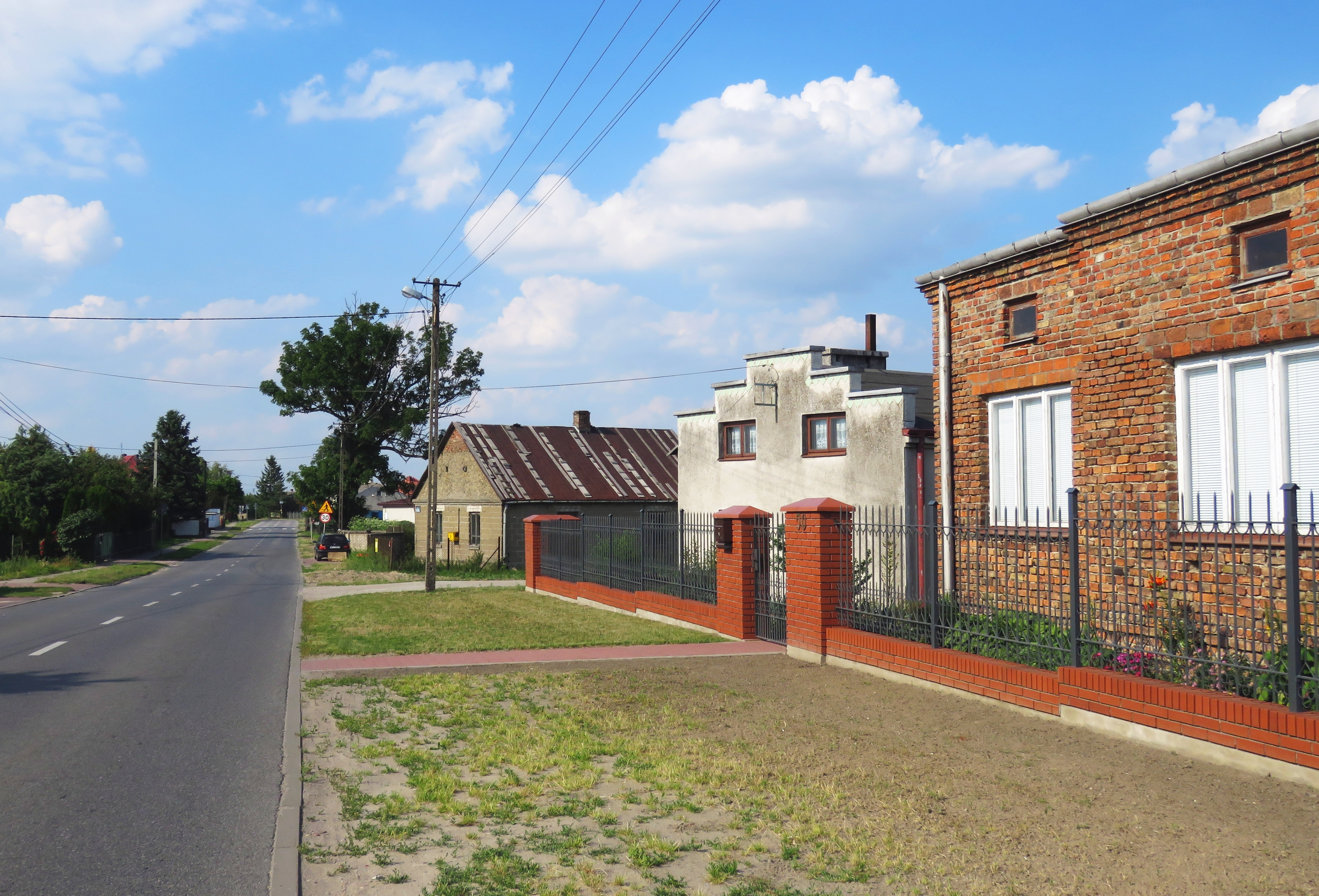

- Location within Poland
- Coordinates: 52°6′38″N 20°55′54″E
- Country: Poland
- Voivodeship: Masovian
- County: Piaseczno
- Gmina: Lesznowola

Janczewice [jant͡ʂɛˈvit͡sɛ] is a village in the administrative district of Gmina Lesznowola, within Piaseczno County, Masovian Voivodeship, in east-central Poland.
