= Jazgarzewszczyzna =

- Village
- Location within Poland
- Coordinates: 52°2′N 20°59′E
- Country: Poland
- Voivodeship: Masovian
- County: Piaseczno
- Gmina: Lesznowola

Jazgarzewszczyzna [jazɡaʐɛfʂˈt͡ʂɨzna] is a village in the administrative district of Gmina Lesznowola, within Piaseczno County, Masovian Voivodeship, in east-central Poland.
