= Wilcza Góra, Masovian Voivodeship =

Wilcza Góra
- Village
- Location within Poland
- Coordinates: 52°04′25″N 20°56′12″E
- Country: Poland
- Voivodeship: Masovian
- County: Piaseczno
- Gmina: Lesznowola

Wilcza Góra [ˈvilt͡ʂa ˈɡura] is a village in the administrative district of Gmina Lesznowola, within Piaseczno County, Masovian Voivodeship, in east-central Poland.
