= Leszczynka, Masovian Voivodeship =

Leszczynka
- Village
- Location within Poland
- Coordinates: 52°02′23″N 20°53′04″E
- Country: Poland
- Voivodeship: Masovian
- County: Piaseczno
- Gmina: Lesznowola

Leszczynka [lɛʂˈt͡ʂɨnka] is a village in the administrative district of Gmina Lesznowola, within Piaseczno County, Masovian Voivodeship, in east-central Poland.
