= Stachowo, Piaseczno County =

Stachowo
- Village
- Location within Poland
- Coordinates: 52°2′36″N 20°50′40″E
- Country: Poland
- Voivodeship: Masovian
- County: Piaseczno
- Gmina: Lesznowola
- Population: 93

Stachowo [staˈxɔvɔ] is a village in the administrative district of Gmina Lesznowola, within Piaseczno County, Masovian Voivodeship, in east-central Poland.
