= Magdalenka, Masovian Voivodeship =

Magdalenka
- Village
- Public library, 2016

- Location within Poland
- Coordinates: 52°5′48″N 20°54′33″E
- Country: Poland
- Voivodeship: Masovian
- County: Piaseczno
- Gmina: Lesznowola
- Population: 1,136

Magdalenka [maɡdaˈlɛnka] is a village in the administrative district of Gmina Lesznowola, within Piaseczno County, Masovian Voivodeship, in east-central Poland.

== History ==
In its present form, Magdalenka was largely established in the early 1930s, following the actions of a local landowner, Piotr Dmowski, who decided to systematically subdivide his vast estate with the aim of creating a residential settlement. Subsequently, the area became popular with holidaymakers, who usually resided in Warsaw. Several political leaders of the Polish People's Republic erected their summer houses in Magdalenka during the 1970s.

Magdalenka is the site of a former government complex where, in the period leading up to the Round Table Talks (1989), negotiations took place between the Communist government, hosted by Czesław Kiszczak, and the trade union Solidarity, led by Lech Wałęsa.

Magdalenka was the site of a bloody conflict between Polish Special Forces, BOA, and two heavily armed mafia combatants in 2003. It resulted in two police officers being killed and seventeen wounded. The mafia combatants used homemade mines and explosives, while they also had at least twenty eight weapons - from handguns to rifles.

== Notable people ==
The American actor Stacy Keach (1941–2026) lived in the village.
