= Kosów, Piaseczno County =

Kosów
- Village
- Location within Poland
- Coordinates: 52°02′48″N 20°49′36″E
- Country: Poland
- Voivodeship: Masovian
- County: Piaseczno
- Gmina: Lesznowola
- Population: 250

Kosów [ˈkɔsuf] is a village in the administrative district of Gmina Lesznowola, within Piaseczno County, Masovian Voivodeship, in east-central Poland.
