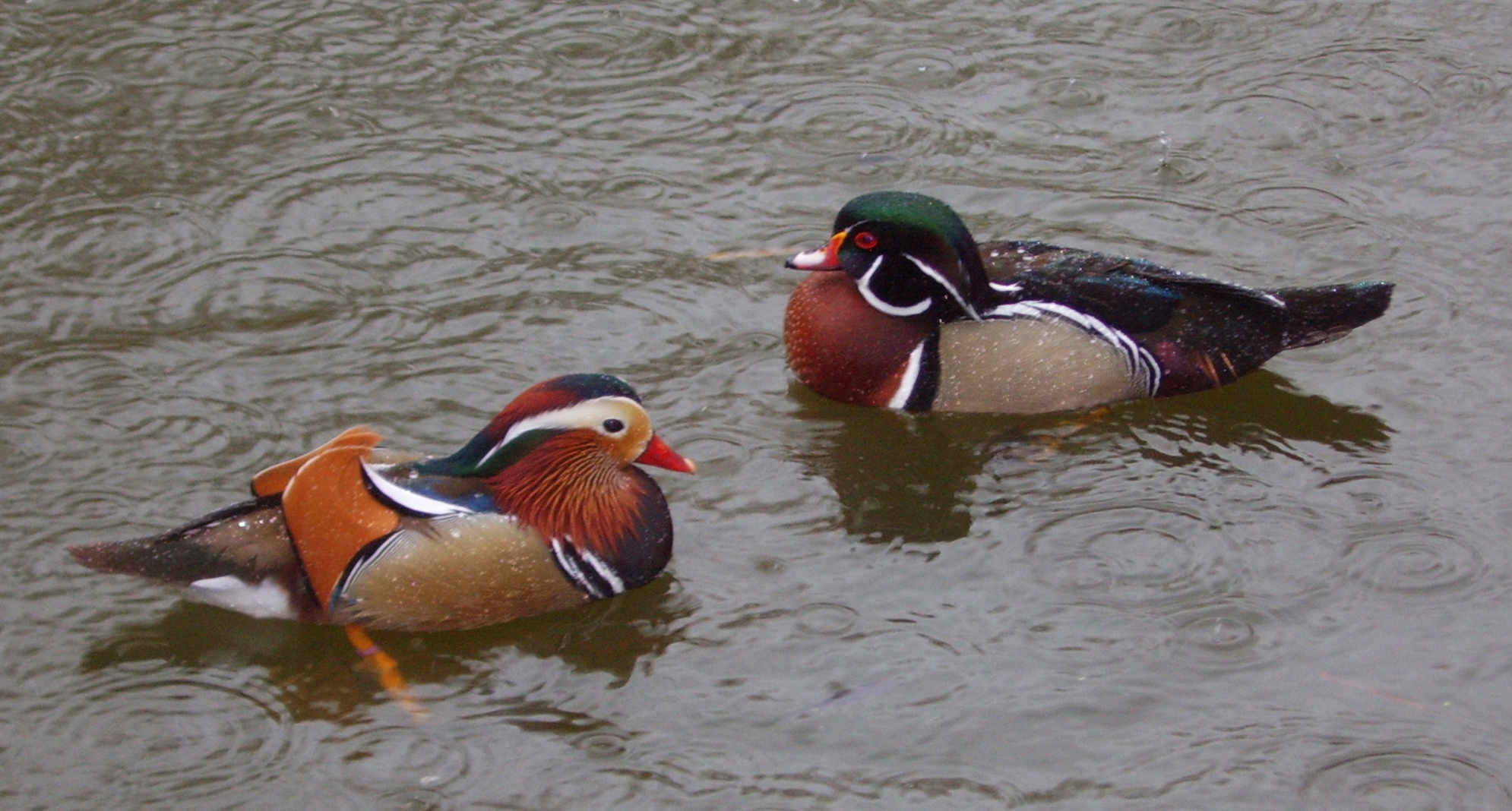
- Male mandarin duck (A. galericulata), left, and male wood duck (A. sponsa), right

Scientific classification
- Kingdom: Animalia
- Phylum: Chordata
- Class: Aves
- Order: Anseriformes
- Family: Anatidae
- Subfamily: Anatinae
- Genus: Aix; F. Boie, 1828

Type species
- Anas sponsa Linnaeus, 1758

Species
- A. galericulata; A. sponsa

= Aix (bird) =

Genus of birds

Aix is a bird genus that contains two species of ducks: the wood duck (Aix sponsa), and the mandarin duck (Aix galericulata). Aix (αἴξ, genitive αἰγός) is an Ancient Greek word used by Aristotle to refer to an unknown diving bird.

== Taxonomy ==
The genus belongs to the family Anatidae in the waterfowl order Anseriformes. They were formerly placed in the "perching ducks", a paraphyletic group somewhat intermediate between shelducks and dabbling ducks, and it is not quite clear whether they should be placed in the Anatinae (dabbling duck) or Tadorninae (shelduck) subfamily.

== Extant species ==
Genus Aix – F. Boie, 1828 – two species
Common name	Scientific name and subspecies	Range	Size and ecology	IUCN status and estimated population
Wood duck	Aix sponsa (Linnaeus, 1758)	North American species, eastern half of the United States, and from southern Canada to northern Mexico	Size: The wood duck has a mass of 500–700 grams (18–25 oz). It is 41–49 centimeters (16–19 in) in length, and has a wingspan of 73–75 cm (29–30 in). Males have red eyes and iridescent plumage. Both sexes have crested heads. Habitat: Diet:	LC
Mandarin duck	Aix galericulata (Linnaeus, 1758)	Asian species occurring mainly in Japan and China; introduced populations can be found in the United Kingdom, Western Europe and isolated areas of North America	Size: The Mandarin duck is 41–49 cm (16–19 in) long with a 65–75 cm (26–30 in) wingspan. It has an even more flamboyant plumage than the wood duck. The female Mandarins are less brightly colored than the males. Habitat: Diet:	LC

== Habitat ==
Both species migrate from the northern parts of their respective ranges to winter in the south of the range. They inhabit quiet wooded streams and ponds.

== Description ==
The two species are generally considered to be very attractive, particularly the multi-coloured drakes. The genus shows marked sexual dimorphism (differences between the sexes), with the females being smaller and predominantly brown in colour. In both species, the males undergo an annual moult into eclipse plumage, during which time their feathers are temporarily replaced with less colourful ones.

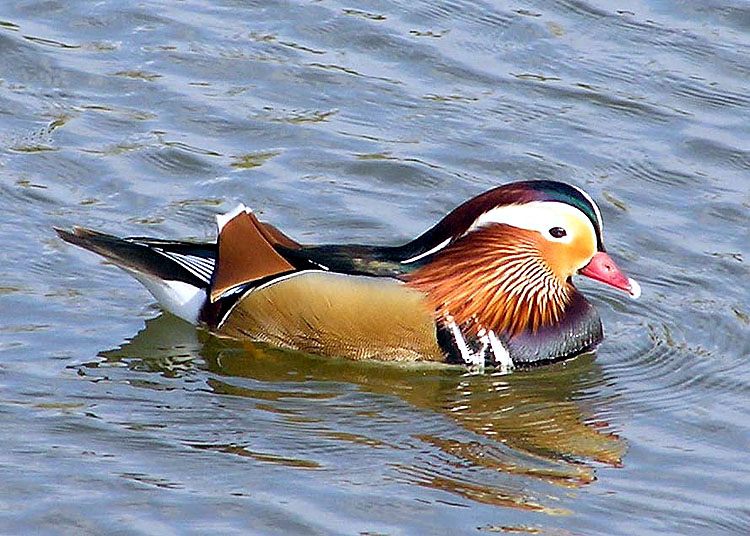
Mandarin duck (Aix galericulata)

== Diet ==
Wood ducks will consume small crustaceans, insects, and plant matter. Mandarin ducks are mainly vegetarian.

== Breeding ==
Wood ducks are reproductively capable around the age of one year. They are monogamous for the season. Mating occurs between February and April, depending on latitude. The clutch size is between 6 and 15, and the incubation period is about 30 days. The young are precocial. They venture from the cavity nest at one day old and are cared for by the mother for about 60 days. The young have a very high mortality rate. Wood ducks normally live 3 to 4 years.

Mandarin ducks are also monogamous. The courtship ritual, like the plumage, is rather showy. The female lays between 9 and 12 eggs in a cavity nest, then incubates them for about 30 days. Parental care by the mother is a little shorter in this species, lasting about 40 days.

== Conservation ==
Both species are affected by loss of habitat. As human development continues to expand, the woodland areas preferred by these ducks continues to shrink. As of 2016, both species had been evaluated for the Red List of the International Union for Conservation of Nature (IUCN), and given a "least concern" rating.
