= Władysławów, Piaseczno County =

Władysławów
- Village
- Location within Poland
- Coordinates: 52°4′N 20°56′E
- Country: Poland
- Voivodeship: Masovian
- County: Piaseczno
- Gmina: Lesznowola

Władysławów [vwadɨˈswavuf] is a village in the administrative district of Gmina Lesznowola, within Piaseczno County, Masovian Voivodeship, in east-central Poland.
