= Lesznowola, Piaseczno County =

Lesznowola
- Village
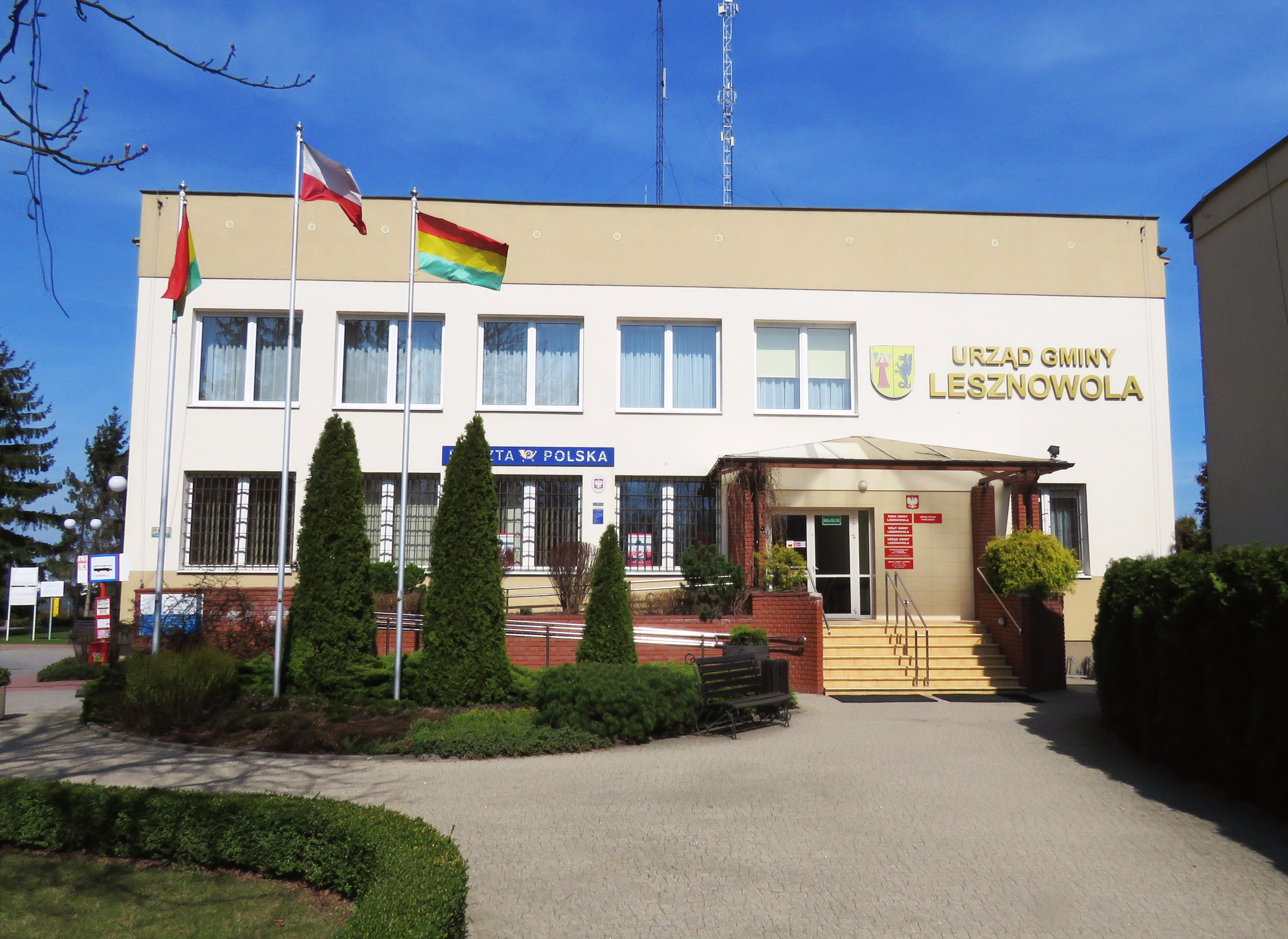
- Gmina office and post office in Lesznowola

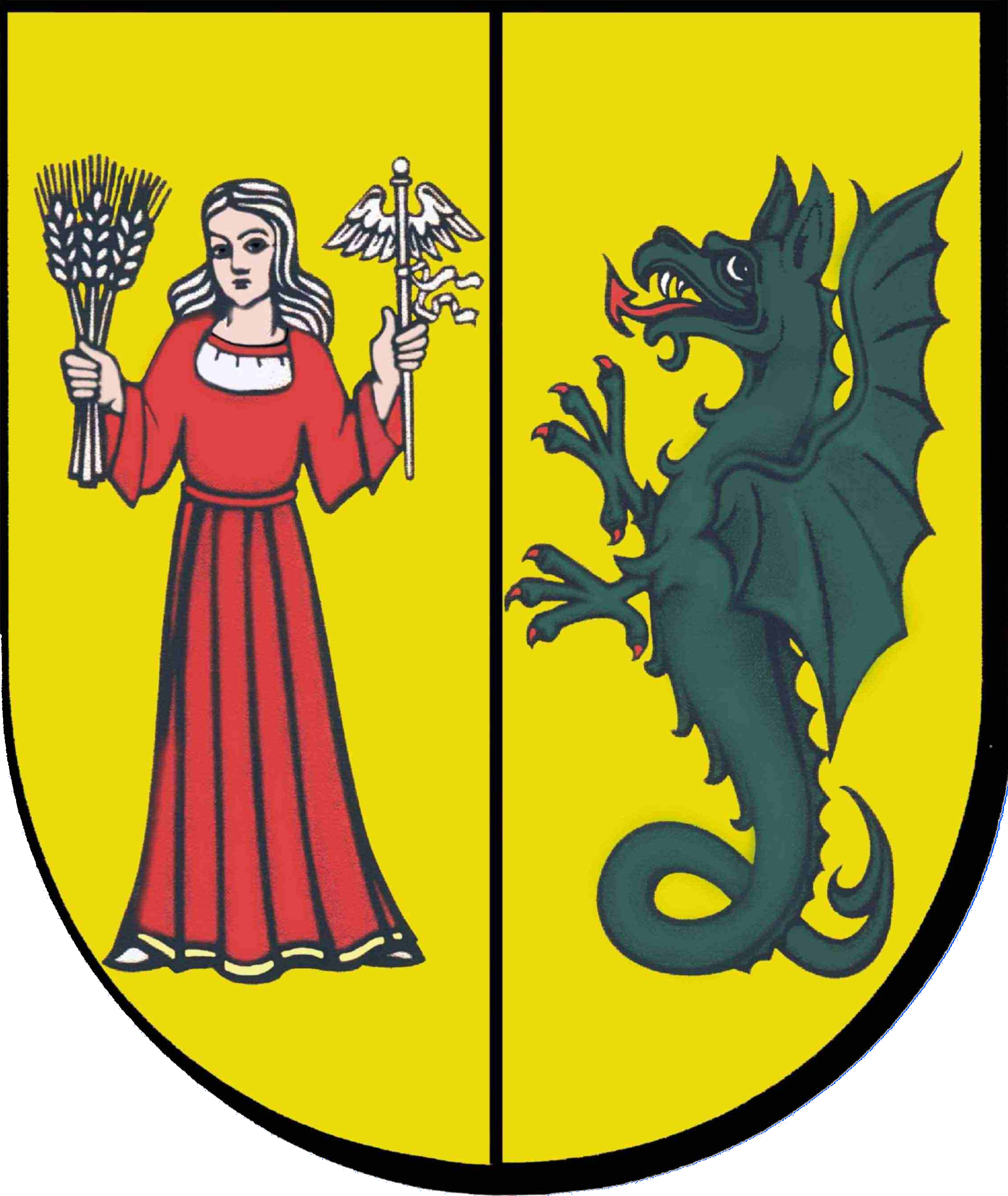
- Coat of arms

- Location within Poland
- Coordinates: 52°5′16″N 20°56′17″E
- Country: Poland
- Voivodeship: Masovian
- County: Piaseczno
- Gmina: Lesznowola

Population
  - Total: 400
- Time zone: UTC+1 (CET)
  - Summer (DST): UTC+2 (CEST)
- Vehicle registration: WPI
- Website: http://www.lesznowola.waw.pl/

Lesznowola [lɛʂnɔˈvɔla] is a village in Piaseczno County, Masovian Voivodeship, in east-central Poland. It is the seat of the gmina (administrative district) called Gmina Lesznowola.
