= Łoziska =

- Village
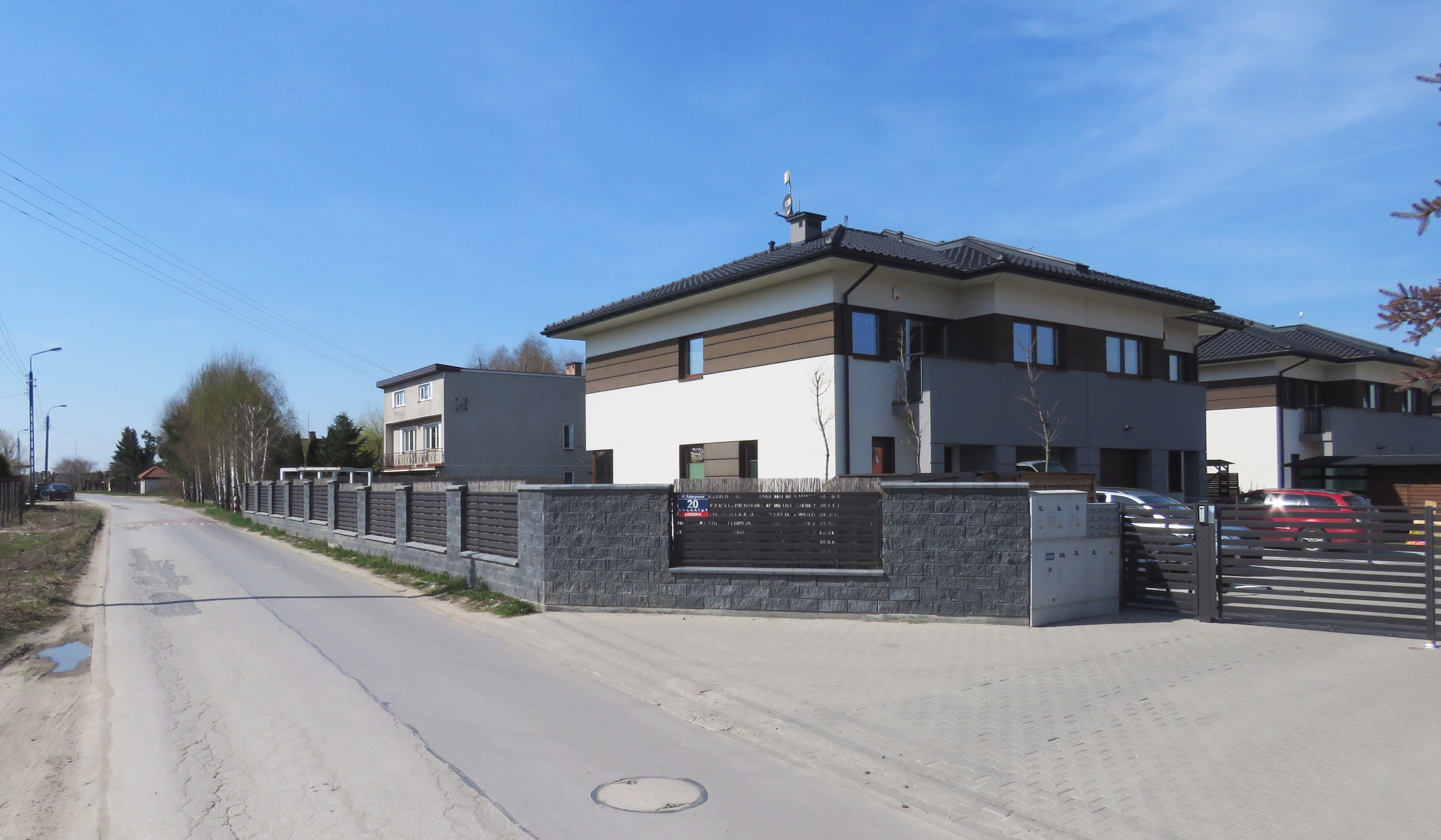

- Location within Poland
- Coordinates: 52°04′39″N 20°59′20″E
- Country: Poland
- Voivodeship: Masovian
- County: Piaseczno
- Gmina: Lesznowola

Łoziska [wɔˈʑiska] is a village in the administrative district of Gmina Lesznowola, within Piaseczno County, Masovian Voivodeship, in east-central Poland.
