= Wola Mrokowska =

- Village
- Location within Poland
- Coordinates: 52°2′N 20°51′E
- Country: Poland
- Voivodeship: Masovian
- County: Piaseczno
- Gmina: Lesznowola

Wola Mrokowska [ˈvɔla mrɔˈkɔfska] is a village in the administrative district of Gmina Lesznowola, within Piaseczno County, Masovian Voivodeship, in east-central Poland.
