= Kolonia Lesznowola =

- Settlement
- Location within Poland
- Coordinates: 52°4′50″N 20°58′23″E
- Country: Poland
- Voivodeship: Masovian
- County: Piaseczno
- Gmina: Lesznowola

Kolonia Lesznowola [kɔˈlɔɲa lɛʂnɔˈvɔla] is a settlement in the administrative district of Gmina Lesznowola, within Piaseczno County, Masovian Voivodeship, in east-central Poland.
