= Warszawianka, Masovian Voivodeship =

Warszawianka
- Village
- Location within Poland
- Coordinates: 52°01′55″N 20°52′14″E
- Country: Poland
- Voivodeship: Masovian
- County: Piaseczno
- Gmina: Lesznowola

Warszawianka [varʂaˈvjaŋka] is a village in the administrative district of Gmina Lesznowola, within Piaseczno County, Masovian Voivodeship, in east-central Poland.
