= Jabłonowo, Masovian Voivodeship =

Jabłonowo
- Village
- Location within Poland
- Coordinates: 52°3′23″N 20°51′49″E
- Country: Poland
- Voivodeship: Masovian
- County: Piaseczno
- Gmina: Lesznowola

Jabłonowo [jabwɔˈnɔvɔ] is a village in the administrative district of Gmina Lesznowola, within Piaseczno County, Masovian Voivodeship, in east-central Poland.
