= Stefanowo, Masovian Voivodeship =

Stefanowo
- Village
- Location within Poland
- Coordinates: 52°2′50″N 20°52′58″E
- Country: Poland
- Voivodeship: Masovian
- County: Piaseczno
- Gmina: Lesznowola
- Population: 500 (2,011)

Stefanowo [stɛfaˈnɔvɔ] is a village in the administrative district of Gmina Lesznowola, within Piaseczno County, Masovian Voivodeship, in east-central Poland.

In 1975–1998, the village belonged to the Warsaw province.
