= Zgorzała =

- Village
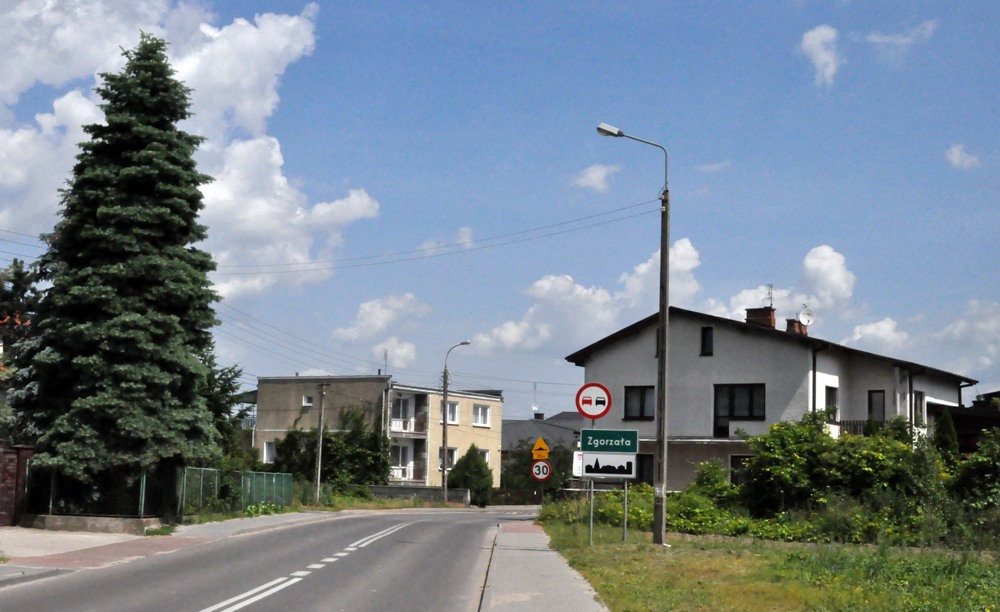

- Location within Poland
- Coordinates: 52°6′N 20°58′E
- Country: Poland
- Voivodeship: Masovian
- County: Piaseczno
- Gmina: Lesznowola
- Time zone: UTC+1 (CET)
  - Summer (DST): UTC+2 (CEST)
- Vehicle registration: WPI

Zgorzała (Polish pronunciation: [zɡɔˈʐawa]) is a village in the administrative district of Gmina Lesznowola, within Piaseczno County, Masovian Voivodeship, in the Warsaw metropolitan area, in east-central Poland.
