= Stara Iwiczna =

- Village
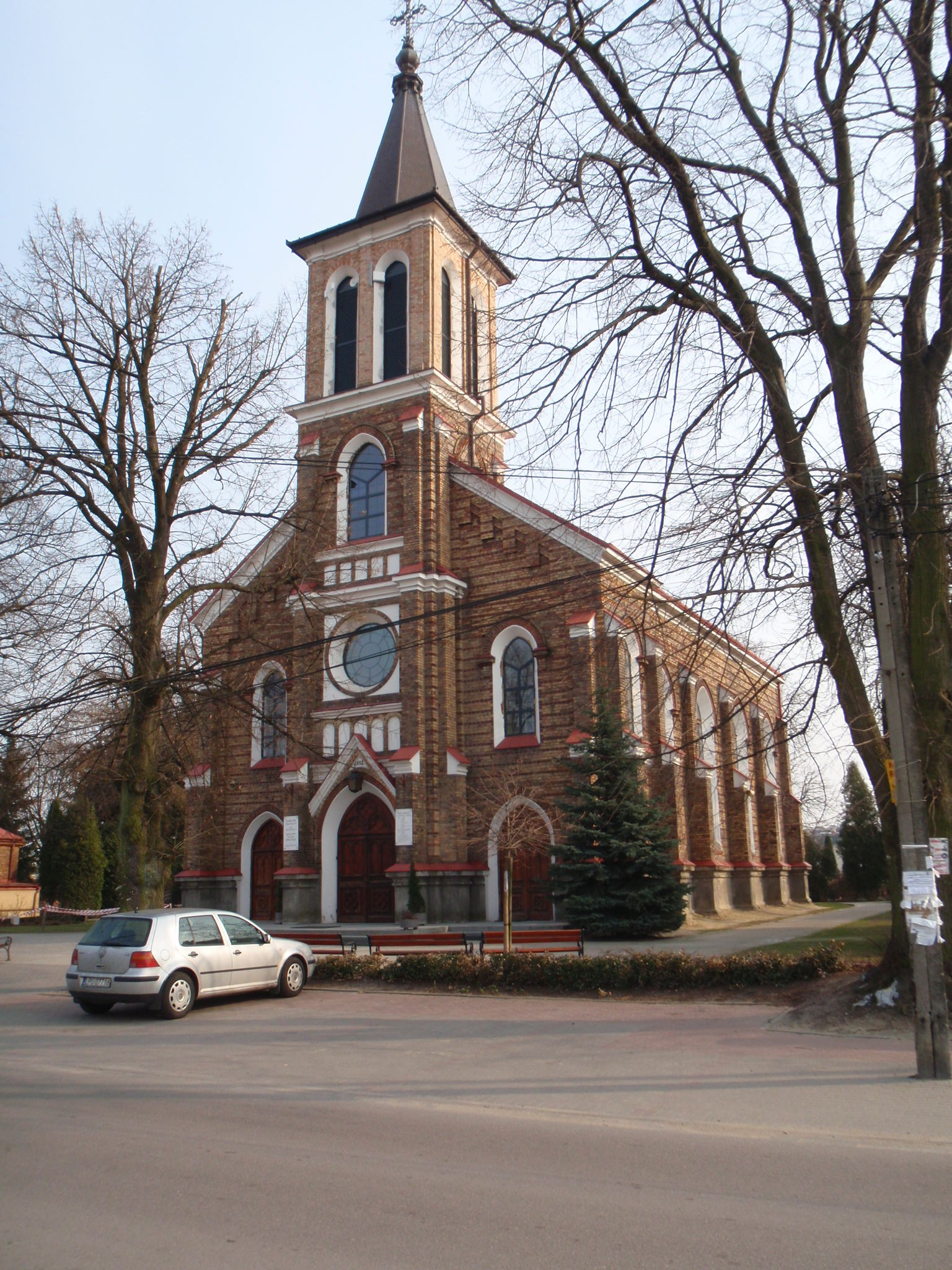
- Church

- Location within Poland
- Coordinates: 52°5′N 20°59′E
- Country: Poland
- Voivodeship: Masovian
- County: Piaseczno
- Gmina: Lesznowola

Stara Iwiczna [ˈstara iˈvit͡ʂna] is a village in the administrative district of Gmina Lesznowola, within Piaseczno County, Masovian Voivodeship, in east-central Poland.
