= Ostrowik =

Ostrowik may refer to the following places:

- Ostrowik, Podlaskie Voivodeship (north-east Poland)
- Ostrowik, Otwock County in Masovian Voivodeship (east-central Poland)
- Ostrowik, Wołomin County in Masovian Voivodeship (east-central Poland)
- Ostrówik, Masovian Voivodeship (east-central Poland)
