= Pęcław =

Pęcław may refer to the following places in Poland:

- Pęcław, Lower Silesian Voivodeship (south-west Poland)
- Pęcław, Masovian Voivodeship (east-central Poland)
