= Halina Łukomska =

Polish soprano (1929–2016)

Halina Łukomska (29 April 1929 – 30 August 2016) was a Polish soprano. She was born in Suchedniów, Poland on 29 April 1929. Łukomska was married to composer Augustyn Bloch. She died in Kąty, near Warsaw, on 30 August 2016, at the age of 87.

== Selected premieres ==
- Dimitri Terzakis:
  - Sappho-Fragmente (1977), premiered on 17 April 1980
  - Erotikon (1979), premiered on 19 April 1980 by Wittener Tage für neue Kammermusik, Halina Lukomska (sopr.), Spiros Argiris (conductor)

== Selected recordings ==
- Pli selon pli (1969, Boulez, composer and conductor).
- Anton Webern: opp. 1–31 (soprano in most of the vocal works, along with Heather Harper.) (recordings made 1969-70, now reissued on Sony Classical.)
- Alban Berg: Three Pieces for Orchestra; Chamber Concerto; Altenburg Lieder op. 4. (Released in 1968.)
- George Frideric Handel: Silete venti (on Harmonia Mundi, 1962)
- Karol Szymanowski: a collection of songs. (issued on CD in 1990)
- Johann Christian Bach: Confitebor tibi Domine, cantata for solo, choir, and orchestra (1759) (Harmonia Mundi LP, 1973)
- Witold Lutosławski: collected edition on EMI CD, including five songs. (EMI, 2004).

== Sources ==
- "Halina Łukomska" (in Polish). Polish Composers' Union. 2003.
