= Tomice =

Tomice may refer to places:

== Czech Republic ==
- Tomice (Benešov District), a municipality and village
- Tomice II, a village and administrative part of Olbramovice

== Poland ==
- Tomice, Wrocław County in Lower Silesian Voivodeship (south-west Poland)
- Tomice, Ząbkowice County in Lower Silesian Voivodeship (south-west Poland)
- Tomice, Lesser Poland Voivodeship (south Poland)
- Tomice, Masovian Voivodeship (east-central Poland)
- Tomice, Pleszew County in Greater Poland Voivodeship (west-central Poland)
- Tomice, Poznań County in Greater Poland Voivodeship (west-central Poland)
- Tomice, Opole Voivodeship (south-west Poland)
