= Krzaki Czaplinkowskie =

- Village
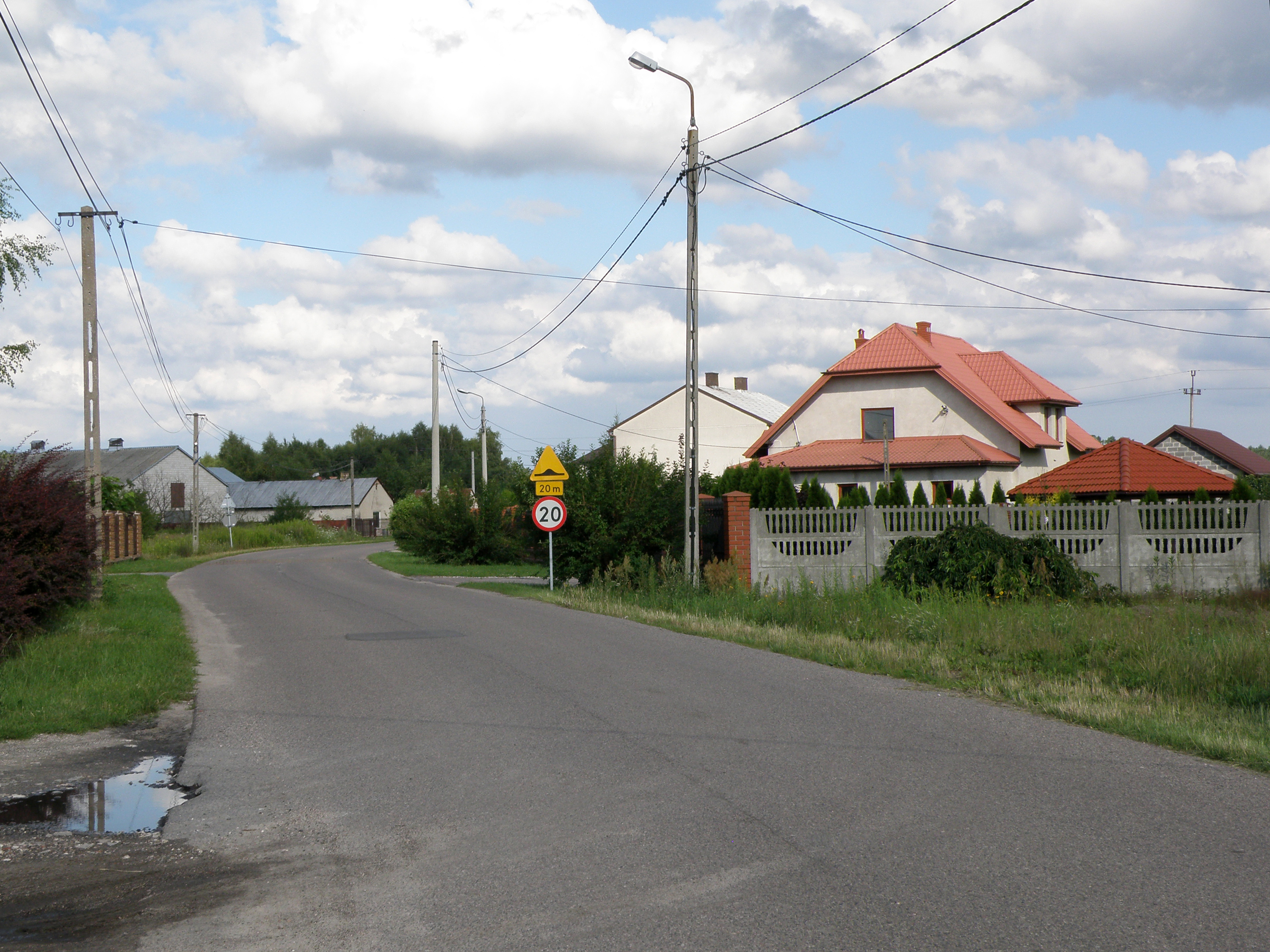
- Street in Krzaki Czaplinkowskie

- Location within Poland
- Coordinates: 51°58′40″N 21°09′49″E
- Country: Poland
- Voivodeship: Masovian
- County: Piaseczno
- Gmina: Góra Kalwaria

Krzaki Czaplinkowskie [ˈkʂaki t͡ʂaplinˈkɔfskʲɛ] is a village in the administrative district of Gmina Góra Kalwaria, within Piaseczno County, Masovian Voivodeship, in east-central Poland.
