= Podgóra, Piaseczno County =

Podgóra
- Village
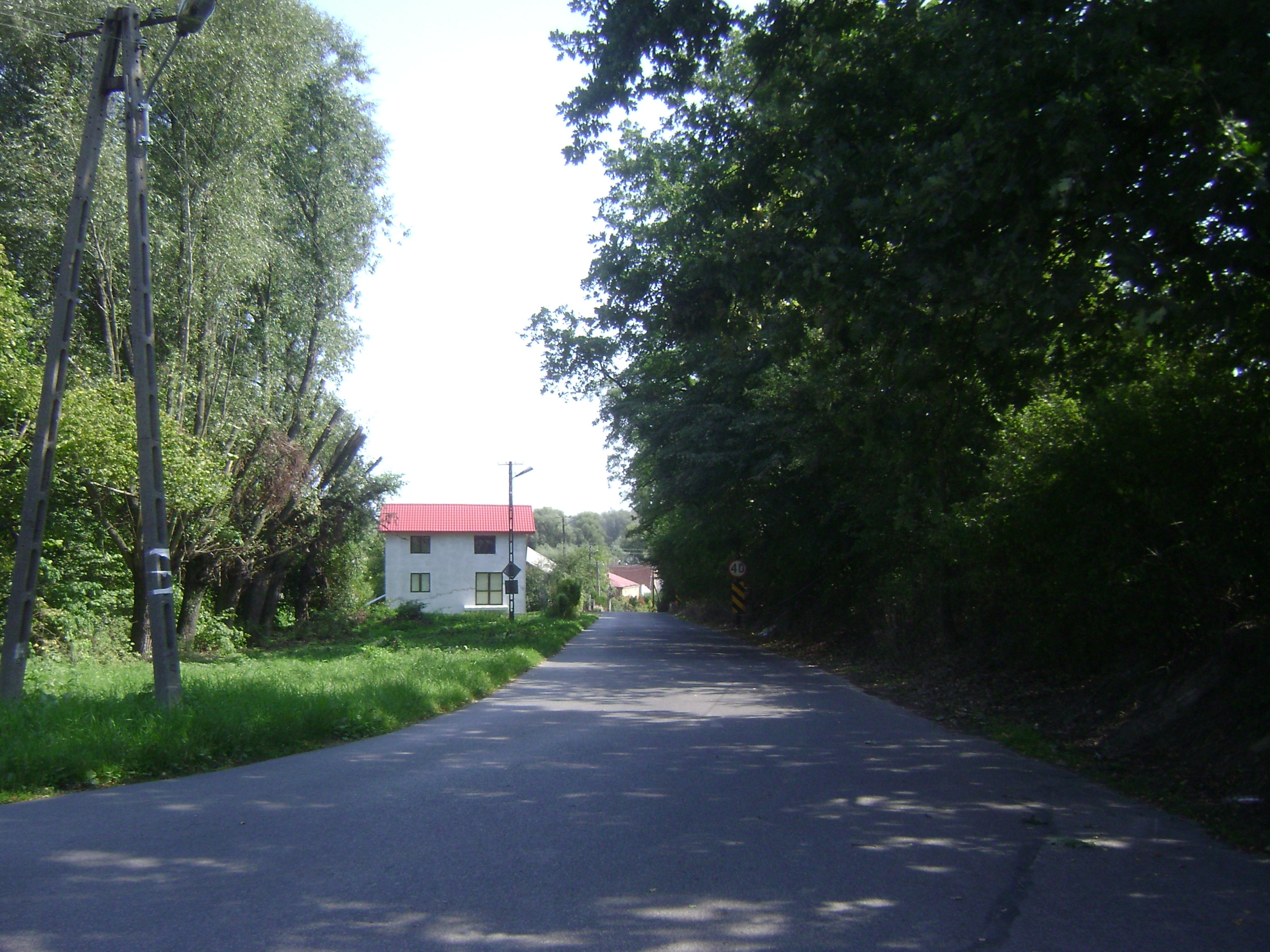

- Location within Poland
- Coordinates: 51°55′22″N 21°13′54″E
- Country: Poland
- Voivodeship: Masovian
- County: Piaseczno
- Gmina: Góra Kalwaria

Podgóra [pɔdˈɡura] is a village in the administrative district of Gmina Góra Kalwaria, within Piaseczno County, Masovian Voivodeship, in east-central Poland.
