= Czaplinek, Masovian Voivodeship =

Czaplinek
- Village
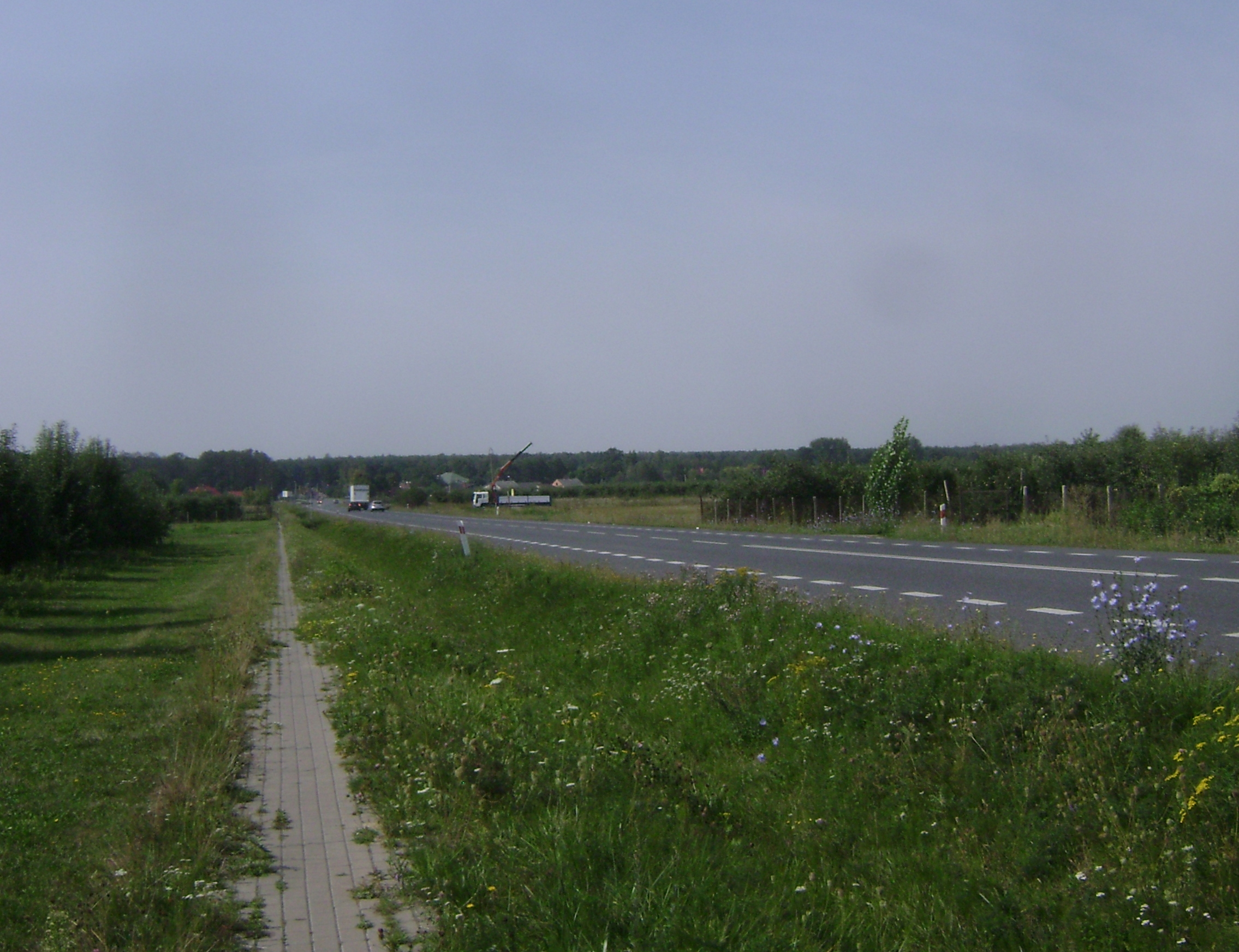

- Location within Poland
- Coordinates: 51°56′56″N 21°8′15″E
- Country: Poland
- Voivodeship: Masovian
- County: Piaseczno
- Gmina: Góra Kalwaria

Czaplinek [t͡ʂaˈplinɛk] is a village in the administrative district of Gmina Góra Kalwaria, within Piaseczno County, Masovian Voivodeship, in east-central Poland.
