= Obręb, Piaseczno County =

Obręb
- Village
- Location within Poland
- Coordinates: 51°57′12″N 21°6′57″E
- Country: Poland
- Voivodeship: Masovian
- County: Piaseczno
- Gmina: Góra Kalwaria

Obręb [ˈɔbrɛmp] is a village in the administrative district of Gmina Góra Kalwaria, within Piaseczno County, Masovian Voivodeship, in east-central Poland.
