= Wojciechowice, Masovian Voivodeship =

Wojciechowice
- Village
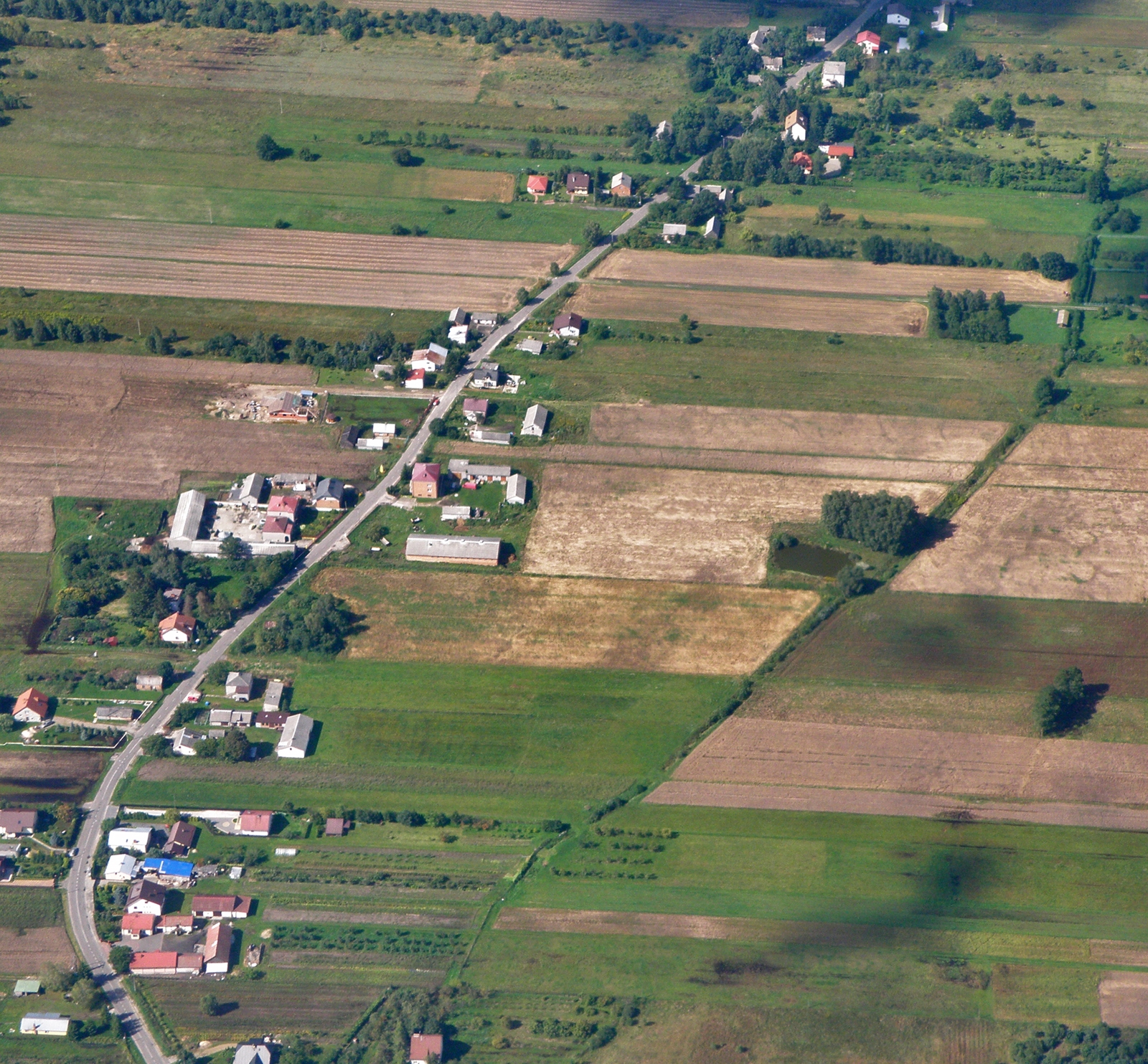
- Wojciechowice

- Location within Poland
- Coordinates: 51°59′59″N 21°05′28″E
- Country: Poland
- Voivodeship: Masovian
- County: Piaseczno
- Gmina: Góra Kalwaria

Wojciechowice (Polish pronunciation: [vɔjt͡ɕɛxɔˈvit͡sɛ]) is a village in the administrative district of Gmina Góra Kalwaria, within Piaseczno County, Masovian Voivodeship, in east-central Poland.
