= Buczynów =

- Village
- Location within Poland
- Coordinates: 51°56′57″N 21°10′32″E
- Country: Poland
- Voivodeship: Masovian
- County: Piaseczno
- Gmina: Góra Kalwaria

Buczynów [buˈt͡ʂɨnuf] is a village in the administrative district of Gmina Góra Kalwaria, within Piaseczno County, Masovian Voivodeship, in east-central Poland.
