= Gmina Góra Kalwaria =

Gmina Góra Kalwaria Góra Kalwaria Commune
- Gmina
- Flag Coat of arms
- Interactive map of Gmina Góra Kalwaria
- Coordinates (Góra Kalwaria): 51°58′24″N 21°12′52″E
- Country: Poland
- Voivodeship: Masovian
- County: Piaseczno
- Seat: Góra Kalwaria

Area
  - Total: 142.95 km^{2} (55.19 sq mi)

Population (2006)
  - Total: 24,035
  - Density: 168.14/km^{2} (435.47/sq mi)
  - Urban: 11,130
  - Rural: 12,905
- Website: http://www.gorakalwaria.pl

Gmina Góra Kalwaria is an urban-rural gmina (administrative district) in Piaseczno County, Masovian Voivodeship, in east-central Poland. Its seat is the town of Góra Kalwaria, which lies approximately 18 kilometres (11 mi) south-east of Piaseczno and 31 km (19 mi) south-east of Warsaw.

The gmina covers an area of 145.11 square kilometres (56.0 sq mi), and as of 2006 its total population is 24,035 (out of which the population of Góra Kalwaria amounts to 11,130, and the population of the rural part of the gmina is 12,905).

== Villages ==
Apart from the town of Góra Kalwaria, Gmina Góra Kalwaria contains the villages and settlements of Aleksandrów, Baniocha, Borki, Brześce, Brzumin, Buczynów, Cendrowice, Coniew, Czachówek, Czaplin, Czaplinek, Czarny Las, Czersk, Dębówka, Dobiesz, Julianów, Karolina, Kąty, Kępa Radwankowska, Królewski Las, Krzaki Czaplinkowskie, Linin, Łubna, Ługówka, Mikówiec, Moczydłów, Obręb, Ostrówik, Pęcław, Podgóra, Podłęcze, Podosowa, Potycz, Sierzchów, Sobików, Solec, Szymanów, Tomice, Wincentów, Wojciechowice, Wólka Dworska and Wólka Załęska.

== Neighbouring gminas ==
Gmina Góra Kalwaria is bordered by the gminas of Chynów, Karczew, Konstancin-Jeziorna, Piaseczno, Prażmów, Sobienie-Jeziory and Warka.
