= Brzumin =

- Village
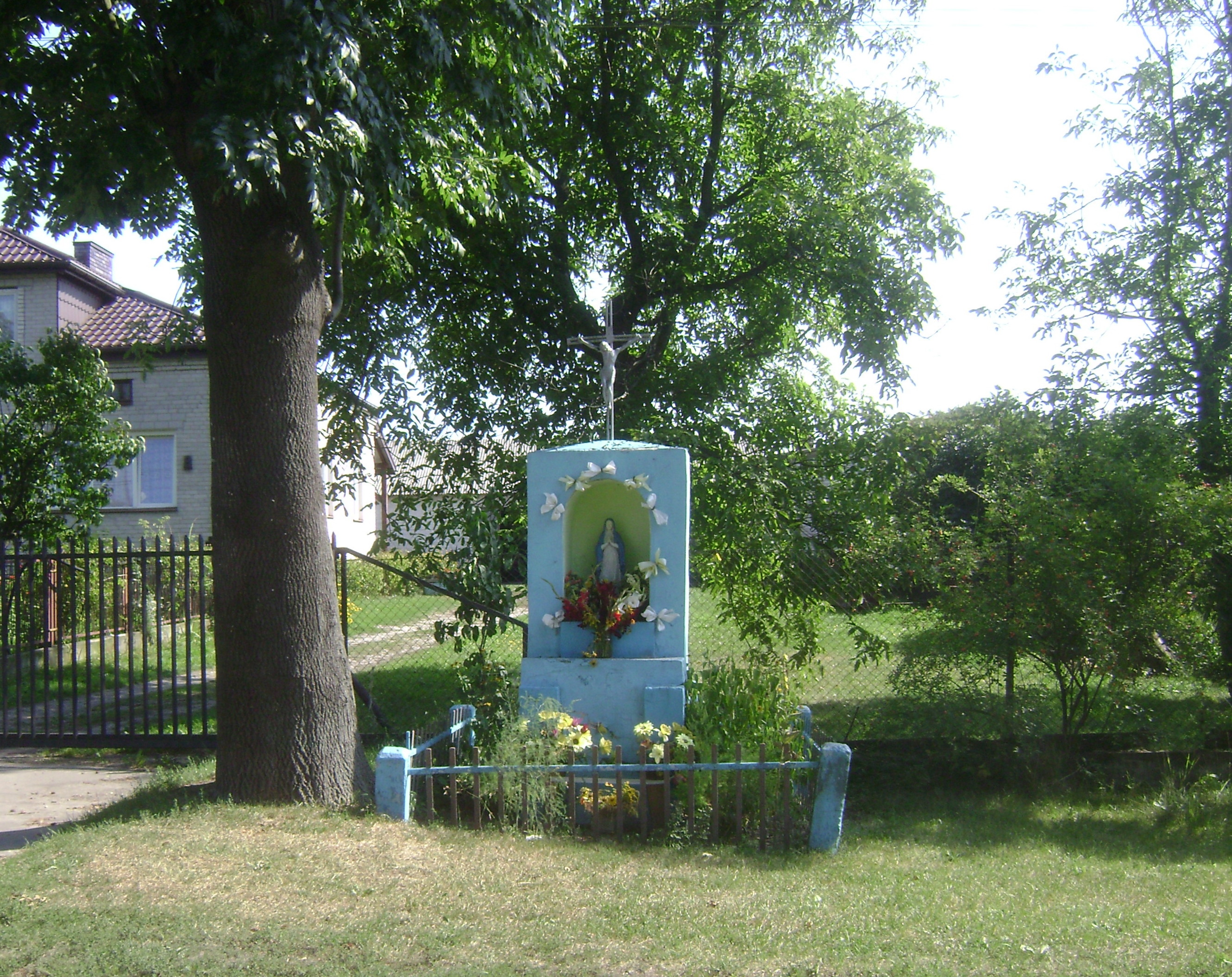
- Wayside shrine in Brzumin

- Location within Poland
- Coordinates: 51°56′24″N 21°15′35″E
- Country: Poland
- Voivodeship: Masovian
- County: Piaseczno
- Gmina: Góra Kalwaria

Brzumin [ˈbʐumin] is a village in the administrative district of Gmina Góra Kalwaria, within Piaseczno County, Masovian Voivodeship, in east-central Poland.
