= Wólka Dworska =

- Village
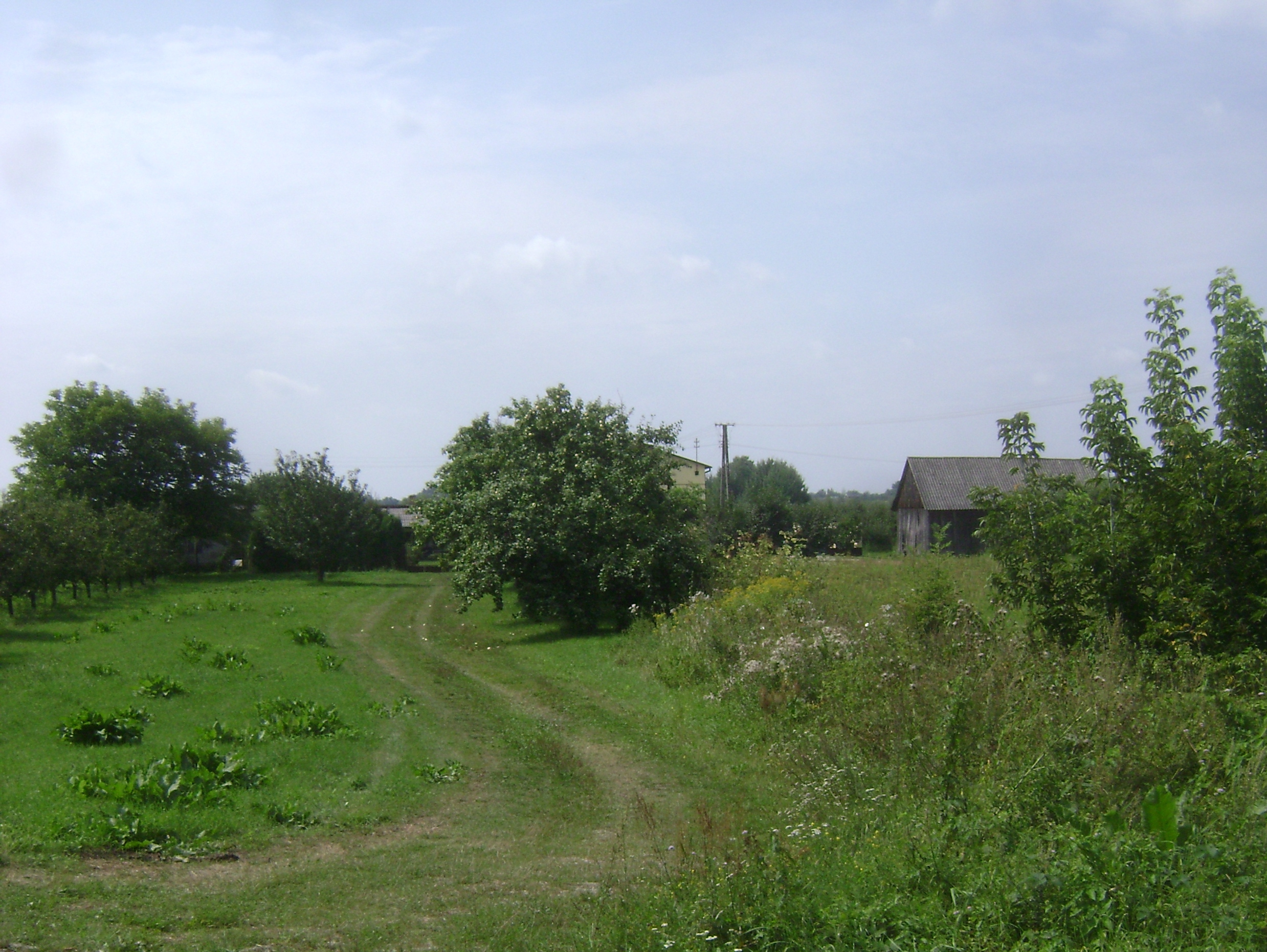

- Location within Poland
- Coordinates: 52°1′N 21°13′E
- Country: Poland
- Voivodeship: Masovian
- County: Piaseczno
- Gmina: Góra Kalwaria

Wólka Dworska [ˈvulka ˈdvɔrska] is a village in the administrative district of Gmina Góra Kalwaria, within Piaseczno County, Masovian Voivodeship, in east-central Poland.
