= Coniew =

- Village
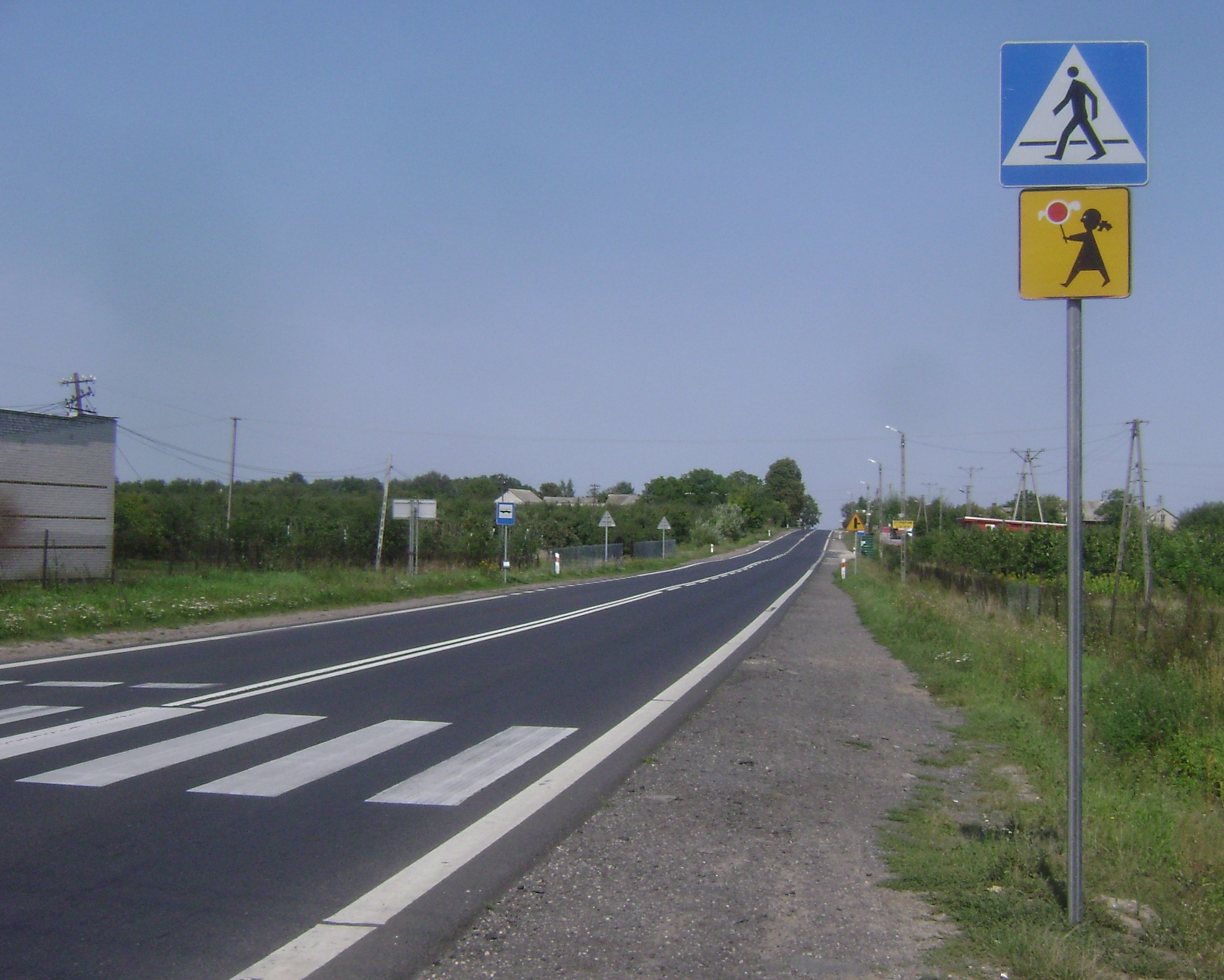
- National road 79 in Coniew

- Location within Poland
- Coordinates: 51°55′47″N 21°13′16″E
- Country: Poland
- Voivodeship: Masovian
- County: Piaseczno
- Gmina: Góra Kalwaria

Coniew [ˈt͡sɔɲɛf] is a village in the administrative district of Gmina Góra Kalwaria, within Piaseczno County, Masovian Voivodeship, in east-central Poland.
