= Borki, Piaseczno County =

Borki
- Village
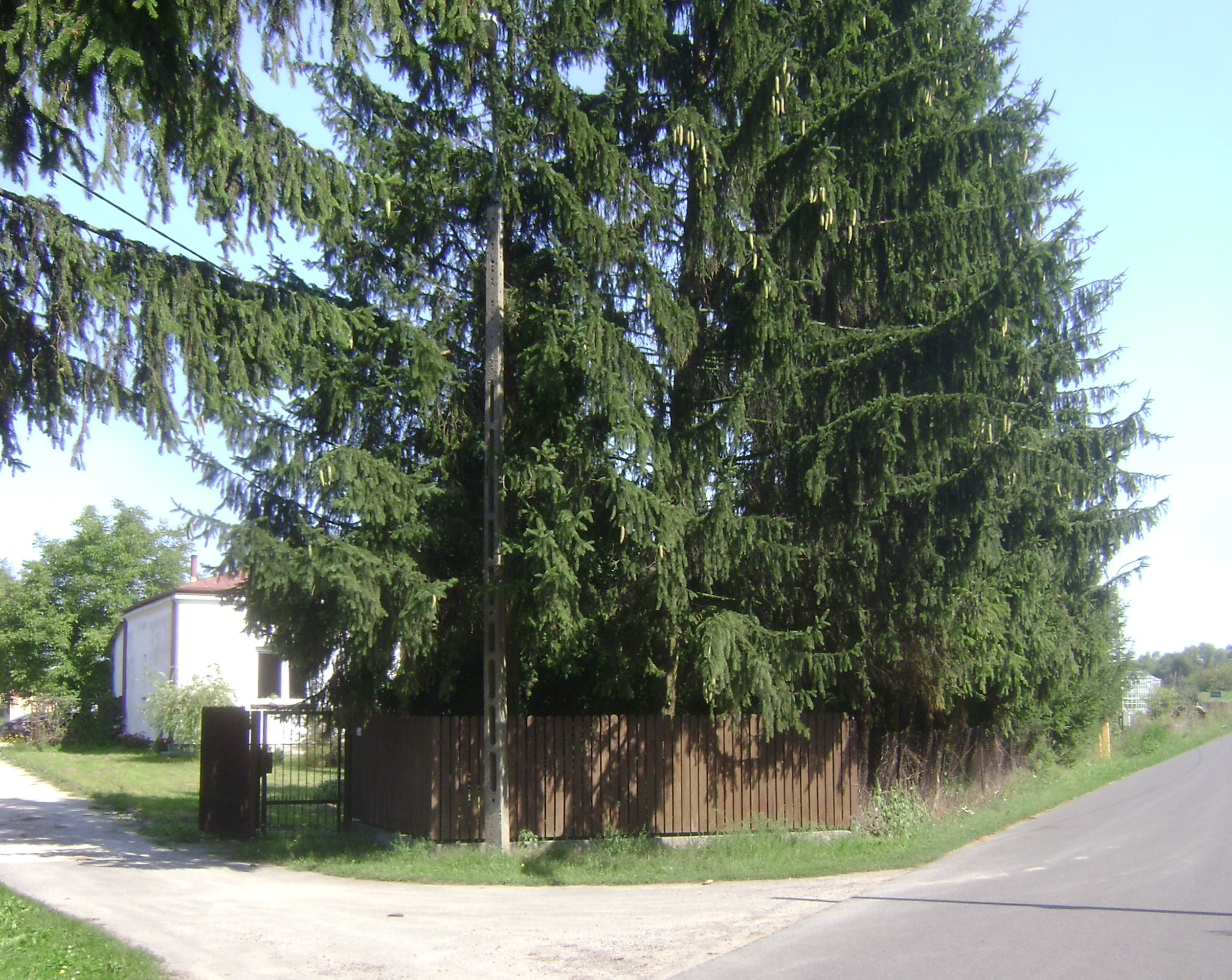

- Location within Poland
- Coordinates: 51°56′12″N 21°15′5″E
- Country: Poland
- Voivodeship: Masovian
- County: Piaseczno
- Gmina: Góra Kalwaria
- Population: 40

Borki [ˈbɔrki] is a village in the Administrative district of Gmina Góra Kalwaria, within Piaseczno County, Masovian Voivodeship, in east-central Poland.
