= Łubna, Masovian Voivodeship =

Łubna
- Village
- Location within Poland
- Coordinates: 52°2′3″N 21°7′40″E
- Country: Poland
- Voivodeship: Masovian
- County: Piaseczno
- Gmina: Góra Kalwaria

Łubna [ˈwubna] is a village in the administrative district of Gmina Góra Kalwaria, within Piaseczno County, Masovian Voivodeship, in east-central Poland.
