= Dębówka, Gmina Góra Kalwaria =

Dębówka
- Village
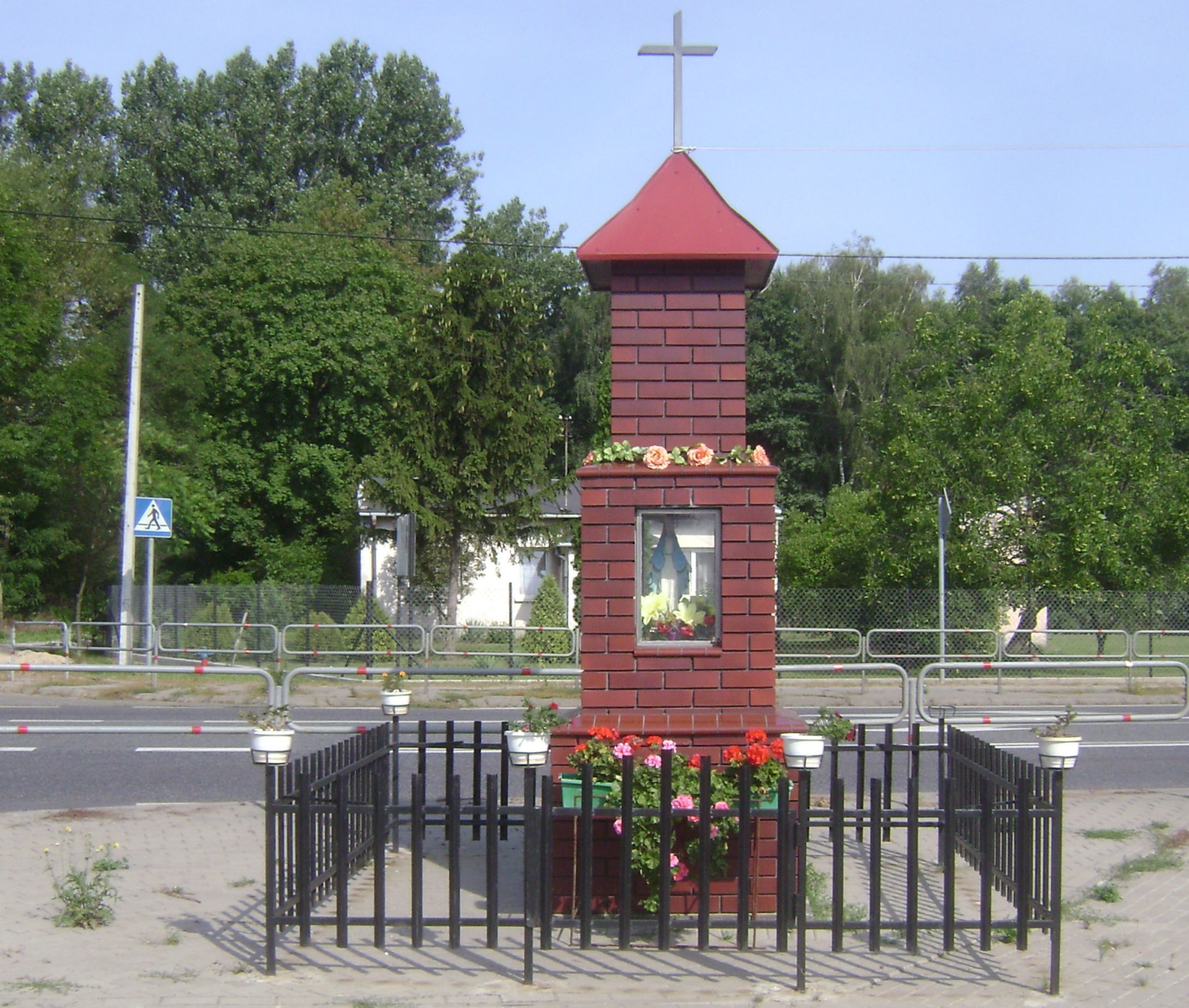

- Location within Poland
- Coordinates: 51°57′33″N 21°9′40″E
- Country: Poland
- Voivodeship: Masovian
- County: Piaseczno
- Gmina: Góra Kalwaria

Dębówka [dɛmˈbufka] is a village in the administrative district of Gmina Góra Kalwaria, within Piaseczno County, Masovian Voivodeship, in east-central Poland.
