= Królewski Las =

- Village
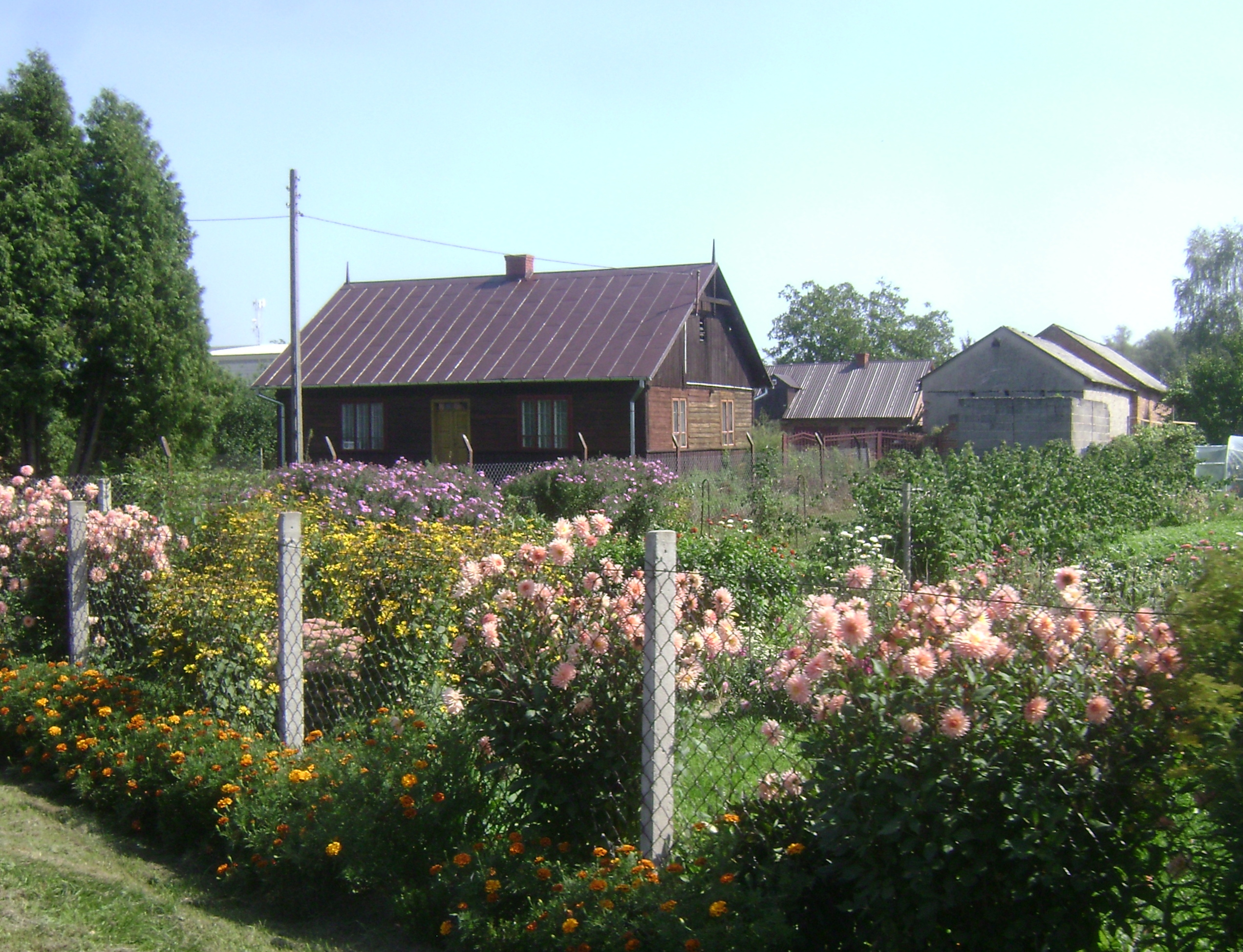

- Location within Poland
- Coordinates: 51°56′N 21°15′E
- Country: Poland
- Voivodeship: Masovian
- County: Piaseczno
- Gmina: Góra Kalwaria

Królewski Las (Polish pronunciation: [kruˈlɛfskʲi ˈlas]) is a village in the administrative district of Gmina Góra Kalwaria, within Piaseczno County, Masovian Voivodeship, in east-central Poland.
