= Wólka Załęska, Piaseczno County =

Wólka Załęska
- Village
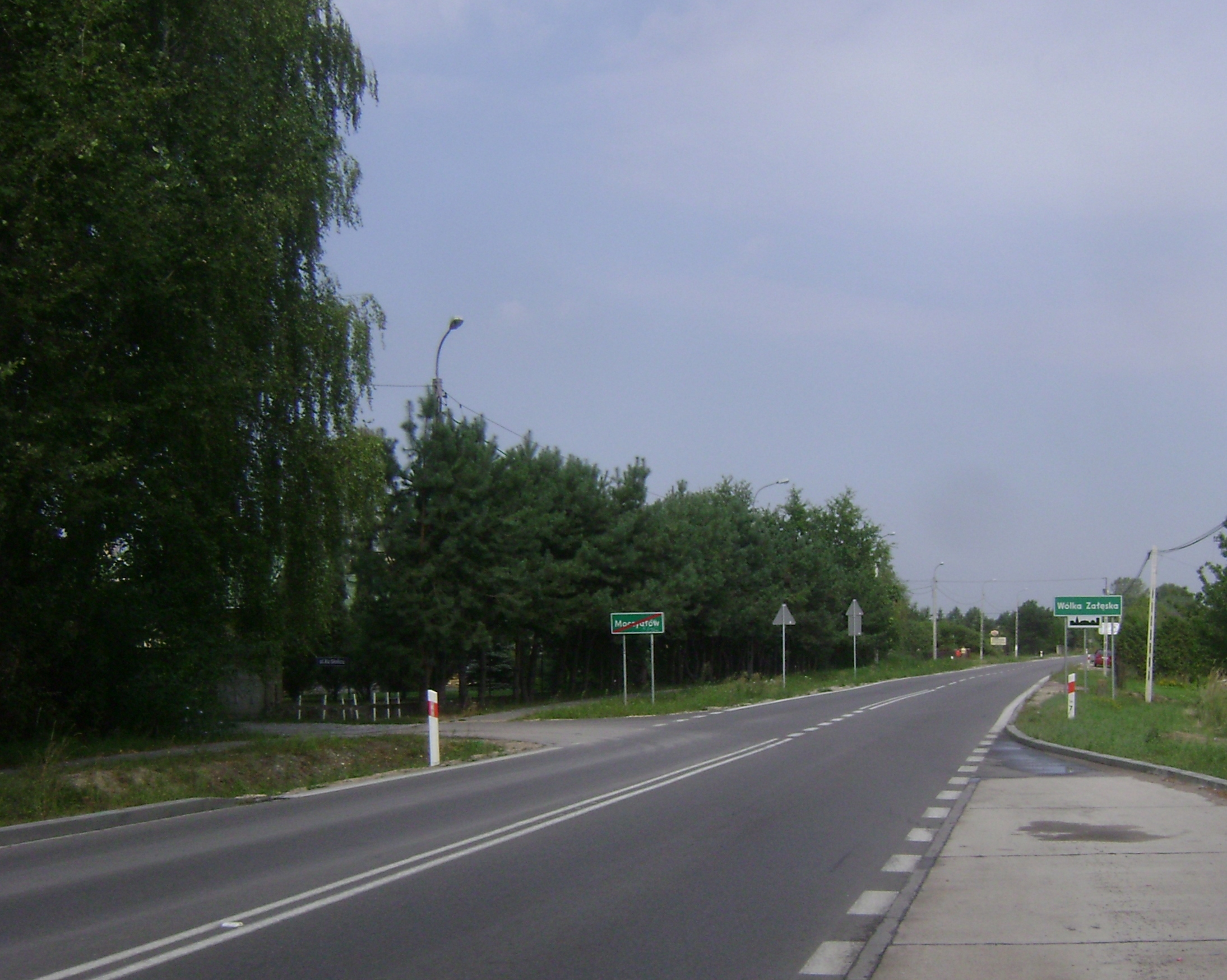

- Location within Poland
- Coordinates: 52°00′37″N 21°11′17″E
- Country: Poland
- Voivodeship: Masovian
- County: Piaseczno
- Gmina: Góra Kalwaria

Wólka Załęska [ˈvulka zaˈwɛ̃ska] is a village in the administrative district of Gmina Góra Kalwaria, within Piaseczno County, Masovian Voivodeship, in east-central Poland.
