= Ługówka =

- Village
- Location within Poland
- Coordinates: 51°59′28″N 21°8′28″E
- Country: Poland
- Voivodeship: Masovian
- County: Piaseczno
- Gmina: Góra Kalwaria
- Population: 40

Ługówka [wuˈɡufka] is a village in the administrative district of Gmina Góra Kalwaria, within Piaseczno County, Masovian Voivodeship, in east-central Poland.
