= Podłęcze, Masovian Voivodeship =

Podłęcze
- Village
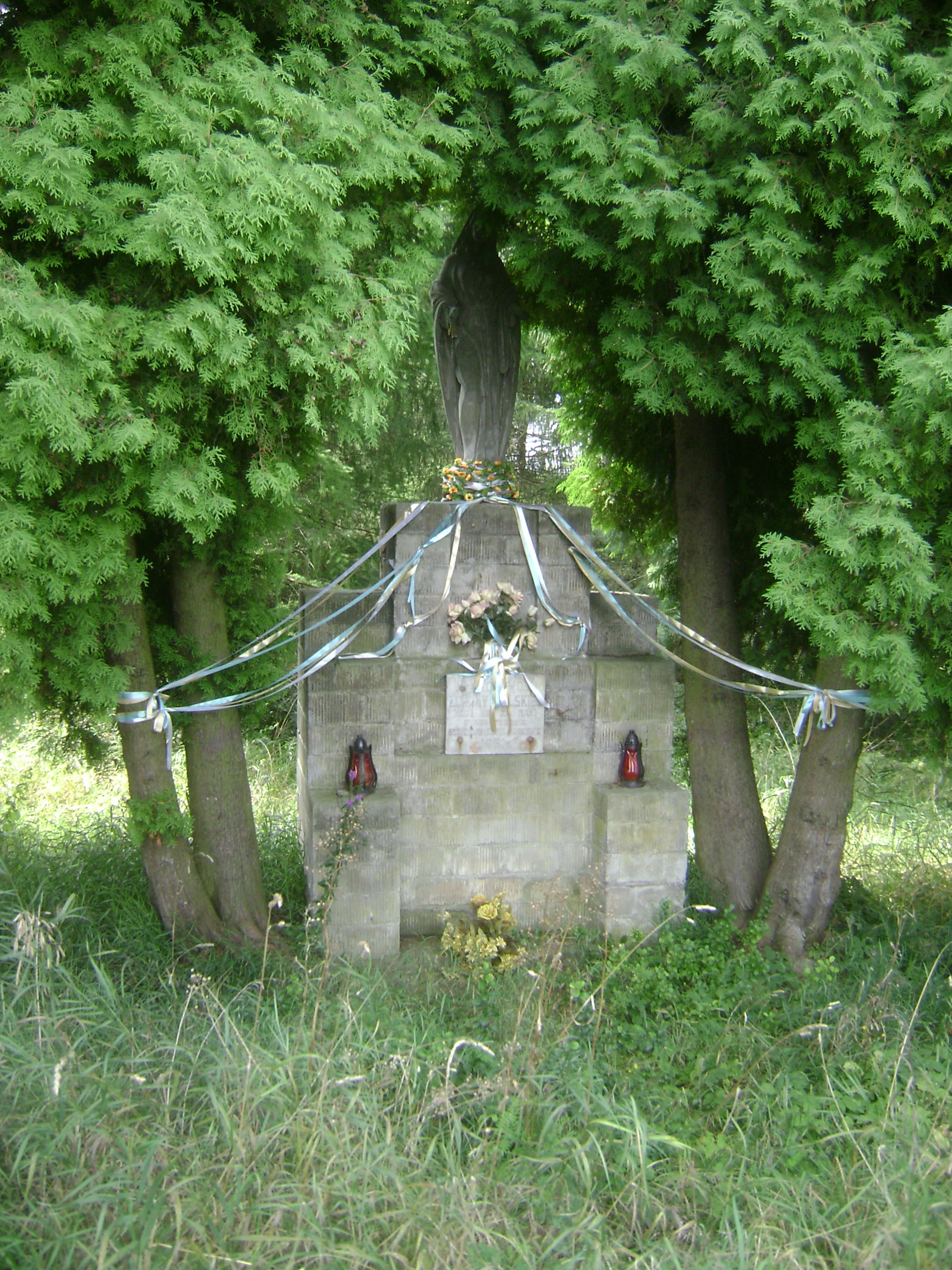
- Wayside shrine in Podłęcze

- Location within Poland
- Coordinates: 52°01′58″N 21°12′45″E
- Country: Poland
- Voivodeship: Masovian
- County: Piaseczno
- Gmina: Góra Kalwaria

Podłęcze [pɔdˈwɛnt͡ʂɛ] is a village in the administrative district of Gmina Góra Kalwaria, within Piaseczno County, Masovian Voivodeship, in east-central Poland.
