= Solec, Piaseczno County =

Solec
- Village
- Location within Poland
- Coordinates: 52°2′20″N 21°6′30″E
- Country: Poland
- Voivodeship: Masovian
- County: Piaseczno
- Gmina: Góra Kalwaria
- Highest elevation: 120 m (390 ft)
- Lowest elevation: 100 m (330 ft)
- Population (approx.): 500
- Website: http://www.naszsolec.pl

Solec [ˈsɔlɛt͡s] is a village in the administrative district of Gmina Góra Kalwaria, within Piaseczno County, Masovian Voivodeship, in east-central Poland.
