= Moczydłów =

- Village
- Location within Poland
- Coordinates: 52°0′N 21°11′E
- Country: Poland
- Voivodeship: Masovian
- County: Piaseczno
- Gmina: Góra Kalwaria

Moczydłów [mɔˈt͡ʂɨdwuf] is a village in the administrative district of Gmina Góra Kalwaria, within Piaseczno County, Masovian Voivodeship, in east-central Poland.
