= Potycz =

- Village
- Location within Poland
- Coordinates: 51°54′10″N 21°12′38″E
- Country: Poland
- Voivodeship: Masovian
- County: Piaseczno
- Gmina: Góra Kalwaria
- Population: 270

Potycz [ˈpɔtɨt͡ʂ] is a village in the administrative district of Gmina Góra Kalwaria, within Piaseczno County, Masovian Voivodeship, in east-central Poland.
