= Sierzchów, Masovian Voivodeship =

Sierzchów
- Village
- Location within Poland
- Coordinates: 51°58′58″N 21°7′7″E
- Country: Poland
- Voivodeship: Masovian
- County: Piaseczno
- Gmina: Góra Kalwaria

Sierzchów [ˈɕɛʂxuf] is a village in the administrative district of Gmina Góra Kalwaria, within Piaseczno County, Masovian Voivodeship, in east-central Poland.
