= Kępa Radwankowska =

- Village
- Location within Poland
- Coordinates: 51°57′8″N 21°15′58″E
- Country: Poland
- Voivodeship: Masovian
- County: Piaseczno
- Gmina: Góra Kalwaria
- Population: 10

Kępa Radwankowska [ˈkɛmpa radvanˈkɔfska] is a village in the administrative district of Gmina Góra Kalwaria, within Piaseczno County, Masovian Voivodeship, in east-central Poland.
