= Julianów, Gmina Góra Kalwaria =

Julianów
- Village
- Location within Poland
- Coordinates: 51°57′14″N 21°06′02″E
- Country: Poland
- Voivodeship: Masovian
- County: Piaseczno
- Gmina: Góra Kalwaria

Julianów [juˈljanuf] is a village in the administrative district of Gmina Góra Kalwaria, within Piaseczno County, Masovian Voivodeship, in east-central Poland.
