= Baniocha =

- Village
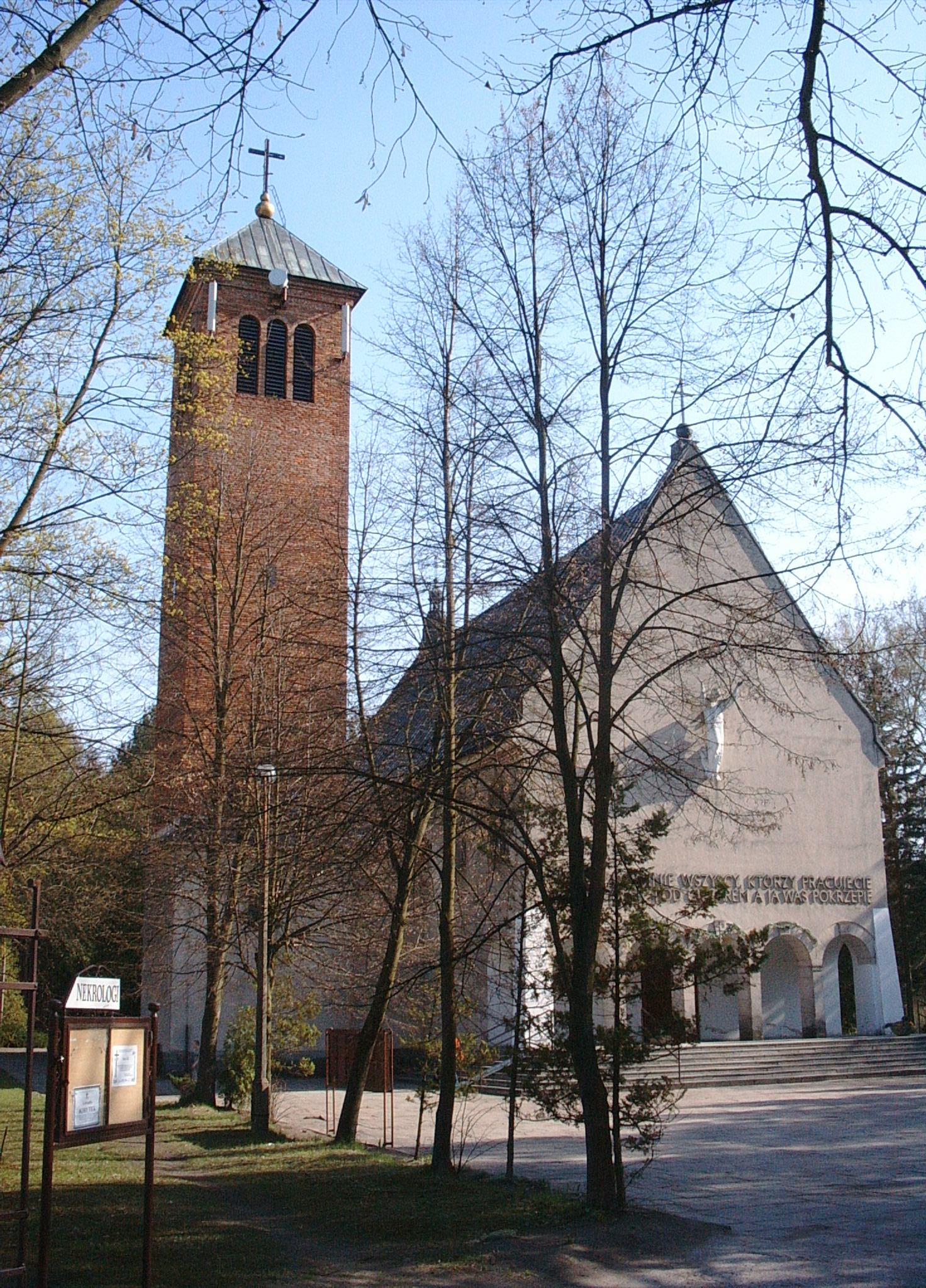
- Church of the Holy Virgin Mary, the Queen of Peace

- Location within Poland
- Coordinates: 52°1′14″N 21°7′49″E
- Country: Poland
- Voivodeship: Masovian
- County: Piaseczno
- Gmina: Góra Kalwaria

Population (approx.)
  - Total: 4,000

Baniocha [baˈɲɔxa] is a village in the administrative district of Gmina Góra Kalwaria, within Piaseczno County, Masovian Voivodeship, in east-central Poland.

Eight Polish citizens were murdered by Nazi Germany in the village during World War II.
