= Aleksandrów, Piaseczno County =

Aleksandrów
- Village
- Location within Poland
- Coordinates: 51°59′N 20°57′E
- Country: Poland
- Voivodeship: Masovian
- County: Piaseczno
- Gmina: Góra Kalwaria

Aleksandrów [alɛkˈsandruf] is a village in the administrative district of Gmina Góra Kalwaria, within Piaseczno County, Masovian Voivodeship, in east-central Poland.
