= Mikówiec =

- Village
- Location within Poland
- Coordinates: 51°59′43″N 21°10′35″E
- Country: Poland
- Voivodeship: Masovian
- County: Piaseczno
- Gmina: Góra Kalwaria

Mikówiec [miˈkuvjɛt͡s] is a village in the administrative district of Gmina Góra Kalwaria, within Piaseczno County, Masovian Voivodeship, in east-central Poland.
