= Karolina, Piaseczno County =

Karolina
- Village
- Location within Poland
- Coordinates: 51°58′N 21°11′E
- Country: Poland
- Voivodeship: Masovian
- County: Piaseczno
- Gmina: Góra Kalwaria

Karolina [karɔˈlina] is a village in the administrative district of Gmina Góra Kalwaria, within Piaseczno County, Masovian Voivodeship, in east-central Poland.
