= Sobików =

- Village
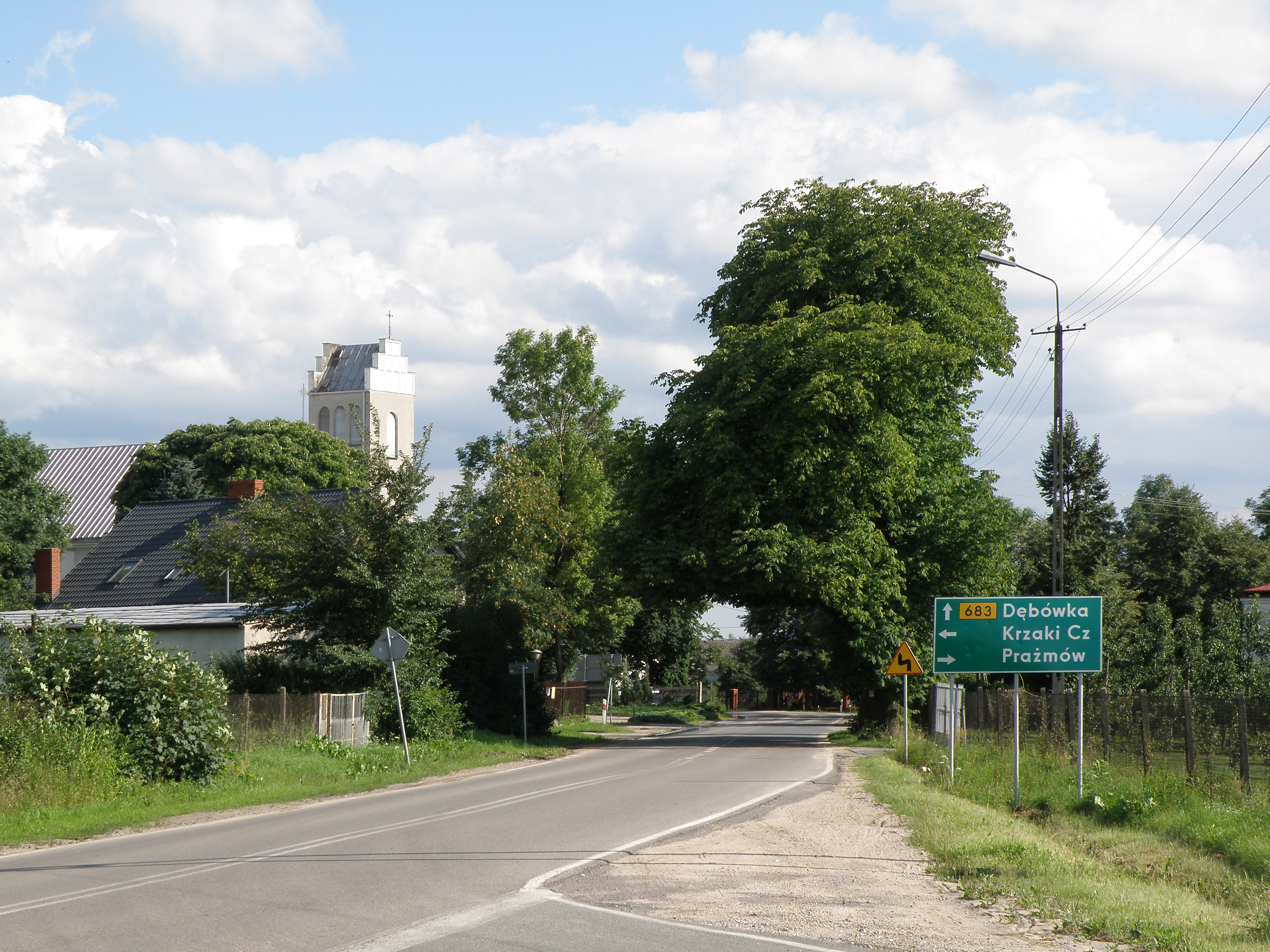

- Location within Poland
- Coordinates: 51°57′45″N 21°7′57″E
- Country: Poland
- Voivodeship: Masovian
- County: Piaseczno
- Gmina: Góra Kalwaria

Sobików [sɔˈbikuf] is a village in the administrative district of Gmina Góra Kalwaria, within Piaseczno County, Masovian Voivodeship, in east-central Poland.
