= Tomice, Masovian Voivodeship =

Tomice
- Village
- Location within Poland
- Coordinates: 52°00′29″N 21°09′28″E
- Country: Poland
- Voivodeship: Masovian
- County: Piaseczno
- Gmina: Góra Kalwaria
- Population: 280

Tomice [tɔˈmit͡sɛ] is a village in the administrative district of Gmina Góra Kalwaria, within Piaseczno County, Masovian Voivodeship, in east-central Poland.
