= Kąty, Piaseczno County =

Kąty
- Village
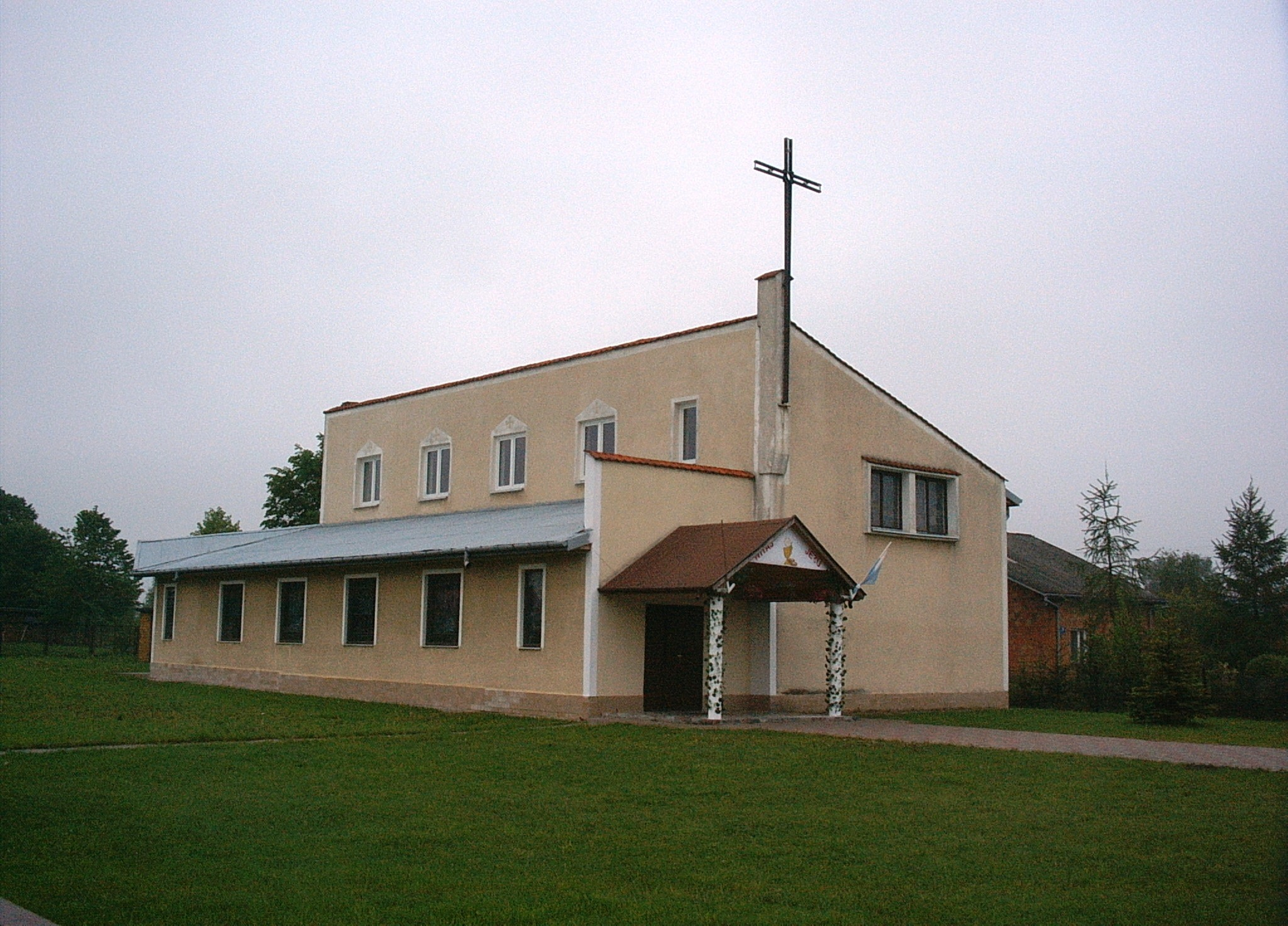

- Location within Poland
- Coordinates: 52°0′8″N 21°9′57″E
- Country: Poland
- Voivodeship: Masovian
- County: Piaseczno
- Gmina: Góra Kalwaria
- Time zone: UTC+1 (CET)
  - Summer (DST): UTC+2 (CEST)

Kąty [ˈkɔntɨ] is a village in the administrative district of Gmina Góra Kalwaria, within Piaseczno County, Masovian Voivodeship, in east-central Poland.

Four Polish citizens were murdered by Nazi Germany in the village during World War II.
