= Pęcław, Masovian Voivodeship =

Pęcław
- Village
- Location within Poland
- Coordinates: 51°55′50″N 21°11′45″E
- Country: Poland
- Voivodeship: Masovian
- County: Piaseczno
- Gmina: Góra Kalwaria

Pęcław [ˈpɛnt͡swaf] is a village in the administrative district of Gmina Góra Kalwaria, within Piaseczno County, Masovian Voivodeship, in east-central Poland.
