= Ostrówik =

- Village
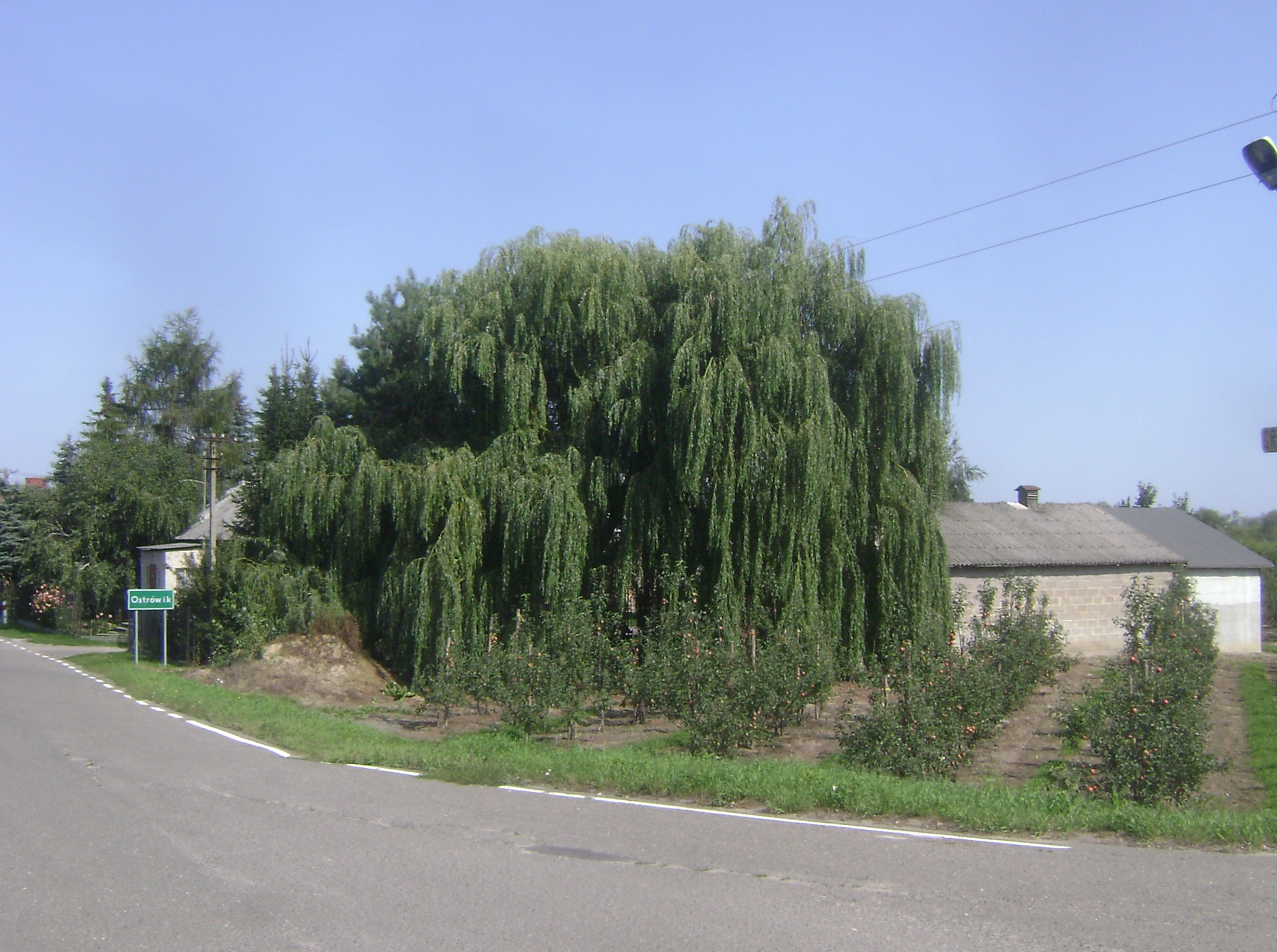
- Voivodeship road in Ostrówik

- Location within Poland
- Coordinates: 51°56′58″N 21°15′27″E
- Country: Poland
- Voivodeship: Masovian
- County: Piaseczno
- Gmina: Góra Kalwaria

Ostrówik [ɔsˈtruvik] is a village in the administrative district of Gmina Góra Kalwaria, within Piaseczno County, Masovian Voivodeship, in east-central Poland.
